= List of The Great British Bake Off contestants =

The following people participated in The Great British Bake Off, which premiered on BBC Two in 2010, then moved to BBC One in 2014, and then moved to Channel 4 in 2017. The Star Baker award was introduced in the second series (2011). To this date, runner-up Richard Burr in the fifth series and winner Jasmine Mitchell in the sixteenth series have held the highest record of five Star Baker wins respectively. David Atherton in the tenth series had never earned a Star Baker award but was eventually crowned the winner.

== BBC series (2010–2016) ==
All information is accurate as of the time the series was filmed.

List of The Great British Bake Off bakers (BBC)
Baker	Age	Occupation	Hometown	Star Baker	Week when Star Baker was earned	Finish	Series
Lea Harris	51	Retired	Midlothian, Scotland	–	–	9th	Series 1
Mark Whithers	48	Bus Driver	South Wales	–	–	9th	Series 1
Annetha Mills	30	Midwife	Essex	–	–	7th	Series 1
Louise Brimelow	44	Police Officer	Manchester	–	–	7th	Series 1
Jonathan Shepherd	25	Research Analyst	St Albans	–	–	6th	Series 1
David Chambers	31	Entrepreneur	Milton Keynes	–	–	5th	Series 1
Jasminder "Jas" Randhawa	45	Assistant Credit Control Manager	Birmingham	–	–	4th	Series 1
Miranda Gore Browne	37	Food buyer for Marks & Spencer	Midhurst, West Sussex	–	–	3rd	Series 1
Ruth Clemens	31	Retail manager/Housewife	Poynton, Cheshire	–	–	Runner-up	Series 1
Edward "Edd" Kimber	24	Debt collector for Yorkshire Bank	Bradford	–	–	Winner	Series 1
Keith Batsford	31	Househusband	Arlesey, Bedfordshire	0	–	12th	Series 2
Simon Blackwell	31	Rugby Coach	Norfolk	0	–	11th	Series 2
Ian Vallance	40	Fundraiser for English Heritage	Dunstable, Bedfordshire	0	–	9th	Series 2
Urvashi Roe	40	Head of Marketing	Enfield, London	0	–	9th	Series 2
Ben Frazer	31	Graphic Designer	Northampton	0	–	8th	Series 2
Jason White	19	Civil Engineering Student	Croydon	2	Week 2 (Tarts), Week 4 (Biscuits)	6th	Series 2
Robert Billington	25	Photographer	London	0	–	6th	Series 2
Yasmin Limbert	43	Childminder	West Kirby, The Wirral	1	Week 3 (Bread)	5th	Series 2
Janet Basu	63	Teacher of Modern Languages	Formby, Liverpool	1	Week 5 (Pies)	4th	Series 2
Holly Bell	31	Advertising executive	Leicester	2	Week 1 (Cakes), Week 4 (Biscuits)	Runner-up	Series 2
Mary-Anne Boermans	45	Housewife	Kidderminster, Worcestershire	0	–	Runner-up	Series 2
Joanne "Jo" Wheatley	41	Housewife	Ongar, Essex	1	Week 6 (Desserts)	Winner	Series 2
Natasha Stringer	36	Midwife	Tamworth, Staffordshire	0	–	12th	Series 3
Peter Maloney	43	Sales manager	Windsor, Berkshire	0	–	11th	Series 3
Victoria Chester	50	CEO of the charity Plantlife	Somerset	1	Week 1 (Cakes)	10th	Series 3
Stuart Marston-Smith	26	PE teacher	Lichfield, Staffordshire	0	–	9th	Series 3
Manisha Parmar	27	Nursery nurse	Leicester	0	–	8th	Series 3
Ryan Chong	38	Photographer	Bristol	1	Week 5 (Pies)	6th	Series 3
Sarah-Jane Willis	28	Vicar's wife	Bewbush, West Sussex	0	–	6th	Series 3
Cathryn Dresser	27	Shop assistant	Pease Pottage, West Sussex	0	–	5th	Series 3
Danny Bryden	45	Intensive care consultant	Sheffield	1	Week 7 (Sweet Dough)	4th	Series 3
Brendan Lynch	63	Recruitment consultant	Sutton Coldfield	2	Week 4 (Desserts), Week 6 (Puddings)	Runner-up	Series 3
James Morton	21	Medical student	Hillswick, Shetland Islands	3	Week 3 (Tarts), Week 8 (Biscuits), Week 9 (Patisserie)	Runner-up	Series 3
John Whaite	22	Law student	Wigan	1	Week 2 (Bread)	Winner	Series 3
Toby Waterworth	30	Web Programmer	Reading, Berkshire	0	–	13th	Series 4
Lucy Bellamy	38	Horticulturist	Grimsby, Lincolnshire	0	–	12th	Series 4
Deborah Manger	51	Dentist	Peterborough	0	–	10th	Series 4
Mark Onley	37	Carpenter and Kitchen Fitter	Milton Keynes	0	–	10th	Series 4
Ali Imdad	25	Charity worker	Saltley, Birmingham	0	–	9th	Series 4
Robert Smart	54	Space Satellite Designer	Melbourn, Cambridgeshire	1	Week 1 (Cakes)	8th	Series 4
Howard Middleton	51	Council Worker	Sheffield	0	–	7th	Series 4
Glenn Cosby	37	English Teacher	Teignmouth, Devon	0	–	6th	Series 4
Christine Wallace	66	Director of an engraving company	Didcot, Oxfordshire	2	Week 3 (Desserts), Week 5 (Biscuits & Traybakes)	5th	Series 4
Beca Lyne-Pirkis	31	Military Wives' Choir Singer	Aldershot, Hampshire	0	–	4th	Series 4
Kimberley Wilson	30	Psychologist	London	2	Week 4 (Pies & Tarts), Week 9 (French Week)	Runner-up	Series 4
Ruby Tandoh	20	History of Art and Philosophy Student	Southend, Essex	3	Week 2 (Bread), Week 6 (Sweet Dough), Week 8 (Alternative Ingredients)	Runner-up	Series 4
Frances Quinn	31	Children's Clothes Designer	Market Harborough, Leicestershire	1	Week 7 (Pastry)	Winner	Series 4
Claire Goodwin	31	Speech Therapist	Ashton upon Mersey, Trafford	0	–	12th	Series 5
Enwezor Nzegwu	39	Business Consultant	Portsmouth, Hampshire	0	–	11th	Series 5
Jordan Cox	32	IT Manager	Sneinton, Nottingham	0	–	10th	Series 5
Iain Watters	31	Construction Engineer	London/Belfast	0	–	9th	Series 5
Diana Beard	69	Women's Institute (WI) Judge	Alkington, Shropshire	0	–	8th (Note: Diana Beard withdrew from the competition after episode 4 following her illness. Before episode 5 was filmed, she suffered a head injury.)	Series 5
Norman Calder	66	Retired Naval Officer	Portknockie, Moray	0	–	7th	Series 5
Kate Henry	41	Furniture Restorer	Brighton, East Sussex	1	Week 5 (Pies & Tarts)	6th	Series 5
Martha Collison	17	Student	Ascot, Berkshire	0	–	5th	Series 5
Chetna Makan	35	Fashion Designer	Broadstairs, Kent	1	Week 6 (European Cakes)	4th	Series 5
Luis Troyano	42	Graphic Designer	Poynton, Cheshire	1	Week 3 (Bread)	Runner-up	Series 5
Richard Burr	38	Builder	Mill Hill, London	5	Week 2 (Biscuits), Week 4 (Desserts), Week 7 (Pastry), Week 8 (Advanced Dough), Week 9 (Patisserie)	Runner-up	Series 5
Nancy Birtwhistle	60	Retired Practice Manager	Barton-upon-Humber, Lincolnshire	1	Week 1 (Cakes)	Winner	Series 5
Stu Henshall	35	Professional musician	Guildford, Surrey	0	–	12th	Series 6
Marie Campbell	66	Retired	Auchterarder, Perthshire	1	Week 1 (Cake)	11th	Series 6
Dorret Conway	53	Accountant	Penwortham, Lancashire	0	–	10th	Series 6
Sandy Docherty	49	Child welfare officer	Yeadon, West Yorkshire	0	–	9th	Series 6
Ugnė Bubnaityte	32	PA and administrator	Woodford, London / Vilkaviškis, Lithuania	0	–	8th	Series 6
Alvin Magallanes	37	Nurse	Bracknell, Berkshire	0	–	7th	Series 6
Mat Riley	37	Fire fighter	London	1	Week 6 (Pastry)	6th	Series 6
Paul Jagger	49	Prison governor	Swansea, Wales	0	–	5th	Series 6
Flora Shedden	19	Art gallery assistant	Dunkeld, Perth and Kinross	0	–	4th	Series 6
Ian Cumming	41	Travel photographer	Great Wilbraham, Cambridgeshire	3	Week 2 (Biscuits), Week 3 (Bread), Week 4 (Desserts)	Runner-up	Series 6
Tamal Ray	29	Trainee anaesthetist	Manchester	1	Week 7 (Victorian)	Runner-up	Series 6
Nadiya Hussain	30	Full-time mother	Leeds / Luton	3	Week 5 (Alternative Ingredients), Week 8 (Patisserie), Week 9 (Chocolate)	Winner	Series 6
Lee Banfield	67	Pastor	Bolton	0	–	12th	Series 7
Louise Williams	46	Hairdresser	Cardiff	0	–	11th	Series 7
Michael Georgiou	20	Student	Durham	0	–	10th	Series 7
Kate Barmby	37	Nurse	Brooke, Norfolk	0	–	9th	Series 7
Valerie "Val" Stones	66	Semi-retired, Substitute teacher	Yeovil	0	–	8th	Series 7
Rav Bansal	28	Student support	Erith	0	–	7th	Series 7
Tom Gilliford	26	Project engagement manager	Rochdale	2	Week 3 (Bread), Week 6 (Botanical)	6th	Series 7
Benjamina Ebuehi	23	Teaching assistant	South London	1	Week 4 (Batter)	5th	Series 7
Selasi Gbormittah	30	Client service associate	London	0	–	4th	Series 7
Andrew Smyth	25	Aerospace engineer	Derby / Holywood, County Down	2	Week 7 (Desserts), Week 9 (Patisserie)	Runner-up	Series 7
Jane Beedle	61	Garden designer	Beckenham	1	Week 1 (Cake)	Runner-up	Series 7
Candice Brown	31	PE teacher	Barton-Le-Clay, Bedfordshire	3	Week 2 (Biscuits), Week 5 (Pastry), Week 8 (Tudor)	Winner	Series 7

== Channel 4 series (2017–present) ==
All information is accurate as of the time the series was filmed.

List of The Great British Bake Off bakers (Channel 4)
Baker	Age	Occupation	Hometown	Star Baker	Week when Star Baker was earned	Finish	Series
Peter Abatan	52	IT programme manager	Southend, Essex	0	–	12th	Series 8
Chris Geiger	50	Software developer	Bristol	0	–	11th	Series 8
Flo Atkins	71	Retired	Merseyside	0	–	10th	Series 8
Tom Hetherington	29	Architect	Edinburgh	0	–	9th	Series 8
James Hillery	46	Banker	Brentwood, Essex	0	–	8th	Series 8
Julia Chernogorova	21	Aviation Broker	Crawley, West Sussex	1	Week 3 (Bread)	7th	Series 8
Chuen-Yan "Yan" Tsou	46	Laboratory research scientist	North London	0	–	6th	Series 8
Liam Charles	19	Student	North London	1	Week 6 (Pastry)	5th	Series 8
Stacey Hart	42	Former school teacher	Radlett, Hertfordshire	1	Week 8 (Forgotten Bakes)	4th	Series 8
Kate Lyon	29	Health and safety inspector	Merseyside	1	Week 4 (Caramel)	Runner-up	Series 8
Steven Carter-Bailey	34	Marketer	Watford, Hertfordshire	3	Week 1 (Cake), Week 2 (Biscuits), Week 7 (Italian)	Runner-up	Series 8
Sophie Faldo	33	Former army officer and trainee stuntwoman	West Molesey, Surrey	2	Week 5 (Puddings), Week 9 (Patisserie)	Winner	Series 8
Imelda McCarron	33	Countryside recreation officer	County Tyrone	0	–	12th	Series 9
Luke Thompson	30	Civil servant/house and techno DJ	Sheffield	0	–	11th	Series 9
Antony Amourdoux	30	Banker	London	0	–	10th	Series 9
Karen Wright	60	In-store sampling assistant	Wakefield	0	–	8th	Series 9
Terry Hartill	56	Retired air steward	West Midlands	0	–	8th	Series 9
Dan Beasley-Harling	36	Stay at home parent	London	1	Week 4 (Desserts)	7th	Series 9
Jon Jenkins	47	Blood courier	Newport	0	–	6th	Series 9
Manon Lagrève	26	Software project manager	London	1	Week 1 (Biscuits)	5th	Series 9
Briony May Williams	33	Stay at home parent	Bristol	1	Week 6 (Pastry)	4th	Series 9
Kim-Joy Hewlett	27	Mental health specialist	Leeds	2	Week 5 (Spice), Week 7 (Vegan)	Runner-up	Series 9
Ruby Bhogal	29	Project manager	London	2	Week 8 (Danish), Week 9 (Patisserie)	Runner-up	Series 9
Rahul Mandal	30	Research scientist	Rotherham	2	Week 2 (Cakes), Week 3 (Bread)	Winner	Series 9
Dan Chambers	32	Support worker	Rotherham	0	–	13th	Series 10
Jamie Finn	20	Part-time waiter	Surrey	0	–	12th	Series 10
Amelia Le Bruin	24	Fashion designer	Halifax	0	–	11th	Series 10
Phil Thorne	56	HGV driver	Rainham	0	–	10th	Series 10
Helena Garcia	40	Online project manager	Leeds	0	–	8th	Series 10
Michelle Evans-Fecci	35	Print shop administrator	Tenby, Wales	1	Week 1 (Cake)	8th	Series 10
Priya O'Shea	34	Marketing consultant	Leicester	0	–	7th	Series 10
Michael Chakraverty	26	Theatre manager/fitness instructor	Stratford-upon-Avon	1	Week 3 (Bread)	6th	Series 10
Henry Bird	20	Student	Durham	1	Week 7 (Festivals)	5th	Series 10
Rosie Brandreth-Poynter	28	Veterinary surgeon	Somerset	0	–	4th	Series 10
Alice Fevronia	28	Geography teacher	Essex	2	Week 2 (Biscuits), Week 9 (Patisserie)	Runner-up	Series 10
Steph Blackwell	28	Shop assistant	Chester	4	Week 4 (Dairy), Week 5 (The Roaring Twenties), Week 6 (Desserts), Week 8 (Pastry)	Runner-up	Series 10
David Atherton	36	International health adviser	Whitby	0	–	Winner	Series 10
Loriea Campbell-Clarey	27	Diagnostic radiographer	Durham	0	–	12th	Series 11
Makbul "Mak" Patel	51	Accountant	Manchester	0	–	11th	Series 11
Rowan Williams	55	Music teacher	Pershore, Worcestershire	0	–	10th	Series 11
Sura Mitib	31	Hospital pharmacy dispenser	London	0	–	9th	Series 11
Linda Rayfield	61	Retirement living team leader	Bexhill-on-Sea, East Sussex	0	–	8th	Series 11
Mark Lutton	32	Project manager	Portadown, Northern Ireland	1	Week 4 (Chocolate)	7th	Series 11
Lottie Bedlow	31	Pantomime producer	West Sussex	1	Week 6 (Japanese)	6th	Series 11
Marc Elliott	51	Bronze resin sculptor	St Eval, Cornwall	1	Week 3 (Bread)	5th	Series 11
Hermine Dossou	39	Accountant	London	2	Week 7 (The '80s), Week 8 (Desserts)	4th	Series 11
Dave Friday	30	Armoured security guard	Waterlooville, Hampshire	1	Week 2 (Biscuits)	Runner-up	Series 11
Laura Adlington	31	Digital manager	Gravesend, Kent	1	Week 5 (Pastry)	Runner-up	Series 11
Peter Sawkins	20	Accounting & finance student	Edinburgh	2	Week 1 (Cake), Week 9 (Patisserie)	Winner	Series 11
Tom Fletcher	28	Software developer	Maidstone, Kent	0	–	12th	Series 12
Jairzinho Parris	51	Head of Finance	London	0	–	11th	Series 12
Rochica Copeland	27	Junior HR business partner	Birmingham	0	–	10th	Series 12
Maggie Richardson	70	Retired nurse and midwife	Poole, Dorset	0	–	9th	Series 12
Freya Cox	19	Student	Scarborough, North Yorkshire	0	–	8th	Series 12
Amanda Georgiou	56	Metropolitan Police detective	London	0	–	7th	Series 12
George Aristidou	34	Shared lives coordinator	London	0	–	6th	Series 12
Lizzie Acker	28	Car production operative	Liverpool	0	–	5th	Series 12
Jürgen Krauss	56	Physicist	Brighton, East Sussex	3	Week 1 (Cake), Week 2 (Biscuits), Week 7 (Caramel)	4th	Series 12
Chigs Parmar	40	Sales manager	Leicester	2	Week 4 (Desserts), Week 8 (Free-from)	Runner-up	Series 12
Crystelle Pereira	26	Client relationship manager	London	2	Week 6 (Pastry), Week 9 (Patisserie)	Runner-up	Series 12
Giuseppe Dell'Anno	45	Chief engineer	Bristol	2	Week 3 (Bread), Week 5 (German)	Winner	Series 12
Will Hawkins	45	Former charity director	London	0	–	12th	Series 13
Maisam Algirgeet	18	Student and sales assistant	Greater Manchester	0	–	11th	Series 13
James Dewar	25	Nuclear scientist	Cumbria	0	–	9th	Series 13
Rebecca "Rebs" Lightbody	23	Masters student	County Antrim	0	–	9th	Series 13
Carole Edwards	59	Supermarket cashier	Dorset	0	–	8th	Series 13
Dawn Hollyoak	60	IT manager	Bedfordshire	0	–	7th	Series 13
Kevin Flynn	33	Music teacher	Lanarkshire	0	–	6th	Series 13
Marie-Therese "Maxy" Maligisa	29	Architectural assistant	London	2	Week 2 (Biscuits), Week 4 (Mexico)	5th	Series 13
Janusz Domagala	34	Personal assistant to head teacher	East Sussex	2	Week 1 (Cake), Week 3 (Bread)	4th	Series 13
Abdul Rehman Sharif	29	Electronics engineer	London	1	Week 9 (Patisserie)	Runner-up	Series 13
Nelsandro "Sandro" Farmhouse	30	Nanny	London	1	Week 5 (Desserts)	Runner-up	Series 13
Syabira Yusoff	32	Cardiovascular research associate	London	3	Week 6 (Halloween), Week 7 (Custard), Week 8 (Pastry)	Winner	Series 13
Amos Lilley	43	Deli and grocery manager	London	0	–	12th	Series 14
Keith Barron	60	Chartered accountant	Hampshire	0	–	11th	Series 14
Abbi Lawson	27	Delivery driver	Cumbria	0	–	10th	Series 14
Nicky Laceby	52	Pet-therapy volunteer	West Midlands	0	–	8th	Series 14
Rowan Claughton	21	English literature student	West Yorkshire	0	–	8th	Series 14
Dana Conway	25	Database administrator	Essex	0	–	7th	Series 14
Saku Chandrasekara	50	Intelligence analyst	Herefordshire	0	–	6th	Series 14
Cristy Sharp	33	Personal assistant	London	1	Week 5 (Pastry)	5th	Series 14
Tasha Stones	27	Participation officer	Bristol	2	Week 2 (Biscuits), Week 3 (Bread)	4th	Series 14
Dan Hunter	42	Resource planner	Cheshire	2	Week 1 (Cake), Week 7 (Desserts)	Runner-up	Series 14
Josh Smalley	27	Research associate	Leicestershire	2	Week 6 (Botanical), Week 9 (Patisserie)	Runner-up	Series 14
Matty Edgell	28	Teacher	Cambridgeshire	2	Week 4 (Chocolate), Week 8 (Party)	Winner	Series 14
Jeff Thomas	67	Retired university lecturer	West Yorkshire (originally from The Bronx)	0	–	12th (Note: Jeff left the show during the technical challenge in episode 2 after feeling unwell.)	Series 15
Hazel Vaughan	71	Retired nail technician	Kent	0	–	11th	Series 15
John Mincher	37	Directorate support manager	Willenhall	1	Week 1 (Cake)	10th	Series 15
Mike Wilkins	29	Farm manager	Wiltshire	0	–	9th	Series 15
Andy Ryan	44	Car mechanic	Essex	0	–	8th	Series 15
Nelly Ghaffar	44	Palliative care assistant	Dorset (originally from Slovakia)	0	–	7th	Series 15
Sumayah Kazi	18	Gap Year student	Lancashire	2	Week 2 (Biscuits), Week 6 (Autumn)	6th	Series 15
Illiyin Morrison	31	Birth trauma specialist midwife	Norfolk	0	–	5th	Series 15
Gill Howard	53	Senior category manager	Lancashire	1	Week 5 (Pastry)	4th	Series 15
Christiaan de Vries	33	Menswear designer	London (originally from the Netherlands)	1	Week 9 (Patisserie)	Runner-up	Series 15
Dylan Bachelet	20	Retail assistant	Buckinghamshire	2	Week 3 (Bread), Week 7 (Desserts)	Runner-up	Series 15
Georgie Grasso	34	Paediatric nurse	Carmarthenshire	2	Week 4 (Caramel), Week 8 (The '70s)	Winner	Series 15
Hassan Islam	30	Analytical research & development scientist	Rotherham	0	–	12th	Series 16
Leighton Morgan	59	Software delivery manager	Surrey	0	–	11th	Series 16
Carol 'Pui Man' Li	51	Bridal designer	Essex (originally from Hong Kong)	0	–	10th	Series 16
Jessika Trassel	32	Service designer	London	0	–	9th	Series 16
Nadia Mercuri	41	Hairdresser	Liverpool	0	–	8th	Series 16
Nataliia Richardson	32	Office assistant	East Yorkshire (originally from Ukraine)	1	Week 1 (Cake)	7th	Series 16
Lesley Holloway	59	Hairdresser	Kent	0	–	6th	Series 16
Iain Ross	29	Software engineer	Belfast, Northern Ireland	0	–	5th	Series 16
Toby Littlewood	29	Business development executive	Warwickshire	1	Week 7 (Meringue)	4th	Series 16
Aaron Mountford-Myles	38	Senior systems architect	Stoke-on-Trent	1	Week 5 (Chocolate)	Runner-up	Series 16
Tom Arden	31	Creative entrepreneur	London	1	Week 2 (Biscuits)	Runner-up	Series 16
Jasmine Mitchell	23	Medical student	London	5	Week 3 (Bread), Week 4 (Back to School), Week 6 (Pastry), Week 8 (Desserts), Week 9 (Pâtisserie)	Winner	Series 16

== See also ==
- List of The Great British Bake Off finalists
- List of The Great British Bake Off Star Bakers
