= The Great British Bake Off series 12 =

Twelfth series of The Great British Bake Off

The Great British Bake Off
- Series 12
- Presented by: Noel Fielding; Matt Lucas
- Judges: Paul Hollywood; Prue Leith
- No. of contestants: 12
- Winner: Giuseppe Dell'Anno
- Runners-up: Chigs Parmar; Crystelle Pereira
- Location: Down Hall, near Bishop's Stortford
- No. of max. bakes: 30
- No. of episodes: 10

Release
- Original network: Channel 4
- Original release: 21 September – 23 November 2021

Series chronology
- ← Previous; Series 11 Next → Series 13

The twelfth series of The Great British Bake Off began airing on 21 September 2021. It is presented by Noel Fielding and Matt Lucas, and judged by returning judges Paul Hollywood and Prue Leith. The bakers were announced on 14 September 2021.

The series was won by Giuseppe Dell'Anno, with Chigs Parmar and Crystelle Pereira finishing as the runners-up. Dell'Anno is the first Italian winner of the programme.

== Bakers ==
Contestant	Age	Hometown	Occupation	Finish	Place
Tom Fletcher	28	Maidstone, England	Software developer	Episode 1	12th
Jairzinho Parris	51	London, England	Head of Finance	Episode 2	11th
Rochica Copeland	27	Birmingham, England	Junior HR business partner	Episode 3	10th
Maggie Richardson	70	Poole, England	Retired nurse and midwife	Episode 4	9th
Freya Cox	19	Scarborough, England	Student	Episode 5	8th
Amanda Georgiou	56	London, England	Metropolitan Police detective	Episode 6	7th
George Aristidou	34	London, England	Shared lives coordinator	Episode 7	6th
Lizzie Acker	28	Liverpool, England	Car production operative	Episode 8	5th
Jürgen Krauss	56	Brighton, England	Physicist	Episode 9	4th
Chigs Parmar	40	Leicester, England	Sales manager	Episode 10	Runner-up
Crystelle Pereira	26	London, England	Client relationship manager	Episode 10	Runner-up
Giuseppe Dell'Anno	45	Bristol, England	Chief engineer	Episode 10	1st

== Results summary ==
Baker	Episodes									
Baker	1	2	3	4	5	6	7	8	9	10
Giuseppe	HIGH	HIGH	SB	HIGH	SB	HIGH	HIGH	SAFE	LOW	WINNER
Chigs	SAFE	HIGH	SAFE	SB	SAFE	SAFE	HIGH	SB	HIGH	Runner-up
Crystelle	HIGH	SAFE	SAFE	SAFE	HIGH	SB	HIGH	LOW	SB	Runner-up
Jürgen	SB	SB	SAFE	HIGH	HIGH	SAFE	SB	HIGH	OUT	
Lizzie	SAFE	SAFE	HIGH	SAFE	SAFE	SAFE	LOW	OUT		
George	LOW	HIGH	SAFE	SAFE	LOW	LOW	OUT			
Amanda	LOW	LOW	SAFE	LOW	SAFE	OUT				
Freya	SAFE	SAFE	HIGH	LOW	OUT					
Maggie	HIGH	LOW	LOW	OUT						
Rochica	SAFE	SAFE	OUT							
Jairzeno	LOW	OUT								
Tom	OUT									

Colour key:

Baker was one of the judges' least favourite bakers that week, but was not eliminated.
Baker was one of the judges' favourite bakers that week, but was not the Star Baker.
Baker got through to the next round.
Baker was eliminated.
Baker was the Star Baker.
Baker was a series runner-up.
Baker was the series winner.

== Episodes ==
Colour key:

Baker was eliminated at conclusion of episode
Baker received a "Hollywood handshake" for respective bake
Baker was named "Star Baker" at conclusion of episode
Baker was named runner-up for the series
Baker won series

=== Episode 1: Cake ===
For the signature challenge, the bakers were tasked with making 12 decorative mini rolls in 2 hours. The technical challenge, set by Prue, required the bakers to make a malt loaf served with homemade butter in 2 hours. In the showstopper challenge, the bakers were given 4 hours to create an anti-gravity illusion cake, representing a precious memory.

Baker	Signature (12 Mini Decorative Rolls)	Technical (Malt Loaf)	Showstopper (Anti-Gravity Illusion Cake)	Result
Amanda	'Cherry Soldier' Mini Rolls	12th	Elderflower & Lemon Surf Explosion	Safe
Chigs	Strawberries & Cream Mini Rolls	11th	'Where it all Began'	Safe
Crystelle	'Chai and Chai Again' Mini Rolls	8th	'Bouq-cake' of Flowers	Safe
Freya	Vegan Lemon & Raspberry Mini Rolls	2nd	'Flower Potty'	Safe
George	Chocolate & Hazelnut Mini Rolls	3rd	Greek Table	Safe
Giuseppe	Easter Mini Rolls	10th	'Jack and The Beanstalk'	Safe
Jairzeno	Lime & Passion Fruit Mini Rolls	9th	'Kick the Can' Cake	Safe
Jürgen	Schwarzwald Mini Rolls	6th	'Night Time Reading'	Star Baker
Lizzie	Zoo Mini Rolls	4th	Nana's Peaches & Cream	Safe
Maggie	'Knit & Natter' Mini Rolls	1st	Ice-cream Cornet	Safe
Rochica	Colin Rolls	7th	Apple Cake	Safe
Tom	Black Forest Mini Rolls	5th	Classically Spectacular Showstopper	Eliminated

=== Episode 2: Biscuits ===
For the signature challenge, the bakers were tasked with making 24 identical brandy snaps in 2 hours. The technical challenge, set by Paul, required the bakers to make 12 sandwiched jammy biscuits, consisting of two baked biscuits, jam, and buttercream, in 1 hour and 45 minutes. For the showstopper challenge, the bakers needed to create a three-dimensional biscuit replica of a favorite childhood toy and needed to have an interactive element with it in 4 hours.

Baker	Signature (24 Brandy Snaps)	Technical (12 Sandwiched Jammy Biscuit)	Showstopper (3-D Childhood Toy)	Result
Amanda	'Open Sesame' Brandy Snaps	4th	Carousel Rocking Horse	Safe
Chigs	'Espresso Martini' Brandy Snaps	7th	Snooker Table	Safe
Crystelle	'Apple of My P-eye' Brandy Snaps	10th	Vanity Playset	Safe
Freya	'Brandy Snapuccinos'	3rd	'Winnie'	Safe
George	Cypriot Brandy Snaps	8th	'Paul & Prue Airlines'	Safe
Giuseppe	Gianduja Snaps	2nd	Reversi Board Game	Safe
Jairzeno	Chocolate, Passion Fruit & Pineapple Brandy Snaps	9th	Tall Ship	Eliminated
Jürgen	'A Cup of Chai' Brandy Snaps	1st	'Grandpa's Windmill'	Star Baker
Lizzie	Fast-Food Apple Pie Brandy Snaps	6th	'Paint a Truck'	Safe
Maggie	Blackcurrant Brandy Snaps	5th	Beach Playset	Safe
Rochica	Coffee Brandy Snaps	11th	Gingerbread Pinball Game	Safe

=== Episode 3: Bread ===
The signature challenge tasked the bakers with making a focaccia in 2 hours and 45 minutes. The technical challenge, set by Paul, tasked the bakers with making 15 olive and cheese ciabatta breadsticks, served with a tzatziki dip, in 2 hours. For the showstopper challenge, the bakers were asked to create a three-dimensional themed display using milk bread in 4 1/2 hours.

Baker	Signature (Focaccia)	Technical (15 Olive and Cheese Ciabatta Breadsticks)	Showstopper (Themed Milk Bread Display)	Result
Amanda	'Chasing Grainbows' Focaccia	3rd	'I Just FISH We Had More Time'	Safe
Chigs	Spanish Cheesy Meaty Focaccia	6th	Honey Milk Bread Picnic Basket	Safe
Crystelle	Feta & Grape Focaccia with Fennel & Walnut	9th	'Bready' for Sunday Roast	Safe
Freya	Mexican Fajita Focaccia	4th	'Under the Sea' Milk Bread Display	Safe
George	Greek Inspired Focaccia	7th	'The Very Hungry Koala'	Safe
Giuseppe	'Breakfast in Gaeta' Focaccia	1st	'Your Five-a-Day'	Star Baker
Jürgen	'Kipper-caccia' Focaccia	5th	'The Baby'	Safe
Lizzie	'Final Furlong' Focaccia	2nd	Pig Banquet	Safe
Maggie	Classic Focaccia	8th	'Things You'd Find in a Rock Pool'	Safe
Rochica	Roast Garlic Focaccia with Tomato, Feta & Pesto	10th	Birdcage	Eliminated

=== Episode 4: Desserts ===
The signature challenge tasked the bakers with making a beautifully decorated pavlova in 2 hours and 45 minutes. For the technical challenge, set by Prue, the bakers were asked to make 4 individual sticky toffee puddings, served with sticky toffee sauce, 2 tuile triangles, and a creme anglaise. The bakers had 90 minutes. For the showstopper challenge, the bakers were given the task of making a celebratory joconde imprimé dessert, composed of a highly decorated joconde sponge wrapped around at least 2 elements, in 4 1/2 hours.

Baker	Signature (Pavlova)	Technical (4 Sticky Toffee Pudding)	Showstopper (Joconde Imprimé Dessert)	Result
Amanda	'Chocolate Pav-Love'	8th	'Adam's Temptation' Imprimé Dessert	Safe
Chigs	Tropical Pavlova	3rd	Black Forest Imprimé Dessert	Star Baker
Crystelle	'Kiwi Lime Pie' Pam-lova	5th	'Una Piña Colada, Por Favor'	Safe
Freya	Peach Melba Vegan Pavlova	6th	Chocolate & Orange Imprimé Dessert	Safe
George	Lemon Curd & Biscuit Cream Pavlova	7th	Peanut Butter & Chocolate Imprimé Dessert	Safe
Giuseppe	'Every Day at the Beach' Pavlova	4th	Red Fruit & Pistachio Imprimé Dessert	Safe
Jürgen	'Passover Pavlova'	1st	'Passtyme with Good Companye'	Safe
Lizzie	Easter Pavlova	2nd	Liverpool Skyline Imprimé Dessert	Safe
Maggie	Traditional Pavlova	9th	Paris Skyline Imprimé Dessert	Eliminated

=== Episode 5: German ===
The signature challenge tasked the bakers with making 2 types of 12 German biscuits, which needed to be dipped, coated, or decorated, in 2 hours and 15 minutes. For the technical challenge, Prue asked the bakers to make a Prinzregententorte, consisting of eight thin layers of genoises sponge sandwiched with chocolate cream, coated with a shiny chocolate ganache, decorated with rosettes and tempered chocolate crowns, in 2 hours and 45 minutes. The showstopper gave the bakers 4 1/2 hours to produce a yeast-leavened cake. The cakes must be at least two-tiered and inspired by the yeasted cakes popular in Germany.

Baker	Signature (24 German Biscuits)	Technical (Prinzregententorte)	Showstopper (Yeast Leavened Cake)	Result
Amanda	Spritzgebäck & Glühweinplätzchen	8th	Rum. Plum & Raisin Cake	Safe
Chigs	Marzipan Hausfreunde & Almond Mandelhörnchen	2nd	Lemon & Mixed Peel Cake	Safe
Crystelle	Chocolate Engelsaugen & Pistachio Heidesand	7th	Bavarian Brioche	Safe
Freya	Lebkuchen & Zimtsterne	5th	Upside-down Cake	Eliminated
George	Cherry Marzipan Biscuits & Aniseed Springerle	6th	Chocolate & Tahini Anniversary Cake	Safe
Giuseppe	Bethmännchen & Italian Linzer Augen	1st	Amarena Cherry Cake	Star Baker
Jürgen	Tee-Sterne & Milchkaffee-Gipfele	4th	Beer Soaked Cake	Safe
Lizzie	Mandelhörnchen & Cheeky Boys	3rd	Bavarian Fairy Tale	Safe

=== Episode 6: Pastry ===
For the signature, the bakers were tasked with making 2 batches of glazed or iced chouxnuts: 6 filled and 6 not filled, to be done in 2 hours. For the technical challenge, Paul required the bakers to make a large baklava. They were asked to layer filo pastry with a pistachio and walnut filling, and cut into a star design, in 2 hours and 45 minutes. For the showstopper, the bakers were given the intricate task of making a terrine pie, in 4 1/2 hours. The pies needed to have an ornated pastry decoration on the outside and a neat pattern or design when cut open.

Baker	Signature (12 Chouxnuts)	Technical (Large Baklava)	Showstopper (Terrine Pie)	Result
Amanda	Sweet & Savoury Chouxnuts	5th	'Fancy Terrine Pie'	Eliminated
Chigs	'Oo La La Chouxnuts'	3rd	'Leicester Pork Pie'	Safe
Crystelle	Mango Maracujá & Miso Caramel Chouxnuts	2nd	'Lily Nana's Pickle Cottage'	Star Baker
George	Classic Chouxnuts	6th	'Christmas Dinner'	Safe
Giuseppe	Bellissima Chouxnuts	4th	'Laura's Terrine Pie'	Safe
Jürgen	'Exotic Flavour & 70's Colour'	1st	'Lunch in Freiburg'	Safe
Lizzie	Caramel & Floral Chouxnuts	7th	'Neptune Pie'	Safe

=== Episode 7: Caramel ===
For the first signature challenge, the bakers were required to produce a sharing-sized decorative caramel tart in 2 1/2 hours. The technical challenge was set by Paul where the bakers were tasked to make 10 caramel biscuit bars in 1 1/2 hour. For the showstopper challenge, the bakers were required to make a caramel-flavored dessert with a sugar-work dome or sphere in 4 1/2 hours.

Baker	Signature (Caramel Tart)	Technical (10 Caramel Biscuit Bars)	Showstopper (Domed or Sphered Caramel Dessert)	Result
Chigs	Chocolate, Coconut & Ginger Caramel Tart	3rd	'Caramel Mistake'	Safe
Crystelle	Apple, Pecan & Miso Caramel Tart	4th	'Grandad Greg's Cactus Garden'	Safe
George	Caramel Custard & Banana Tart	6th	Salted Caramel Almond & Hazelnut Dacquoise	Eliminated
Giuseppe	Apricot & Hazelnut Caramel Tart	1st	Salted Caramel & Praline Dessert	Safe
Jürgen	Triple Nut Caramel Delight	2nd	'Caramel Contrasts'	Star Baker
Lizzie	'My Tart Will Go On'	5th	'Roses Really Smell Like Caramel'	Safe

=== Episode 8: Free-from (Quarterfinals) ===
For the signature bake, the bakers were given the challenge of baking 8 dairy-free ice cream sandwiches in 3 hours The technical challenge was to make 8 identical vegan sausage rolls accompanied by a sticky red onion chutney in 2 hours. In the showstopper, the bakers needed to make a gluten-free celebration cake with at least two tiers. They were given 4 hours for the bake.

Baker	Signature (8 Dairy-free Iced Cream Sandwiches)	Technical (8 Vegan Sausage Rolls)	Showstopper (Gluten-free Celebration Cake)	Result
Chigs	Mum's Tropical Delight	1st	Gluten-Free Red Velvet Cake	Star Baker
Crystelle	Tahini and Miso Coffee Ice Cream Sandwiches	5th	'My Nana's Cascading Dress' Gluten-Free Cake	Safe
Giuseppe	Ginger and Orange Ice Cream Sandwich	2nd	Gluten-Free Black Forest Cake	Safe
Jürgen	'Meet My Favourites'	4th	Ultimate Gluten-Free Birthday Cake	Safe
Lizzie	Best Thing About Walks	3rd	Gluten-Free ‘Extraordinary' Cake	Eliminated

=== Episode 9: Pâtisserie (Semifinals) ===
In the semifinal signature challenge, the bakers were tasked to make eight pâtisserie-style layered slices in 3 hours. For the technical bake, set by Prue, the bakers are tasked in making a Sablé Breton Tart, consisting of a sablé breton pastry base, topped with raspberry confiture, piped with pistachio crème mousseline, filled with fresh berries and topped with glided meringue kisses and chocolate curls, all in two hours and forty-five minutes. A themed banquet display consisting of a crafted edible centrepiece surrounded by least twelve individual entremets desserts was set as the showstopper. The bakers were given five hours.

Baker	Signature (8 Pâtisserie-style Layered Slices)	Technical (Sablé Breton Tart)	Showstopper (Themed Banquet Display)	Result
Chigs	Raspberry & Chocolate Slices	4th	'The Apple Doesn't Fall Far from the Tree'	Safe
Crystelle	Yuzu, Coconut & Black Sesame Slices	3rd	'Tropical Wedding' Entremets	Star Baker
Giuseppe	Tiramisu Slices	2nd	'Leaning Tower of Pisa'	Safe
Jürgen	Murder at the Opera	1st	'Torii Gate in the Sea'	Eliminated (Note: Jürgen's elimination received public backlash following the episode's airing with Ofcom receiving 115 complaints.)

=== Episode 10: Final ===
The finalists were set the task of making a carrot cake in two hours and fifteen minutes for the signature challenge. For the final technical challenge, set by Paul, the bakers were given two hours and thirty minutes to create twelve Belgian buns filled with sultanas and lemon curd, with only two instructions given. For the ultimate showstopper challenge, the bakers were tasked to make a Mad Hatter tea party display with sweet and savory afternoon tea treats, showcasing at least four different baking disciplines in 4 1/2 hours. The judges expect to see the madness feel of Alice in Wonderland in the bakes.

Baker	Signature (Carrot Cake)	Technical (12 Belgian Buns)	Showstopper (Mad Hatter Tea Party Display)	Result
Chigs	'Take Two'	2nd	Party Treats	Runner-up
Crystelle	Pistachio, Cardamom & Orange Carrot Cake	1st	Crazy Tea Party	Runner-up
Giuseppe	'Torta Camilla'	3rd	'What Is the Hatter with Me'	Winner (Note: Giuseppe was the only finalist to kiss "Mr. Spatula," a prop of Noel Fielding's that can purportedly grant the finalist(s) the winning title if they "just...kiss [Mr. Spatula's] head.")

== Specials ==
Two specials were commissioned for the festive season:

=== The Great Christmas Bake Off ===
The Great Christmas Bake Off featured It's a Sin's Olly Alexander, Nathaniel Curtis, Lydia West and Shaun Dooley.

The signature challenge required the bakers to make a Christmas Dinner's leftovers pie, in two hours, it can be made with any type of pastry, but the fillings must be made with leftovers from the baker's favorite Christmas Dinner. Prue's technical challenge tasked the bakers with making a chocolate Yule Log, in one hour and fifteen minutes. The bakers were given 3 hours to make a Christmas Tree out of biscuit or meringue for the showstopper challenge.

Baker	Signature (Christmas Dinner's leftovers pie)	Technical (Chocolate Yule Log)	Showstopper (Biscuit/Meringue Christmas Tree)	Result
Lydia	Tom Yum Turkey Christmas Pie	4th	Lemon Sablé Biscuit Christmas Tree	Runner-up
Nathaniel	Turkey & Pancetta Christmas Leftovers Pie	1st	Orange & Cinnamon Christmas Tree	Winner
Olly	Curried Vegetable Pie	3rd	Meringue Christmas Tree	Runner-up
Shaun	Turkey & Ham Leftover Pie	2nd	Pistachio Meringue Christmas Tree	Runner-up

=== The Great New Year Bake Off ===
The Great New Year Bake Off features Jon Jenkins and Kim-Joy Hewlett from Series 9, along with Rowan Williams and Hermine Dossou from Series 11.

For the signature challenge, the bakers were asked to create twelve buns, suitable for a New Year's day Breakfast, the buns can be any flavor or shape, but must be yeasted and feature a topping of the baker's choice, three hours are given. Paul's technical challenge required the bakers to make a New Years Eve cake inspired by the traditional Greek Vasilopita, consisting of a perfectly baked lemon mahleb and mastika sponge and decorated with water icing, lemon curd and crystallized citrus peel in one hour and thirty minutes. A shadow box winter scene with a frame, to all be created with at least three different biscuits in four hours is the showstopper.

Baker	Signature (12 buns for a New Years Breakfast)	Technical (Vasilopita)	Showstopper (Shadow Box Winter Scene)	Result
Hermine	Apricot Custard Crumble Buns	3rd	'Festive Outdoors' Shadow Box	Runner-up
Jon	'Bacon & Eggs' Pecan & Maple Buns	4th	'Our Dream Wedding Scene' Shadow Box	Runner-up
Kim-Joy	Sticky Pecan Breakfast Buns	1st	Cosy Winter Scene Shadow Box	Winner
Rowan	'Fried Egg' Breakfast Buns	2nd	Winter Dream Shadow box	Runner-up

== Ratings ==
Bake Off launched with 5.7 million viewers and a 30.8% share—its lowest overnight rating since its move to Channel 4 in 2017—down 1.3 million in 2020. However, it was the show's biggest ever launch episode on Channel 4 in terms of younger viewers, securing 61.9% of all young viewers watching TV at the time of broadcast.

Episode no.	Airdate	7-day viewers (millions)	28-day viewers (millions)	Channel 4 weekly ranking	Weekly ranking all channels
1	21 September 2021	9.57	10.18	1	3
2	28 September 2021	8.98	9.64	1	2
3	5 October 2021	8.69	9.39	1	2
4	12 October 2021	8.75	9.13	1	2
5	19 October 2021	8.71	9.27	1	3
6	26 October 2021	9.15	9.57	1	2
7	2 November 2021	9.05	9.50	1	2
8	9 November 2021	9.05	9.49	1	3
9	16 November 2021	9.39	9.61	1	3
10	23 November 2021	9.61	9.73	1	3
