= The Great British Bake Off series 10 =

Tenth series of The Great British Bake Off

The Great British Bake Off
- Series 10
- Presented by: Noel Fielding; Sandi Toksvig
- Judges: Paul Hollywood; Prue Leith
- No. of contestants: 13
- Winner: David Atherton
- Runners-up: Alice Fevronia; Steph Blackwell
- Location: Welford Park, near Newbury, Berkshire
- No. of max. bakes: 30
- No. of episodes: 10

Release
- Original network: Channel 4
- Original release: 27 August – 29 October 2019

Series chronology
- ← Previous; Series 9 Next → Series 11

The tenth series of The Great British Bake Off began on 27 August 2019. It was presented by returning hosts Noel Fielding and Sandi Toksvig, and judged by returning judges Paul Hollywood and Prue Leith.

The series was won by David Atherton, who became the first winner never to have won the Star Baker title since it was introduced. Alice Fevronia and Steph Blackwell finished as runners-up. This series started with 13 bakers instead of the usual 12, which meant one episode featured a double elimination, as was previously done in the fourth series.

== Bakers ==
Contestant	Age	Hometown	Occupation	Finish	Place
Dan Chambers	32	Rotherham, England	Support worker	Episode 1	13th
Jamie Finn	20	Surrey, England	Part-time waiter	Episode 2	12th
Amelia Le Bruin	24	Halifax, England	Fashion designer	Episode 3	11th
Phil Thorne	56	Rainham, England	HGV driver	Episode 4	10th
Helena Garcia	40	Leeds, England	Online project manager	Episode 5	8th (tie)
Michelle Evans-Fecci	35	Tenby, Wales	Print shop administrator	Episode 5	8th (tie)
Priya O'Shea	34	Leicester, England	Marketing consultant	Episode 6	7th
Michael Chakraverty	26	Stratford-upon-Avon, England	Theatre manager/fitness instructor	Episode 7	6th
Henry Bird	20	Durham, England	Student	Episode 8	5th
Rosie Brandreth-Poynter	28	Somerset, England	Veterinary surgeon	Episode 9	4th
Alice Fevronia	28	Essex, England	Geography teacher	Episode 10	Runner-up
Steph Blackwell	28	Chester, England	Shop assistant	Episode 10	Runner-up
David Atherton	36	Whitby, England	International health adviser	Episode 10	1st

== Results summary ==
Elimination chart
Baker	1	2	3	4	5	6	7	8	9	10
David	SAFE	HIGH	SAFE	HIGH	HIGH	HIGH	HIGH	HIGH	LOW	WINNER
Alice	SAFE	SB	LOW	SAFE	SAFE	HIGH	SAFE	SAFE	SB	Runner-up
Steph	HIGH	SAFE	HIGH	SB	SB	SB	HIGH	SB	HIGH	Runner-up
Rosie	SAFE	HIGH	SAFE	SAFE	LOW	LOW	LOW	LOW	OUT	
Henry	SAFE	SAFE	LOW	SAFE	HIGH	LOW	SB	OUT		
Michael	SAFE	SAFE	SB	LOW	SAFE	LOW	OUT			
Priya	SAFE	SAFE	SAFE	LOW	LOW	OUT				
Helena	SAFE	SAFE	SAFE	SAFE	OUT					
Michelle	SB	SAFE	SAFE	SAFE	OUT					
Phil	SAFE	SAFE	SAFE	OUT						
Amelia	SAFE	LOW	OUT							
Jamie	LOW	OUT								
Dan	OUT									

Colour key:

Baker was one of the judges' least favourite bakers that week, but was not eliminated.
Baker was one of the judges' favourite bakers that week, but was not the Star Baker.
Baker got through to the next round.
Baker was eliminated.
Baker was the Star Baker.
Baker was a series runner-up.
Baker was the series winner.

== Episodes ==
Colour key:

Baker was eliminated at conclusion of episode
Baker received a "Hollywood handshake" for respective bake
Baker was named "Star Baker" at conclusion of episode
Baker was named runner-up for the series
Baker won series

=== Episode 1: Cake ===
For the signature challenge, the bakers had to bake a fruit cake in the shape of their choice, with a significant amount of dried fruit, and lavish decoration in 2 1/2 hours. For the technical challenge set by Prue, the bakers had to bake 6 identical angel cake slices, with layers made of genoise sponge sandwiched with Italian meringue buttercream, topped with icing and feathered in 1 3/4 hours. For the showstopper challenge, the bakers baked the birthday cake they always dreamed of as a child in 4 hours.

Baker	Signature (Fruitcake)	Technical (6 Angel Cake Slices)	Showstopper (Birthday Cake)	Result
Alice	Gingerbread Fruit Cake Wreath	5th	Like a Child in a Sweetshop Cake	Safe
Amelia	Christmas Cake	4th	Carousel Birthday Cake	Safe
David	Squishy Squashy Fruit Cake	10th	Snakey Birthday Cakey	Safe
Dan	Jamaican Rum Cake	9th	Pirate Island Cake	Eliminated
Helena	Fruit Bat Cake	12th	Away with the Fairies Cake	Safe
Henry	Wood Street Cake	1st	Secret Woodland Cake	Safe
Jamie	Easter Simnel Cake	13th	Salted Caramel Schnauzer Birthday Cake	Safe
Michael	Cup of Chai Cake	11th	Treasure Chest Cake	Safe
Michelle	Bara Brith Teulu Ni (Our Family's Bara Brith)	6th	Tŷ Tylwyth Teg (Fairy House Cake)	Star Baker
Phil	Spiced Fruit Cake with Rum Glaze	8th	Retro Rocket Cake	Safe
Priya	Sunshine Fruit Cake	7th	Once Upon a Time Cake	Safe
Rosie	Spicy Chai Loaf	2nd	Magical Jungle Cake	Safe
Steph	Great Grandma's Fruit Cake	3rd	A Sundae on the Beach Cake	Safe

=== Episode 2: Biscuits ===
For the signature challenge this week, the bakers were tasked to make 12 decorated chocolate biscuit bars in 2 1/2 hours. For the technical challenge, Paul tasked a "controversial" bake that was his dad's favourite—12 fig rolls which were identical in shape and size—in 90 minutes. For the showstopper, the bakers were asked to create a 3D biscuit sculpture in 4 hours.

Baker	Signature (12 Decorated Chocolate Biscuit Bars)	Technical (12 Fig Rolls)	Showstopper (3D Biscuit Sculpture)	Result
Alice	Honeycomb Peanut Mallow Bars	1st	Chocolate and Coconut New Zealand Lamb	Star Baker
Amelia	Pistachio, Almond & Raisin Nougat Biscuit Bars	9th	Swimming with Dolphins	Safe
David	Coco-nutty Chocolate Bars	2nd	Wedding Spray	Safe
Helena	Wicked Witch Fingers	12th	Caught in a Spider's Web	Safe
Henry	Coffee, Cardamom & Hazelnut Bars	6th	Chapel Organ	Safe
Jamie	Cherry Caramel Shortbread Biscuit Bars	11th	Biscuit Guitar	Eliminated
Michael	Lemon & Rosemary Biscuit Bars	4th	Hamish the Highland Cow	Safe
Michelle	Bakewell Bars	8th	Dewi y Ddraig Cymraeg – Dewi the Welsh Dragon	Safe
Phil	Orange, Cranberry & White Chocolate Fudge Bars	3rd	Tina the Tortoise	Safe
Priya	Ruby Barfi Biscuit Bars	7th	The Beast of Rocky Mountain	Safe
Rosie	Virgin Mojito Biscuit Bars	5th	My Favourite Chicken – A Celebration of Legs	Safe
Steph	Chocolate, Caramel Macchiato Biscuit Bars	10th	Ginger the Cat	Safe

=== Episode 3: Bread ===
For this week's signature challenge, the bakers were asked to make a filled tear & share loaf from a yeasted dough in 3 hours. Paul's technical challenge required the bakers to make 8 burger baps along with 4 veggie burgers to go inside half of them in 2 1/2 hours. The showstopper challenge required the bakers to make a display of artistically scored decorative loaves (minimum of 2 loaves) in 5 hours.

Baker	Signature (Tear & Share Loaf)	Technical (8 White Burger Baps & 4 Veggie Burgers)	Showstopper (Decorative Loaf Display)	Result
Alice	Baklava Tear & Share	7th	Global Bread	Safe
Amelia	Chorizo Brunch Tear & Share	11th	Caterpillar Transformation	Eliminated
David	Cinnamon Swirl Tear & Share	2nd	Trio of African Masks	Safe
Helena	Frosted Cinnamon and Pecan Tear & Share	8th	Every Bread is Halloween	Safe
Henry	Chicken and Pesto Tear & Share	1st	Herb Garden	Safe
Michael	Keralan Star Bread Tear & Share	6th	Mediterranean Camp Fire	Star Baker
Michelle	Noson Caws (Cheese Night)	5th	Gardd Ni (Our Garden)	Safe
Phil	Pancetta and Cheese Focaccia Tear & Share	10th	Winner's Wreath	Safe
Priya	Smokey Jalapeño Tear & Share	4th	Bird Boules	Safe
Rosie	Chilli and Manchego Tear & Share	9th	Bread Safari	Safe
Steph	Sun-Dried Tomato and Pesto Star Tear & Share	3rd	Hand-Tied Bouquet of Flowers	Safe

=== Episode 4: Dairy ===
For the signature challenge this week, Paul and Prue tasked the bakers with a dairy cake, but the cake mixture needed to contain a cultured dairy product, to be done in 2 hours and 15 minutes. For the technical challenge, Prue asked the bakers to make a difficult bake that dated back to the Tudor times, 12 Maids of Honours, in 2 hours. For the showstopper challenge, the judges gave the bakers the task of making a display of milk-based Indian sweets known as Mishti, in 3 1/2 hours.

Baker	Signature (Cultured Dairy Cake)	Technical (12 Maids of Honours)	Showstopper (Display of Mishti)	Result
Alice	Leafy Yoghurt Cake	8th	Afternoon Tea	Safe
David	A Kick of Limoncello Cake	2nd	Flavours of India Mishti	Safe
Helena	Ghost Cake	9th	Ye Olde English Sweet Shoppe Mishti	Safe
Henry	Ode to a German Breakfast Cake	3rd	Seaside Mishti	Safe
Michael	Cheesecake Surprise	7th	Flag of India Mishti	Safe
Michelle	Homely Rhubarb Cake	5th	Home Comforts Mishti	Safe
Phil	Trucking Lovely Rose Cake	6th	A Corner of My Garden Mishti	Eliminated
Priya	Choc-chip Banana Cake	10th	Flavours of My Childhood Mishti	Safe
Rosie	A Good Dose of Limoncello Cake	4th	Cocktails & Canapés Mishti	Safe
Steph	Answer to Everything Cake	1st	Pink and Pretty Mishti	Star Baker

=== Episode 5: The Roaring Twenties ===
For the signature challenge, the bakers had 2 1/2 hours to produce 4 custard pies which should be elaborately decorated with the theme of the 1920s. For the technical challenge set by Prue, the bakers faced the difficult task of deep-frying Choux pastry to produce 18 beignet soufflés filled with raspberry jam and served with a zabaglione, in 1 1/2 hours. For the showstopper challenge, the bakers were asked to create a cocktail theme cake, with at least two tiers, in memory of the prohibition era in the United States, in 4 hours.

Baker	Signature (4 Custard Pies)	Technical (18 Beignet Soufflés)	Showstopper (Prohibition Era Cake)	Result
Alice	Chocolate & Orange Custard Pies	6th	Piña Colada Cake	Safe
David	Fancy Custards	9th	Amaretto Sour Cake	Safe
Helena	Lemon and Lavender Pies	1st	Vampire's Kiss Raspberry Vodka Cake	Eliminated
Henry	1920's Pies	3rd	White Russian Cake	Safe
Michael	Mango, Lime & Ginger Pies	8th	Brambling Cake	Safe
Michelle	Blueberry & White Chocolate Crème Brûlée Pies	7th	My Little Sister the Dancing Queen's Piña Colada Cake	Eliminated
Priya	Lemon & Raspberry Ripple Pies	2nd	Meena Colada Cake	Safe
Rosie	Little Blackberry Pies	5th	White Russian Cake	Safe
Steph	Zesty Citrus Custard Pies	4th	Sour Lime Piña Colada Cake	Star Baker

=== Episode 6: Desserts ===
For the signature challenge this week, the bakers were asked to make a layered meringue cake with a minimum of 3 layers and "large enough to share with friends" in 2 hours and 45 minutes. For the technical challenge, Prue gave the bakers a particularly difficult task that tested the bakers' precision, 6 identical layered verrines, in 2 1/2 hours. For the showstopper challenge, the bakers were tasked with an explosive bake, a celebratory bombe, in 4 1/2 hours.

Baker	Signature (Layered Meringue Cake)	Technical (6 Verrines)	Showstopper (Celebratory Bombe)	Result
Alice	Black Forest Meringue	1st	Tiramisu Bombe	Safe
David	Spiced Meringue Surprise	2nd	Delightful Bombe	Safe
Henry	Towering Meringue Cake	4th	Bonfire Bombe	Safe
Michael	Dark Chocolate Meringue Cake	6th	Black Forest Bombe	Safe
Priya	Family Favourite	7th	Summer Fruit Bombe	Eliminated
Rosie	Layers of Lime and Raspberry	5th	Ruby Bombe	Safe
Steph	Eton Mess	3rd	Mirror Bombe	Star Baker

=== Episode 7: Festivals ===
For the signature challenge, the bakers were asked to make 24 buns with the theme of a festival or holiday from around the world in 3e hours. For the technical challenge, Paul tasked the bakers with a deep fried pastry treat traditionally served during the Italian Carnevale, 12 Sicilian Cassatelles, in 1 hour and 15 minutes. For the showstopper challenge, the bakers were set with the complex task of making a kek lapis sarawak, a traditional layered Malaysian cake, in 4 hours and 15 minutes.

Baker	Signature (24 Festival Buns)	Technical (12 Sicilian Cassatelles)	Showstopper (Kek Lapis Sarawak)	Result
Alice	Lemon, Blueberry & Almond Hot Cross Buns	6th	Chocolate, Orange and Salted Caramel Kaleidoscope Sarawak Style Layered Cake	Safe
David	Kozunak Plaits	2nd	Sarawak Style Layer Cake Sculpture	Safe
Henry	Chocolate Kardemummabullar	3rd	Elegant Present Box	Star Baker
Michael	Figgy Pudding Hot Cross Buns	5th	Jamaican Mule Sarawak Style Layer Cake	Eliminated
Rosie	Mardi Gras Finnish Semlor Peacock Festival Buns	1st	Rainbow Sarawak Style Layer Cake	Safe
Steph	Zest and Spice Hot Cross Buns	4th	Orange and Chai Spiced Revitalise Cake	Safe

=== Episode 8: Pastry (Quarterfinals) ===
For the signature challenge, the bakers were tasked to do a savoury twist on a usually sweet French classic, tarte tatin, in 2 1/2 hours. For the technical challenge, the bakers were given the challenging task of recreating a Moroccan Pie made from warka pastry, also known as brik pastry, in 2 1/2 hours. For the showstopper challenge, the bakers were asked to create a vertical pie consisting of at least 2 separate pies in 4 hours.

Baker	Signature (Savoury Tarte Tatin)	Technical (Moroccan Pie)	Showstopper (Vertical Pie)	Result
Alice	Leek, Apple & Goat's Cheese Tarte Tatin	3rd	Apple Tree House Pie	Safe
David	Caramelly Carroty Tarte Tatin	1st	Whitby Fish Pie	Safe
Henry	Crab, Tomato & New Potato Tarte Tatin	5th	Chandelier Picnic Pie	Eliminated
Rosie	Shallot, Aubergine & Goat's Cheese Spiced Tarte Tatin	2nd	Rapunzel's Tower	Safe
Steph	Caramelised Onion & Goat's Cheese Tarte Tatin	4th	Curried Chickpea & Potato Carousel Pie	Star Baker

=== Episode 9: Pâtisserie (Semifinal) ===
For the signature challenge, the bakers had 2 1/2 hours to make 8 identically decorated domed tarts. Prue's technical challenge was making a Gâteau Saint Honoré, a French classic involving both choux and puff pastry, plus a large amount of cream fillings, all in 3 1/2 hours. For the showstopper challenge, the bakers were given the difficult task of making a sugar glass display case, enclosing a display of pâtisserie or other lavish baked goods, in 4 1/2 hours.

Baker	Signature (8 Domed Tarts)	Technical (Gâteau Saint Honoré)	Showstopper (Sugar Glass Display Case)	Result
Alice	Mocha, Hazelnut & Orange Domed Tarts	4th	Save Our Oceans	Star Baker
David	Aperitif Domed Tarts	2nd	Greenhouse Growing Moss	Safe
Rosie	Lemon, Raspberry & Mint Domed Tarts	1st	Time with Family	Eliminated
Steph	Raspberry, Lemon & White Chocolate Domed Tarts	3rd	A Night at the Opera	Safe

=== Episode 10: Final ===
For the final signature challenge, the remaining three bakers were given 2 hours to create the ultimate chocolate cake that should be rich in chocolate and be beautifully decorated. For the final technical challenge, set by Paul, the bakers were given 1 hour and 10 minutes to create 6 twice-baked stilton soufflés, each served with a lavash cracker. For the final showstopper challenge, the bakers were required to create a deceptive illusion picnic basket feast composed of cakes, biscuits and enriched breads that were presented to look like something else in 4 1/2 hours. Unofficially, Alice could be considered the first runner up as Prue and Paul said it was between the two of them at the end.

Baker	Signature (Ultimate Chocolate Cake)	Technical (6 Stilton Soufflés)	Showstopper (Illusion Picnic Basket Feast)	Result
Alice	Chocolate, Pear, Ginger and Maple Cake	2nd	End of the School Year Celebration Picnic	Runner-up
David	Chocolate, Armagnac and Prune Cake	1st	Peachy Pic-Nik	Winner
Steph	Black Forest Chocolate Cake	3rd	Picnic in the Park	Runner-up

== Specials ==
Two festive specials were commissioned during Christmas Day and New Year’s Day.

=== The Great Christmas Bake Off ===
The Great Christmas Bake Off featured Briony Williams and Terry Hartill from Series 9, along with Tom Hetherington and Yan Tsou from Series 8. The special was won by Briony Williams.

In the signature challenge, the returning bakers were first asked to make 24 festive cake pops in 2 1/2 hours. They then faced the technical challenge set by Paul, where they had to recreate a festive sausage roll wreath in 2 hours. For the festive showstopper challenge, the bakers were given the task of constructing a 3D gingerbread building, topped off with at least two different types of confectionery, in 4 hours.

Baker	Signature (24 Cake Pops)	Technical (Festive Sausage Roll Wreath)	Showstopper (Gingerbread Building)	Result
Briony	'Festive Frolic' Pops	4th	'Santa's Train Station'	Winner
Terry	'Christmas Carousel' Pops	3rd	'Christmas in New York'	Runner-up
Tom	'Santa & Co watch the Queen's Speech' Pops	1st	'Edinburgh Christmas'	Runner-up
Yan	'A Very British Christmas' Pops	2nd	‘Follow the Yellow Brick Road House'	Runner-up

=== The Great Festive Bake Off ===
The Great Festive Bake Off saw the cast of Derry Girls (Saoirse-Monica Jackson, Nicola Coughlan, Jamie-Lee O’Donnell, Dylan Llewellyn and Siobhan McSweeney) take on the three challenges on New Years Day. For the signature challenge, they had to make a trifle that is large enough for a party or a soiree and needs to have at least 3 layers (a biscuit or cake layer, a custard made from scratch layer, a layer of their choice) in 2 1/2 hours. For the technical challenge, set by Prue, they were tasked to make 12 salmon and beetroot blinis that needs to be finished with horseradish and beetroot topping and garnished with hot salmon and caviar, in 1 hour. For their showstopper challenge, they were asked to bake a cake of their favourite decade. The cake needs to consist of at least 2 tiers and beautifully decorated in 2 1/2 hours.

Baker	Signature (Trifle)	Technical (12 Salmon and Beetroot Blinis)	Showstopper (Decade Cake)	Result
Dylan	White Chocolate, Raspberry, and Sherry Trifle	5th	1960s Camper Van Decade Cake	Runner-up
Jamie-Lee	Chocolate and Orange Trifle	4th	1930's Amelia Earhart Cake	Runner-up
Nicola	Strawberry and Rhubarb Trifle	3rd	1930's Cabaret Cake	Runner-up
Saoirse-Monica	Irish Cream Trifle	2nd	Peace & Love 1960's Cake	Winner
Siobhan	Betsy's Trifle	1st	Camping in Cork Cake	Runner-up

== Post-show careers ==
David Atherton published a cookbook after winning the series. Released in 2020, it is a children's cookbook titled My First Cookbook. Follow-up versions My First Green Cookbook and Bake, Make and Learn to Cook released in 2021. In May 2021, Atherton released Good to Eat, which focuses on delivering healthy twists to classic recipes.

Steph Blackwell contributed to The Big Book of Amazing Cakes, and published her own cookbook, The Joy of Baking, in 2021.

== Ratings ==
The first episode drew an overnight audience of 5.7 million, down 400,000 from the previous series, but with a higher audience share in its time slot than the previous launch at 30.6%. The overnight ratings for the final episode dropped by over half a million compared to the previous series with an average audience of 6.9 million viewers.

Episode no.	Airdate	7-day viewers (millions)	28-day viewers (millions)	Channel 4 weekly ranking	Weekly ranking all channels
1	27 August 2019	9.62	10.03	1	
2	3 September 2019	9.38	9.80	1	
3	10 September 2019	8.94	9.42	1	
4	17 September 2019	8.96	9.49	1	2
5	24 September 2019	9.26	9.64	1	2
6	1 October 2019	8.70	9.19	1	3
7	8 October 2019	8.98	9.42	1	3
8	15 October 2019	9.19	9.48	1	3
9	22 October 2019	9.34	9.67	1	3
10	29 October 2019	10.05	10.21	1	3

== Reception ==
Michael Hogan of The Daily Telegraph criticised the series as "forgettable" and "dullest" out of the first ten series so far, attributing the show's move to Channel 4, casting "blandly millennial crop of contestants", and lack of diversity at the end, e.g. fewer contestants older than forty this series compared to prior nine series—two who were eliminated by the fifth week of the series. He further wrote:

The final six were all white and middle-class. Three of the four semi-finalists were, uncannily, aged 28. Many viewers own cookbooks older than that.
