= Finalists of The Great British Bake Off =

The Great British Bake Off is a British reality baking competition television series. Below are the lists of its finalists—only winners and runners-up:

- Finalists of The Great British Bake Off (series 1–7), BBC Two (series 1–4, 2010–2013) and then BBC One (series 4–7, 2014–2016)
- Finalists of The Great British Bake Off (series 8–present), 2017–present, Channel 4

== See also ==
- List of The Great British Bake Off contestants
