= Maid of honour (disambiguation) =

A maid of honour is a junior attendant of a queen in a royal household.

Maid of honour or Maid of honor may also refer to:

- a senior bridesmaid
- Maids of honour tart, traditional English dish
- The Maid of Honour, a Jacobean era stage play
- Maid of Honour (album), a 2026 album by Canadian rapper Drake

== See also ==
- Made of Honor, a 2008 film
