= Kim-Joy =

British baker and cook book author

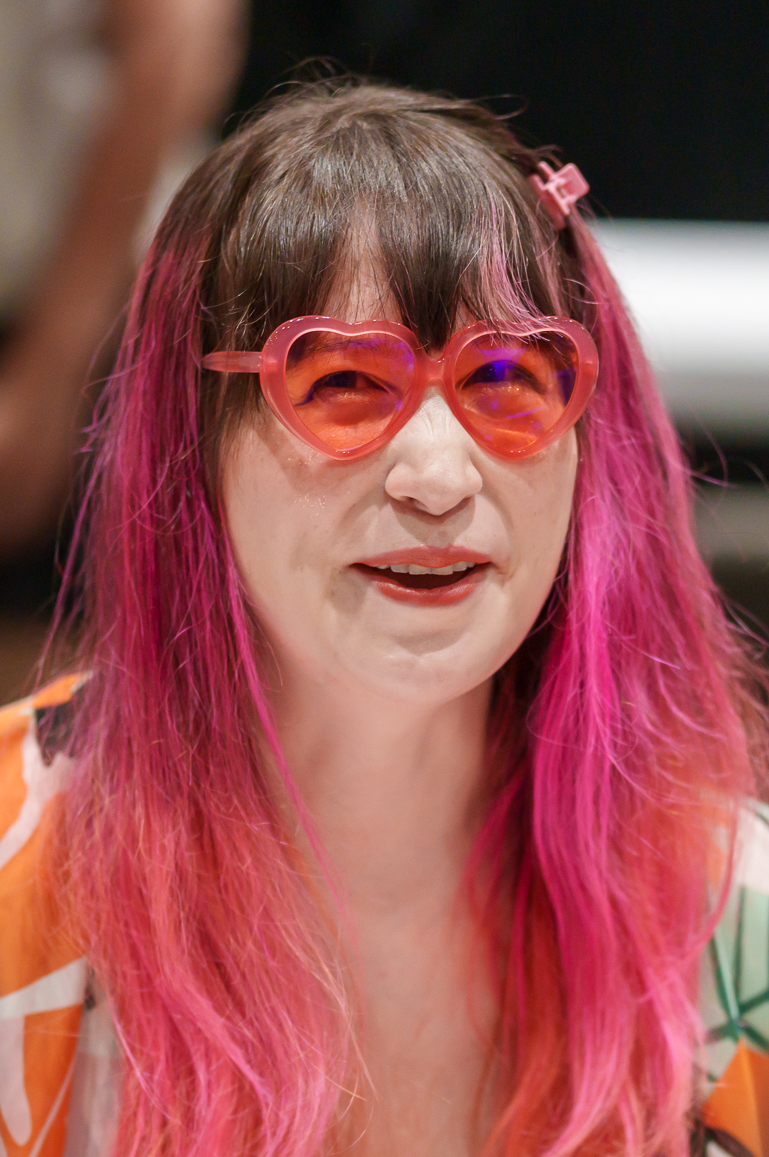
- Kim-Joy at 2025 GalaxyCon in New Orleans
- Born: Kim-Joy Hewlett; 1990 or 1991 (age 35–36); Ottignies, Belgium
- Other name: Kim-Joy Homsi
- Occupations: Baker, author
- Spouse: Nabil Homsi (m. 2022)

Kim-Joy (born Kim-Joy Hewlett, c. 1991) is a British baker and cookbook writer. She became one of two runners-up in the ninth series (2018) of The Great British Bake Off and won Bake Off's New Year 2022 special. She has written three cookbooks and is known for creating decorative baked goods often featuring whimsical themes and cute renderings of animals.

== Early life and education ==
Kim-Joy Homsi was born c. 1991 in Ottignies, Belgium to an English father and a Malaysian Chinese mother; she has extended family in Malaysia. Her mother was studying in London when she was deported for overworking her student visa and ended up in Belgium, where she found work as an au pair for an Englishman and his wife; that marriage ended and Kim-Joy's mother married her father.

Kim-Joy has two brothers. The family moved to London when she was five; she has described a "chaotic" childhood during which her family "just stopped" celebrating Christmas. She was interested in art. She has described her extreme social anxiety as a teen, including selective mutism. None of her family has baked much, and her interest in baking grew when she began attending university. She bakes in an effort to socialise more.

Kim-Joy received a bachelor's degree in sociology from the University of Bristol and a master's degree in psychology from Leeds Beckett University.

== Career ==
Kim-Joy worked in a care home and then as a psychological wellbeing practitioner for the National Health Service. She had as many as 150 patients at a time.

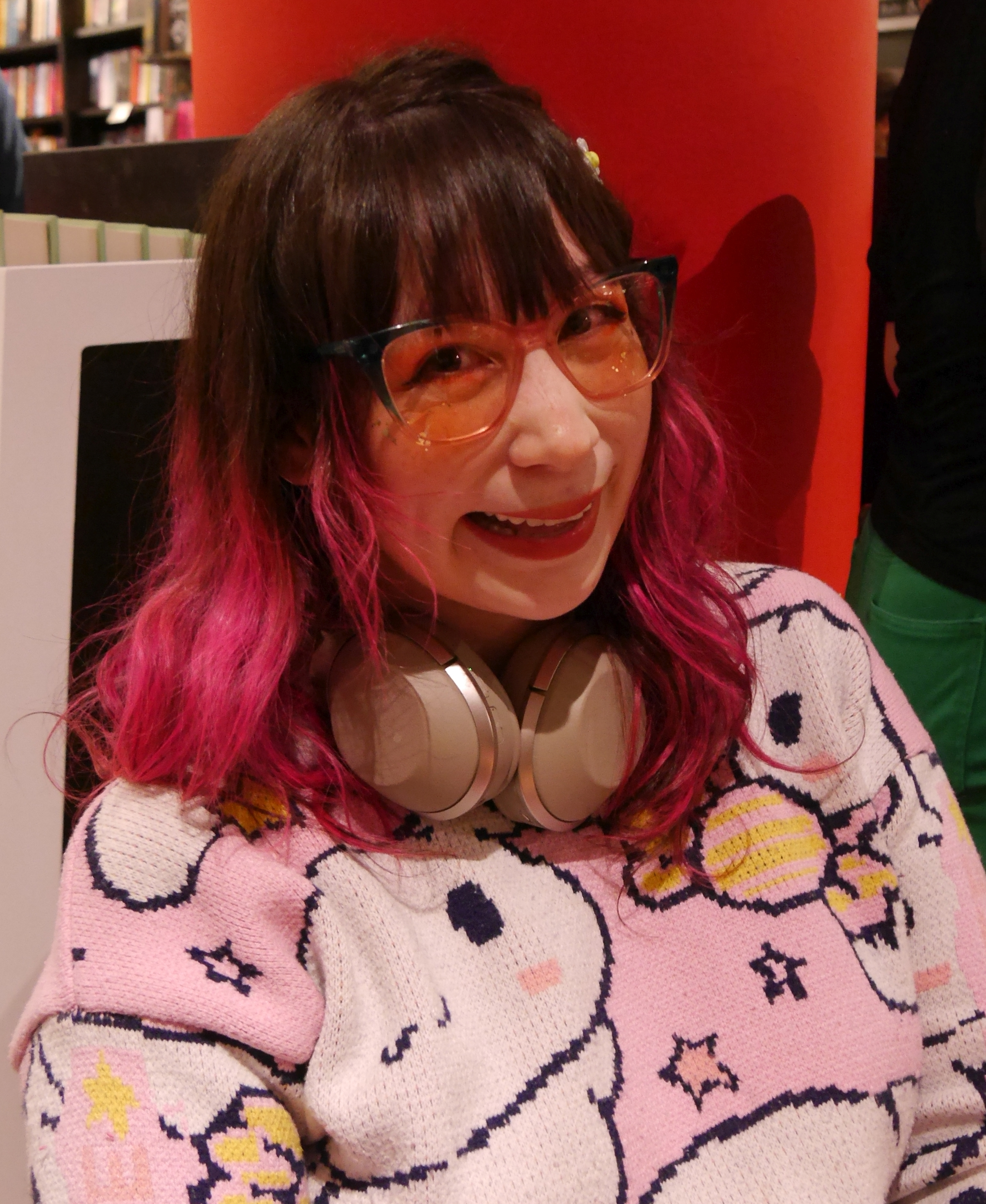
Kim-Joy in Waterstones London in 2023

Friends had encouraged Kim-Joy to apply to be a contestant on The Great British Bake Off, but until 2018 she "didn't feel confident enough". She joined the cast of the ninth series of The Great British Bake Off, which aired in 2018. According to The Guardian, she "became known on the show for her intense commitment to cuteness"; it called the decision to cast her in the show "genius". The Independent said she was "undoubtedly one of the highlights of this year’s series, delighting viewers with her creative designs and cheerful demeanour." The Takeout said her "uncanny ability to make things that are so cute that by all rights I should be over-dosing on the sweetness, yet somehow never actually crossing that line" was her "superpower". The Sunday Post said in 2020 that in the franchise's then ten-year history, "no contestant has embodied the wholesome warmth of Bake Off more" than Kim-Joy. On the show she was known for her colorful decorative bakes, often with whimsical animal themes.

Kim-Joy told only her partner and "a couple of friends" that she was competing, excusing her social absence to others with what she called "the most bizarre excuses". She advanced to the finale and became one of two runners-up, losing to Rahul Mandal.

Kim-Joy appeared in The Great New Year Bake Off January 2022 special, competing against fellow series-nine participant Jon Jenkins and two Series 11 contestants, Hermine and Rowan Williams. Kim-Joy won that competition.

Kim-Joy is known for her "signature" cute baked goods. She has written three cookbooks and as of 2021 was a baking columnist for The Guardian. Food & Wine, reviewing her first cookbook, said her bakes were "almost too adorable to eat". Library Journal said the book "channels her positive outlook and vibrant imagination into a joyful cookbook bursting with whimsical bakes" but that "some recipes and decorating techniques are quite complicated, and impractical for the typical home baker".

== Board game ==
In 2022 Skybound Games published Kim Joy's Magic Bakery, a cooperative card game in which players run a bakery in a magic forest. The game was designed by Ben Kepner and illustrated by Linda Van Den Berg. Kim-Joy is an avid board gamer.

== Advocacy ==
She works with Wren Bakery, which provides baking and barista training for unemployed and underemployed women in Leeds.

== Personal life ==
In 2022 Kim-Joy married long-time partner Nabil Homsi, whom she had met nine years earlier through their mutual interest in board games; Homsi owns four board games shops in Leeds. The couple had been living in Leeds but moved to Ilkley during the COVID-19 lockdowns. Kim-Joy has discussed her ongoing mental health issues surrounding anxiety and depression.

Kim-Joy avoided using her father's surname publicly. She took Homsi's name when they married.

== Selected bibliography ==
- Kim-Joy (2019). Baking with Kim-Joy: cute and creative bakes to make you smile. ISBN 978-1-78713-458-4. OCLC 1110916191.
- Kim-Joy (2021). Christmas with Kim-Joy: a festive collection of edible cuteness. ISBN 978-1-78713-582-6. OCLC 1140676632.
- Kim-Joy (2021). Celebrate with Kim-Joy: cute cakes and bakes to make every occasion joyful. ISBN 978-1-78713-789-9. OCLC 1263786380.
- Kim-Joy (2023). Turtle Bread: A Graphic Novel About Baking, Fitting In, and the Power of Friendship. Alti Firmansyah (illustration) and Joamette Gill (lettering). Milwaukie, Oregon: Dark Horse Books. ISBN 978-1-5067-3098-1.
- Kim-Joy (2023). Bake Me a Cat: 50 Purrfect Recipes for Edible Kitty Cakes, Cookies and More!. ISBN 978-1-78713-941-1. OCLC 1363814162.
