= Zimtstern =

German Christmas cookie

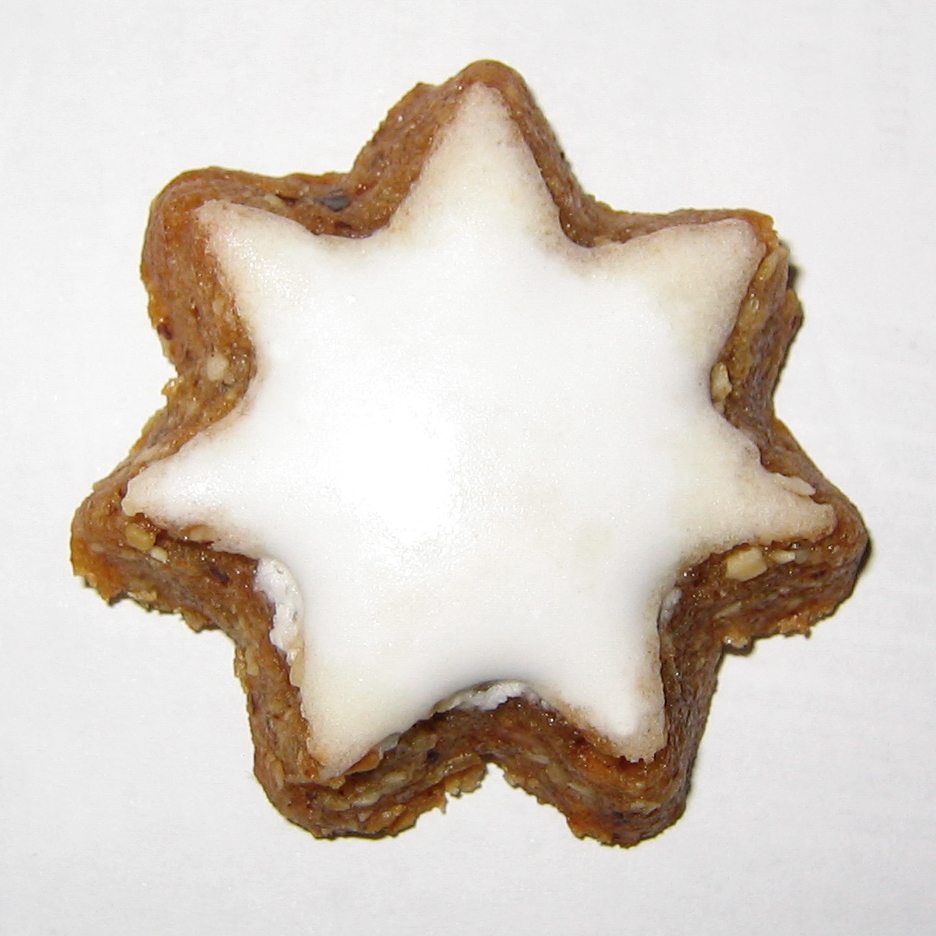
A classical Zimtstern

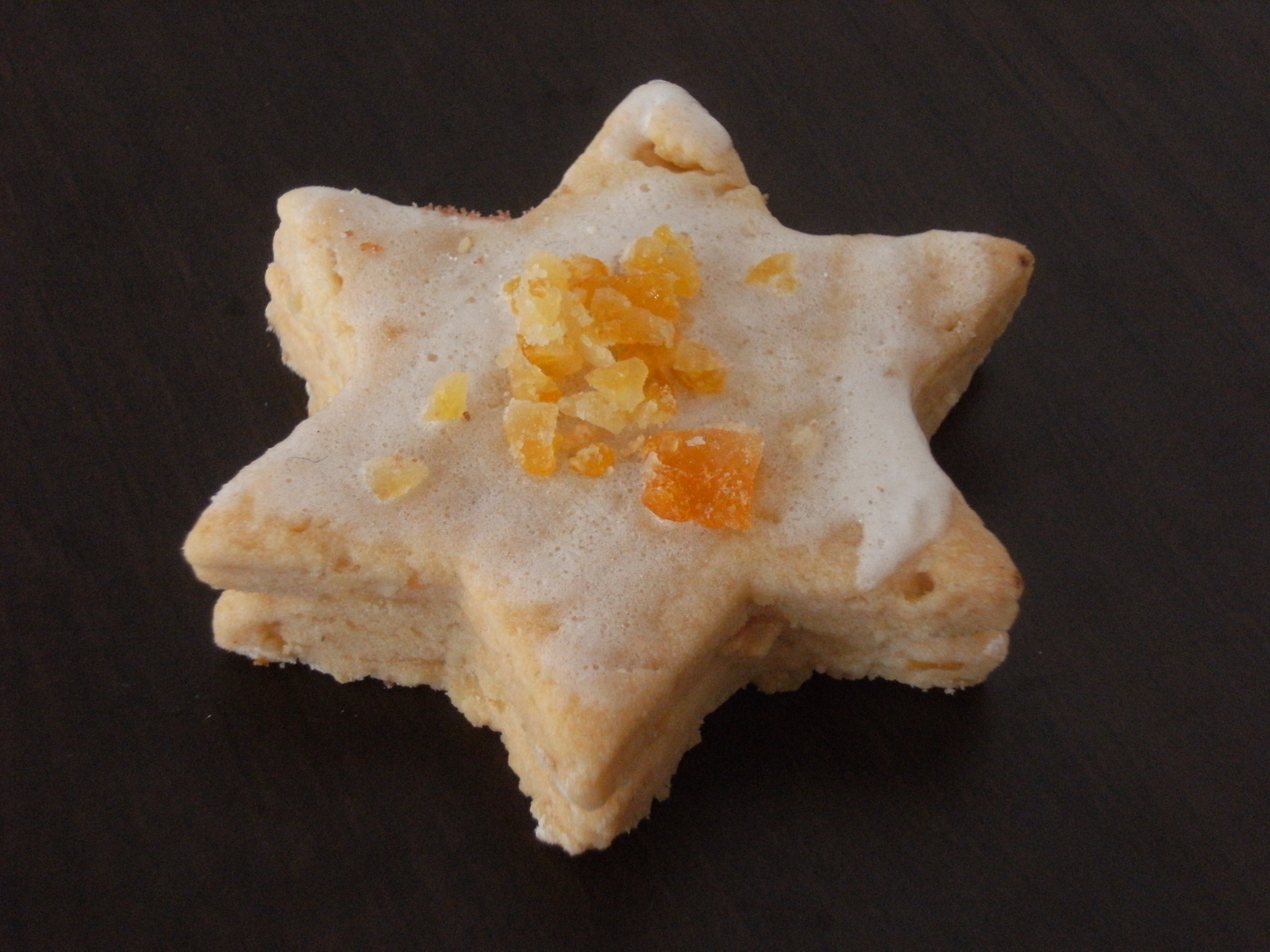
Orangenstern, a cinnamon star with orange zest in the middle

A Zimtstern (German pronunciation: [ˈt͜sɪmtˌʃtɛʁn], lit. 'cinnamon star'; pl.: Zimtsterne) is a Christmas cookie, originally from Swabia in Southwest Germany, made from foam of whipped egg white, sugar, at least 25% almonds, cinnamon and a maximum of 10% flour. It is most popular in Germany, Switzerland, and Alsace.

Cookies of this kind are called Plätzchen or Weihnachtsgebäck ('Christmas cookies') in German.

The ingredients are used to make a compact dough that is easy to roll out. After drying, an egg white glaze is applied and the stars are cut out. These are baked on baking trays over low heat, whereby the egg white glaze only coagulates and does not take on any darker color.

According to old cookbooks, the egg white is whipped to loosen it and lifted under the dough. The egg white and sugar (meringue) glaze is also whipped. This procedure is no longer in widespread use today.

Although most varieties of Plätzchen appeared in the 19th century to decorate the Christmas tree, cinnamon stars were not originally associated with Christmas and date back to the 16th century at the latest. There are mentions that in 1536 the Emperor of Holy Roman Emperor Charles V was served "delicious" cinnamon stars when visiting Cardinal Lorenzo Campeggio. Cinnamon in those days was an extremely expensive spice: in 1530 the Augsburg merchant Anton Fugger decided to demonstrate his wealth to the emperor by burning Charles V's promissory notes on a fire made of cinnamon sticks.
