= Shared lives =

UK form of support and accommodation for adults

Shared Lives, which is also known as Adult Placement in some areas, is a UK form of support and accommodation for adults with need wherein approved individuals or families open their lives to aid older or disabled persons.

Over 10,000 Shared Lives carers in the UK provided care to people with a wide range of disabilities, illnesses and support needs, including people with learning disabilities, people with mental health problems, older people, care leavers (government wards aging out of care), disabled children becoming young adults, parents with learning disabilities and their children, and ex-offenders. Shared Lives carers are recruited, trained, approved, monitored and paid by one of the UK's 150 regulated Shared Lives schemes.

The goal of Shared Lives is to match the individuals in need of service with others who will be compatible to them to act as 'extended family'. While generally the individual in need of support will move into the home of the carer, sometimes service is provided in their own homes, as day support, as breaks for unpaid family carers, as home from hospital care and as a stepping stone for someone who wants to get their own place.

== Users ==
According to a Care Quality Commission report for 2009–2010, more than 10,788 people in England used Shared Lives. While the Care Quality Commission showed minor increases from the prior year, Information Centre statistics collated through different methodology showed a 36% increase in the same period. 13% of users were over 65, with the vast majority (76%) consisting of persons between 18 and 64 with learning disability. Mental health problems (7%) and physical disabilities (3%) were less represented.

Use of Shared Lives is also increasing in Wales, with a 30% rise to 303 households in 2008–2009, while use in Scotland doubled between 2006 and 2009.

== Regulation ==
Shared Lives Schemes in the UK are regulated under:

- the Health and Social Care Act 2008 [in England];
- the Adult Placement Scheme (Wales) Regulations 2004;
- the Regulation of Care (Scotland) Act 2001, superseded April 2011 by the Public Services Reform (Scotland) Act 2010 (Schedule 12);
- the Adult Placement Agencies Regulations (Northern Ireland) 2007.

== Shared Lives Plus ==
Shared Lives Plus, a charity based in Liverpool, is the UK network for family-based and small-scale ways of supporting adults to live independently and to contribute to their families and communities. Its members are Shared Lives carers and workers, Homeshare programmes and micro-enterprises, which include a range of very small community-based services that share adult placement values and ethos. Alex Fox is the chief executive.

NHS England announced the allocation of £1.75 million in 2016 to support to 6 to 10 Clinical commissioning groups to develop Shared Lives schemes which:

- Help to move people with learning disabilities out of medical institutions
- Offer live-in mental health support instead of hospital treatment
- Provide ‘step down’ services for people who have had health crises
- Support people with dementia

Shared Lives Plus supported this programme.

In 2016 the organisation merged with Homeshare UK and formed a partnership with Homeshare International. Lloyds Bank Foundation and Big Lottery Fund have each contributed £1 million in funding and evaluating local Homeshare pilots.
