= Homeshare =

Homeshare (also called sharehome) is the exchange of housing for help in the home. A householder, typically an aged person with a spare room, offers free or low-cost accommodation to another person in exchange for an agreed level of support. The support may include companionship, shopping, household tasks, gardening, care of pets and, increasingly, help to use the computer. Homeshare thus provides a solution to the needs of two groups of people - those in need of affordable housing, often younger people, and those in need of some support to live at home, usually older people.

Homeshare programs are operated by a diverse range of organizations, including voluntary bodies and publicly funded initiatives, across numerous countries. In addition to these, for-profit entities, such as Home Sweet Homeshare, have emerged to provide homeshare matching and support services. This diversification of providers reflects the growing recognition of homeshare as a viable housing and support solution.

== Who benefits from homeshare and how? ==
Homeshare was originally set up to benefit older people who needed support to live independently, but the concept is flexible and can be adapted to meet local needs and circumstances. For instance, services like Home Sweet Homeshare focus on connecting older homeowners with younger working professionals in "community caring" occupations such as teachers, nurses, and social workers who earn under $100,000 annually.

Homeshare is directly benefiting many people across the globe, including:

- People with disabilities or support needs, of all ages
- single parents who need help with child care
- Students who need low-cost accommodation
- Young people and key workers (such as nurses, police officers, teachers) who are priced out of the housing market
- Students from overseas, living with a host offers the chance to improve their English language skills.

The direct benefits to a Householder include; help with daily living, companionship and the security of having someone in the house, especially at night. There are even recorded instances of homesharers saving lives; for example a German homesharer called the emergency services when the householder had a heart attack. Other benefits include: breaking down the barriers between generations and different cultures, fostering mutual understanding and tolerance. For instance, in an Australian program, an elderly Italian lady successfully shared her home with a Pakistani Muslim homesharer.

Others benefit indirectly. Families of Householders speak of the reassurance that their loved one has someone in the house, looking out for their welfare. Public services benefit too, as homeshare can delay the need for costly services such as residential care.

The following case study from the UK indicates how homeshare can benefit an older and a younger person.

Josie, in her mid-70s, was referred to a homeshare programme by a hospital after a stroke severely affected her behaviour. The hospital was keen to discharge her if home support could be arranged. She was found a perfect match in Trevor, a young working man who needed accommodation and who handled Josie’s erratic ways with great diplomacy. Soon Josie adored him like a grandson and, keen to cook for him, regained all her independence skills. Trevor stayed with her for three years by which time Josie was well enough to live alone again.

== How homeshare works ==
Homeshare programs vary in their operational models. Many operate using a ‘counselling’ model, involving comprehensive screening, facilitated matching, contract negotiation, and ongoing support. This ‘match-up’ approach, prevalent in the USA, is also utilized by modern for-profit services such as Home Sweet Homeshare, which employs online platforms and matching algorithms to streamline the process. Other programs utilize a ‘referral’ model, where coordinators provide initial introductions, leaving the final arrangement to the participants. Some programs, like Cohabilis or ensemble2generations in France, involve a modest rental payment from the homesharer.

Homeshare is usually seen as a free exchange of services, though in some programmes, such as Cohabilis or ensemble2generations in France, Homesharers pay a modest rent for their room. Typically, the Homesharers get free accommodation, however, and in return offer a specified number of hours of support: ten hours per week in the UK is usual. In contrast, in Germany, the hours of support are related to the size of the Homesharer's room. Either or both applicants may pay a fee to the Homeshare program to cover administrative, marketing, and monitoring costs.

== The history of homeshare ==
Homeshare has its roots in the USA where the late Maggie Kuhn (founder of the Gray Panthers) set up the first programs in 1972. In the UK, homeshare was taken up in the early 1980s by the late Nan Maitland, who in 1993 launched the first formal programme, in London. In Europe, it is believed that the concept of homeshare was invented quite independently in Spain, where, in 1991 the Alojamiento por Compañia programme was set up in Granada to meet an urgent need for student accommodation. By 1992 the idea had been adopted in Germany where the award-winning Wohnen für Hilfe programme was founded by Professor Anne-Lotte Kreickemeier in Darmstadt, again to meet the need for student accommodation. There are now several programmes in Germany. In France, ensemble2generations, founded in 2006 in the Paris area, is now spreading to other parts of the country.

In 1999 Nan Maitland went on to launch Homeshare International (HI). Homeshare programmes in Sydney and Melbourne, Australia, were launched in 2000 as a direct result of Homeshare International's work.

The concept has now been adopted in many parts of the world. There have been failures too – in Israel and the Czech Republic in the 1990s for example.

== Homeshare and the public policy agenda ==
Homeshare fits well with the policy agendas of many different countries, where it:

- supports older people in their own homes for longer, delaying or preventing the need for costly residential care (see for example the Ben Carstein (2003) evaluation, detailed below)
- enables hospital discharge and prevents ‘bed-blocking’
- is a simple solution: "The consistency and simplicity of a single homesharer is ‘heaven sent’ compared with the typical highly-complex package of care for older people" (quoted from the report by Patricia Thornton, see below)
- makes better use of housing stock – many older householders are ‘under-occupying’ their homes
- provides affordable housing for key workers in expensive cities like London, UK
- provides low-cost accommodation for students, primarily in mainland Europe, where universities have increased their intake faster than their student housing programmes
- tackles loneliness by facilitating sociable living
- could contribute to intergenerational programmes, for examples see the Beth Johnson Foundation website
- contributes to strengthening local communities, such as promoted under the UK's Putting People First agenda

Despite the fact that homeshare meets so many policy aims, public authorities have been slow to adopt it. Some programmes are funded by government, for example, in Australia, but others struggle with little or no public financial backing. In part this may be due to policy makers’ lack of awareness, but another factor may be the perceived risk of homeshare. In the UK for example, policy makers are wary of enabling strangers to move in with vulnerable older people, even though there is no single documented case of abuse taking place. The cost of running homeshare programmes may be another factor that limits the spread of the idea, though there is ample evidence that homeshare can be very cost-effective in meeting the needs of older people (see Carstein (2003), below).

Private sector initiatives, such as Home Sweet Homeshare, are addressing gaps in service provision by offering structured matching and support. These for-profit entities work to supplement the work done by non-profit and government programs. These private sector businesses are working to solve the housing crisis and the loneliness crisis. Further research is needed to understand the long-term effects of private homeshare businesses.

== Homeshare International and other umbrella organizations ==
Homeshare International was set up in 1999 to:

- raise awareness of homeshare and its potential contribution to public policy
- foster new programmes round the world
- encourage and support ‘good practices’
- encourage practitioners to exchange learning, ideas and information
- stimulate research into the benefits of homeshare
- provide working tools for homeshare practitioners

Run entirely by volunteers, Homeshare International runs a multi-lingual website, which is a major resource for practitioners, publishes a directory of known programmes (also on the website) and runs biennial conferences to enable people to meet and share experiences and learning.

In the UK, Homeshare UK (part of Shared Lives Plus, formerly NAAPS (National Association of Adult Placement Services)) supports the promotion and development of Homeshare schemes in the UK and ROI What is Homeshare?, with a membership of the 23 Homeshare programmes. In the US, many homeshare programmes are affiliated with the National Shared Housing Resource Center.
