= Brandy snaps =

British snack

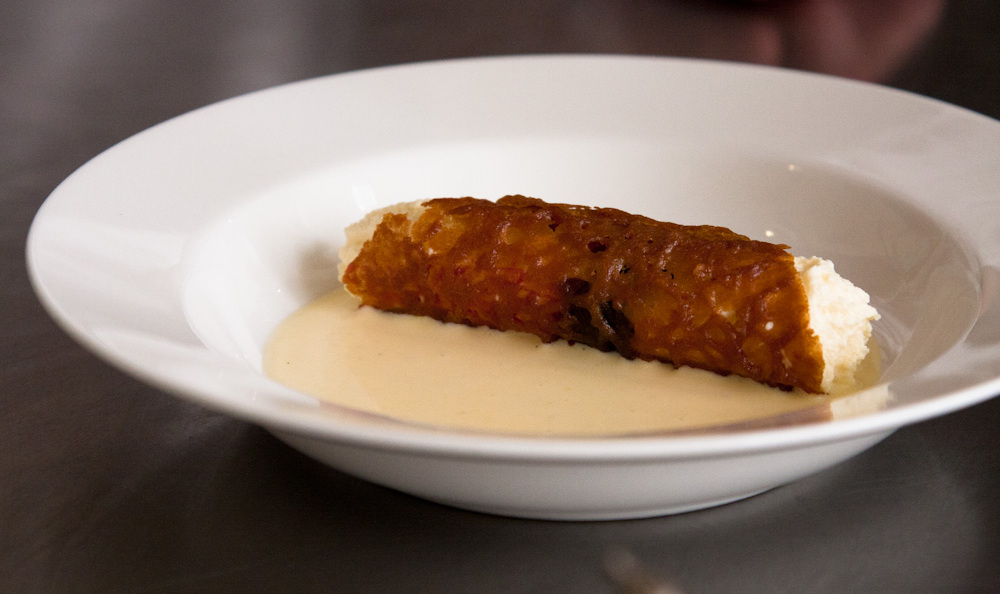
- Damson jelly and brandy snaps filled with goat’s milk ricotta
- Place of origin: United Kingdom
- Main ingredients: golden syrup; flour; ginger; cream; sugar; butter
- Variations: Brandy baskets

Brandy snaps are a popular snack or dessert food in the United Kingdom, Ireland, Australia and New Zealand, similar to the Italian cannoli. They are often tubular, brittle, sweet, baked casings that are typically 10 centimetres (4 in) long and 2 centimetres (1 in) in diameter. Brandy snaps are customarily served filled with whipped cream.

They are commonly made from butter, sugar, golden syrup, flour, ginger, and lemon, then baked flat and rolled while still warm; they may be served filled with whipped cream. The whipped cream can be sweetened with brandy or vanilla. However, the name brandy snap has no reference to brandy, the spirit, the name being related to "branded" (as in burnt).

== History ==
An early Victorian etymology for brandy snaps is "brand-schnap, from being burnt, not for the real or supposed presence of brandy".

The brandy snap is a popular sweet snack sold at the annual Hull Fair, held every October. The product sold at the fair has traditionally been made by Wright and Co. at its Bridge End Works in Brighouse, West Yorkshire.
