= Finalists of The Great British Bake Off (series 8–present) =

The Great British Bake Off is a British television baking competition, produced by Love Productions. It premiered on BBC Two in 2010, then moved to BBC One in 2014, and then moved to Channel 4 in 2017. This list contains sections about annual winners and runners-up who appeared from series eight onward, which aired on Channel 4.

The information seen in tables, including age and occupation, are based on the time of filming.

== Series 8 (2017) ==
Finalists of series eight (2017)
Baker	Age (on show debut)	Occupation	Hometown	Star Baker (count and weeks)	Result
Sophie Faldo	33	Former army officer and trainee stuntwoman	West Molesey, Surrey	2 (5th and 9th)	Winner
Steven Carter-Bailey	34	Marketer	Watford, Hertfordshire	3 (1st, 2nd and 7th)	Runner-up
Kate Lyon	29	Health and safety inspector	Merseyside	1 (4th)	Runner-up

=== Sophie Faldo (winner) ===
Sophie Faldo is a former British Army officer who was the winner of the eighth series in 2017, the first series to be broadcast on Channel 4.

Faldo was born in London and grew up in Suffolk. She studied psychology at the University of Manchester and Toulouse. She joined the Royal Artillery and has served in Afghanistan. After leaving the Army, she worked as a personal trainer, taught military boot camps, and was training to be a stuntwoman when she was convinced by her chef boyfriend to apply for The Great British Bake Off.

Faldo won the competition. Twelve hours before the final episode, judge Prue Leith accidentally tweeted the results.

Faldo appeared in an episode of a TV series Travels with a Goat on Insight TV, travelling to southern Kenya with Spanish food vlogger Abraham Bandera Baez.

Faldo rowed to a high standard, and was part of the Molesey Boat Club eight that won bronze at the 2011 British Rowing Championships.

=== Steven Carter-Bailey ===
Steven Carter-Bailey (born 1982/83), one of the runners-up of the eighth series, was a marketer from Watford, Hertfordshire, at the time of the competition.

Carter-Bailey re-competed against Tamal Ray (series six), Candice Brown (series seven, winner), and Kate Henry (series five) for the 2018–19 New Year's special. He was crowned the special's winner.

Since Bake Off, Carter-Bailey worked for ITV London covering London bakeries and released his first podcast, Feed My Curiosity, in 2021.

=== Kate Lyon ===
Kate Lyon (born 1987/88), one of the runners-up of the eighth series, was a health and safety inspector from Merseyside at the time of the competition. As of September 2020, she studied for a master's degree in occupational health and safety.

== Series 9 (2018) ==
Finalists of series nine (2018)
Baker	Age (on show debut)	Occupation	Hometown	Star Baker (count & weeks)	Result
Rahul Mandal	30	Research scientist	Rotherham	2 (2nd and 3rd)	Winner
Ruby Bhogal	29	Project manager	London	2 (8th and 9th)	Runner-up
Kim-Joy Hewlett	27	Mental health specialist	Leeds	2 (5th and 7th)	Runner-up

One of contestants this series was absent on the fourth week, leading the judges to decide not to eliminate anyone in that person's absence.

=== Rahul Mandal (winner) ===
Rahul Mandal (born 1987) is an Indian baker and engineering researcher, who won the ninth series in 2018. Mandal also works as an engineering researcher at the University of Sheffield's Nuclear Advanced Manufacturing Research Centre.

Mandal is an only child. Born in Howrah, India, his mother was a housewife and his father runs a business supplying engineering parts across India. Rahul graduated from the West Bengal University of Technology with a Bachelor's degree in electronics and communication engineering and then from the University of Calcutta with a master's degree in optics and optoelectronics. He came to the United Kingdom in 2010 on a scholarship to study for his PhD in Optical Metrology at Loughborough University and his thesis was on Calibration and Adjustment of Coherence Scanning Interferometry. He joined the Nuclear AMRC in 2015.

In 2018, Mandal won the ninth series, whose finals was viewed by 10 million households. He was then signed as a columnist for The Times Magazine, a part of the Saturday supplement of The Times, and occasionally cooks on the ITV daytime show This Morning. In 2018, Mandal became a self-declared STEM ambassador.

Mandal married his fiancée in Kolkata, India, on 5 December 2022.

=== Ruby Bhogal ===
Ruby Bhogal (born 1988), one of runners-up of the ninth series, is a project manager in London. Bhogal has written columns for GQ, The Luxury Lifestyle Magazine and GoodHomes. She re-competed for the 2020 Bake Off Christmas special against eliminated non-finalists Jamie Finn (series ten), Rosie Brandreth-Poynter (series ten), and James Hillery (series eight). She also made guest appearances on This Morning and Steph's Packed Lunch.

=== Kim-Joy ===
Kim-Joy Hewlett (born 1991), one of runners-up of the ninth series, was a psychological wellbeing practitioner at the time of the competition. She has since released three cookbooks and written a baking column for The Guardian. She returned for The Great New Year Bake Off special, aired on 1 January 2022, against Jon Jenkins (series nine) and two other contestants of the eleventh series—Hermine and Rowan Williams. Kim-Joy was crowned its winner.

== Series 10 (2019) ==
Finalists of series ten (2019)
Baker	Age (on show debut)	Occupation	Hometown	Star Baker (count and weeks)	Result
David Atherton	36	International health adviser	Whitby	None	Winner
Steph Blackwell	28	Shop assistant	Chester	4 (4th–6th, 8th)	Runner-up
Alice Fevronia	28	Geography teacher	Essex	2 (2nd and 9th)	Runner-up

=== David Atherton (winner) ===
David Atherton was born in Whitby, North Yorkshire in 1983 and lived in the village of Ruswarp until he was 18. He has four siblings. He studied art and design before deciding on a career in healthcare and training as a nurse. He has a post-graduate degree in wilderness and expedition medicine, and works as a health adviser for Voluntary Service Overseas. Atherton followed in the footsteps of his mother who volunteered for VSO in Papua New Guinea in the 1970s. Atherton has worked in various countries around the world, such as Ivory Coast, Ethiopia, Papua New Guinea and Nigeria, including a stint as a clinical instructor in Malawi.

Atherton took part in the tenth series of The Great British Bake Off, encouraged by friends in his pottery class. He was crowned the winner.

Atherton started writing a cookery column for The Guardian in 2020 on food for fitness. His first book, titled My First Cookbook, is a children's cookbook published by Walker books in August 2020. In 2021, he published two additional follow-up versions for young cooks: My First Green Cookbook and Bake, Make, and Learn to Cook. In May 2021, he published Good to Eat, which focuses on delivering healthy twists to classic recipes.

David lives in South London with his partner Nik Sariyski, who is a visual merchandising manager at Nike. He came out as gay at age 29.

=== Steph Blackwell ===
Steph Blackwell (born 21 January 1991), one of the runners-up of the tenth series, was a shop assistant at the time of the competition. Blackwell was awarded Star Baker four times. She has baked "simple and traditional" recipes.

=== Alice Fevronia ===
Alice Fevronia (born 1990/91), one of runners-up of the tenth series, was a geography teacher from London at the time of the competition. She has written column articles for the Delish website.

== Series 11 (2020) ==
Finalists of series eleven (2020)
Baker	Age (on show debut)	Occupation	Hometown	Star Baker (count and weeks)	Result
Peter Sawkins	20	Accounting and finance student	Edinburgh	2 (1st and 9th)	Winner
Dave Friday	30	Armoured security guard	Waterlooville, Hampshire	1 (2nd)	Runner-up
Laura Adlington	31	Digital manager	Gravesend, Kent	1 (5th)	Runner-up

=== Peter Sawkins (winner) ===
Peter Sawkins (born 30 June 2000) is a Scottish baker and student from Currie, Edinburgh. He won the eleventh series in 2020, which was filmed under special circumstances due to the COVID-19 pandemic. He won the title of Star Baker twice on the show and is known for his gluten-free fancies. He was the youngest contestant in the 2020 series, as well as the youngest winner and youngest finalist in the history of the competition.

Sawkins first became interested in baking at the age of 12 after watching the third series. He plays badminton, and has played in national competitions in the sport since 2012. He was a member of the 65th Edinburgh company of the Boys' Brigade. He was also president of the badminton club at the University of Edinburgh, where he studied accounting and finance. In 2023, Peter graduated from the University with a degree in accountancy and finance and was subsequently elected President of the Edinburgh University Sports Union (EUSU) for a one-year term.

He wrote the cookbooks Peter Bakes (2021) and Peter's Baking Party (2022).

=== Laura Adlington ===
Laura Adlington (born 28 November 1988), one of runners-up of the eleventh series, was a digital manager at the time of the competition. Due to her bakes throughout the series judged as often flavourful but poorly constructed and presented, her placement in the finals was widely criticised by viewers. Laura suffered from cyberbullying via social media. Judges Paul Hollywood and Prue Leith expressed support for Adlington. Via Instagram, Hollywood criticised the cyberbullying as "disgusting behaviour".

In May 2021, Adlington announced her extended interests in plus-size clothing, planning to show that such clothing is more than just "black and baggy" but rather "glamorous" and "nice".

=== Dave Friday ===
Dave Friday (born 1989/90), one of runners-up of the eleventh series, was a security guard at the time of the competition. Dave has a son born in 2020 to his fiancée, to whom he proposed in that same year in An Extra Slice.

== Series 12 (2021) ==
Finalists of series twelve (2021)
Baker	Age (on show debut)	Occupation	Hometown	Star Baker (count and weeks)	Result
Giuseppe Dell'Anno	45	Chief engineer	Bristol	2 (3rd and 5th)	Winner
Chigs Parmar	40	Sales manager	Leicester	2 (4th and 8th)	Runner-up
Crystelle Pereira	26	Client relationship manager	London	2 (6th and 9th)	Runner-up

=== Giuseppe Dell'Anno (winner) ===
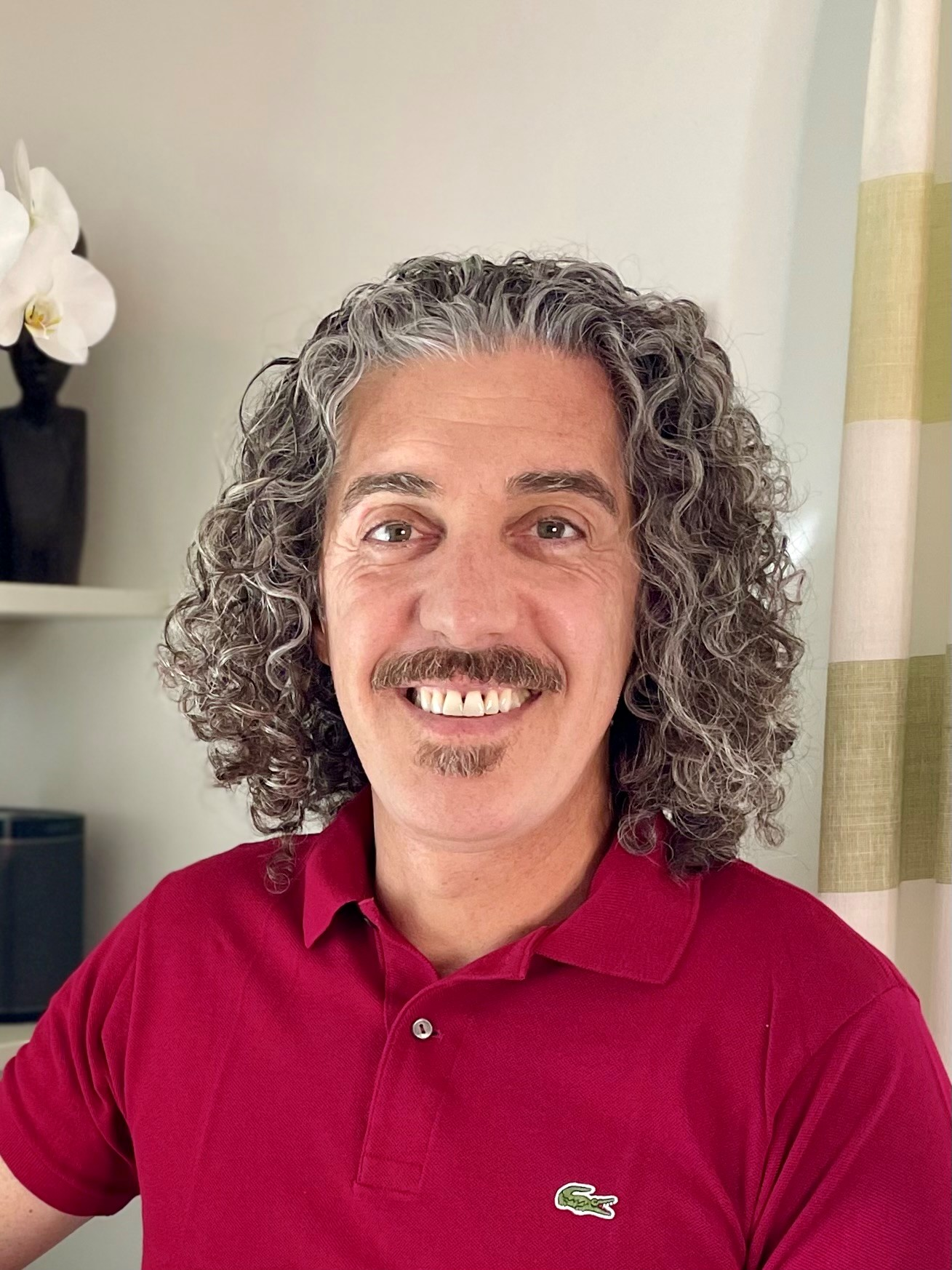

Giuseppe Dell'Anno (born 1976), the winner of the twelfth series, was a chief engineer from Bristol and an industrial fellow of the University of Bristol at the time of the competition. He studied chemical engineering in the University of Pisa. He and his wife moved to the United Kingdom in 2002 and have lived there since.

Dell'Anno won Star Baker twice. Throughout the competition, his bakes were Italian-inspired. He became the first Italian to win the competition after presenting his Mad Hatter's Tea Party Showstopper, "What Is the Hatter with Me", featuring a brioche resembling a mushroom, panna cottas, heart-shaped muffins, and an asparagus and peas caterpillar-shaped choux. He also made a guest appearance on the fifth episode of the 2022 season of Bake Off Italia. From that same year 2022 onward, he also wrote his regular column "Britalian Bake-Off Review" column for the Radio Times, recapping episodes of Bake Off.

Dell'Anno's father was a professional chef and has been diagnosed with Alzheimer's disease. Giuseppe is still married to his wife with three sons.

Giuseppe has written the following cookbooks: Giuseppe's Italian Bakes (2022), which includes recipes based on his father's lifetime notes; and Giuseppe's Easy Bakes (2023).

=== Chigs Parmar ===
Will Chirag Parmar (born 1980/81), nicknamed "Chigs", one of runners-up of the twelfth series, was a sales manager from Leicestershire at the time of the competition. Parmar started baking in 2020 during the COVID-19 pandemic. He won Star Baker twice. He has one sister.

Parmar returned for the 2023 Bake Off New Year special, competing against Lottie Bedlow (series eleven) and two other contestants of series nine—Antony Amourdoux and Manon Lagrève. Parmar lost to its winner Lagrève.

=== Crystelle Pereira ===
Crystelle Pereira (born 1995), one of runners-up of the twelfth series, was a client relationship manager from London at the time of the competition. Pereira is of a Portuguese and Goan descent. Her Portuguese-Goan parents were born in Kenya. She won Star Baker twice.

== Series 13 (2022) ==
Finalists of series thirteen (2022)
Baker	Age (on show debut)	Occupation	Hometown	Star Baker (count and weeks)	Result
Syabira Yusoff	32	Cardiovascular research associate	London	3 (6th–8th)	Winner
Nelsandro "Sandro" Farmhouse	30	Nanny	London	1 (5th)	Runner-up
Abdul Rehman Sharif	29	Electronics engineer	London	1 (9th)	Runner-up

Abdul and another contestant this series was absent on the third week, leading the judges to decide not to eliminate anyone in their absence.

=== Syabira Yusoff (winner) ===
Syabira Yusoff was a London cardiovascular research associate of King's College London since 2019 at the time of competition. Yusoff was born in Malaysia, where she earned her bachelor's degree in agricultural science. Then she immigrated to the United Kingdom in 2013 to study genetics and bioinformatics for her Doctor of Philosophy (PhD) degree.

Yusoff started baking in 2017 and has reinvented British classic bakes with Malaysian flavours. She won the Star Baker award three consecutive times in the thirteenth series. Yusoff was crowned the 2022 winner and became the first Malaysian-born Bake Off winner after delivering her own "Summer Picnic" signature bake—pork-less pie alternative, heart-shaped tea sandwiches served "with broad bean and sauce verde", and Swiss rolls infused with elderflower—and her planet-themed Showstopper bake "This Is My Home".

=== Sandro Farmhouse ===
Nelsandro "Sandro" Farmhouse, one of runners-up of the thirteenth series, was a London nanny at the time of competition. Farmhouse was born in Angola. At age two, he and his mother escaped from the Angolan Civil War in early 1990s. His interest in baking rose after his father died in early 2010s when Farmhouse was twenty-one years old. He has run virtual baking lessons for autistic children. He only won the Star Baker award once: in the fifth (Desserts) week of the thirteenth series.

=== Abdul Rehman Sharif ===
Abdul Rehman Sharif, one of runners-up of the thirteenth series, was a London electronics engineer at the time of competition. Born to his Pakistani parents, Sharif grew up in Saudi Arabia. He gained an interest in baking when he and his graduate colleagues exchanged their bakes during their coffee breaks. He studied engineering and mathematics during his academic years and later applied what he learned to his bakes. He won the Star Baker award only in the semifinal (Pâtisserie) week of the thirteenth series.

== Series 14 (2023) ==
Finalists of series fourteen (2023)
Baker	Age (on show debut)	Occupation	Hometown	Star Baker (count and weeks)	Result
Matty Edgell	28	Teacher	Cambridgeshire	2 (4th and 8th)	Winner
Dan Hunter	42	Resource planner	Cheshire	2 (1st and 7th)	Runner-up
Josh Smalley	27	Research associate	Leicestershire	2 (6th and 9th)	Runner-up

=== Matty Edgell (winner) ===
Matty Edgell was a 28-year-old science and physical education teacher of Hampton College, Peterborough, when first competed in Bake Off. His partner Lara applied to the competition on his behalf after he won a school baking contest in 2019. He was crowned winner of the fourteenth series of Bake Off.

Edgell and Lara became engaged in 2022 after eight years of the relationship.

=== Dan Hunter ===
Dan Hunter, a married father of two sons, works in a civil engineering field and was one of runners-up of the fourteenth Bake Off series at age 42.

=== Josh Smalley ===
Josh Smalley, a University of Leicester alumni and chemistry researcher, was one of runners-up of the fourteenth series who was awarded Star Baker twice. Smalley earned his undergraduate degree, Master of Chemistry degree in pharmaceutical chemistry, and PhD degree in chemical biology from the same university.

== Series 15 (2024) ==
Finalists of series fifteen (2024)
Baker	Age (on show debut)	Occupation	Hometown	Star Baker (count and weeks)	Result
Georgie Grasso	34	Paediatric nurse	Carmarthenshire	2 (4th and 8th)	Winner
Christiaan de Vries	33	Menswear designer	London (originally from the Netherlands)	1 (9th)	Runner-up
Dylan Bachelet	20	Retail assistant	Buckinghamshire	2 (3rd and 7th)	Runner-up

=== Georgie Grasso (winner) ===
Georgie Grasso, aged 34 at time of competition, is a nurse from Carmarthen and of Italian descent. She lives on a farm with her husband their three children. She is revealed to have been diagnosed with attention deficit hyperactivity disorder (ADHD) before the fifteenth series aired. Grasso became the series's crowned winner and was also The Great British Bake Off's first Welsh winner.

=== Christiaan de Vries ===
Christiaan de Vries, aged 33 at the time of competition, was born in the Netherlands. He studied fashion in Amsterdam and then immigrated to the United Kingdom in 2017. de Vries became one of the runners-up of the fifteenth series.

=== Dylan Bachelet ===
Dylan Bachelet, aged 20 at time of competition, worked as a retail assistant. He became one of the runners-up of the fifteenth series. Bachelet's recipes, includings ones seen in the series, have been inspired by Japanese- and French-style bakes. After Bake Off, he became a chef de partie at the Michelin-starred Five Fields in Chelsea, London. Five Fields eventually closed permanently on 28 February 2025.

Born to his Indian mother and Japanese-Belgian father, Bachelet attended Sir Henry Floyd Grammar School. He achieved four A's at A-level and started a degree in biomedical engineering before dropping out to pursue a culinary career. Bachelet trained at Raymond Blanc's two Michelin starred Le Manoir in Oxfordshire.

== Series 16 (2025) ==
Finalists of series sixteen (2025)
Baker	Age (on show debut)	Occupation	Hometown	Star Baker (count and weeks)	Result
Jasmine Mitchell	23	Medical student	Edinburgh	5 (3rd–4th, 6th, 8th–9th)	Winner
Aaron Mountford-Myles	38	Senior systems architect	Stoke-on-Trent	1 (5th)	Runner-up
Tom Arden	31	Creative Entrepreneur	London	1 (2nd)	Runner-up

=== Jasmine Mitchell (winner) ===
Jasmine Mitchell was a 23-year-old medical student on her fifth year out of six at the time of competition. With alopecia diagnosis since age twelve, she had been unable to leave home without a wig. She was unable to wear it at her trip to Vietnam years ago due to the country's "humid" climate. Much to her astonishment, the locals were more accepting to her without a wig, so she has not worn it since 2022, three years before Bake Off.

Before Bake Off, Mitchell had cooked a lot more than baking. Furthermore, she describe her admittance to Bake Off as "spontaneous" because she became interested in baking after attending a lecture using Bake Off examples. She applied one year prior to being cast to prevent her friend from doing so on her behalf. Throughout the sixteenth series, she had used her problem-solving skills from her medical experience for her bakes, relied "on God's strength" rather than solely her own, and been able to organise "under pressure". She earned her first Star Baker title on the third week of the series. She further won Star Baker four more times—totalling to five, tying with Richard Burr of the fifth series—and then was crowned the winner of the sixteenth series. In the finale, the judges praised her Signature and Showstopper bakes.

Since winning Bake Off, Mitchell baked three more times but still has been still passionate more about cooking and has perceived food to be "about connection and community." Furthermore, she planned to finish medical school and to "become a doctor" but thought about writing a cookbook and further television appearances.

=== Aaron Mountford-Myles ===
Aaron Mountford-Myles, an information technology professional at the time of competition, became one of runners-up of the sixteenth series. In the finale, the judges criticised his Showstopper bake for not only its lackluster flavour but also being over-baked. After Bake Off, he admitted to BBC Radio Stoke that he has hated making cakes, despite such requests, but still likes baking. He is studying analytics for his master's degree. He further described his time in Bake Off as the "best thing" he did.

=== Tom Arden ===
Thomas Arden became one of runners-up of the sixteenth series. In the finale, Tom Arden accidentally used citric acid instead of salt for his Signature bake, affecting its edibility. His final Showstopper bake was praised for its presentation and taste.

== Series 17 (2026) ==
Finalists of series seventeen (2026)
Baker	Age (on show debut)	Occupation	Hometown	Star Baker (count and weeks)	Result

== See also ==
- List of The Great British Bake Off contestants
