= The Great British Bake Off series 11 =

Eleventh series of The Great British Bake Off

The Great British Bake Off
- Series 11
- Presented by: Noel Fielding; Matt Lucas
- Judges: Paul Hollywood; Prue Leith
- No. of contestants: 12
- Winner: Peter Sawkins
- Runners-up: Dave Friday; Laura Adlington
- Location: Down Hall Hotel, near Bishop's Stortford
- No. of max. bakes: 30
- No. of episodes: 10

Release
- Original network: Channel 4
- Original release: 22 September – 24 November 2020

Series chronology
- ← Previous; Series 10 Next → Series 12

The eleventh series of The Great British Bake Off began on 22 September 2020. It was presented by returning host Noel Fielding and new host Matt Lucas, who replaced Sandi Toksvig, and was judged by returning judges Paul Hollywood and Prue Leith. The first three episodes were extended to 90 minutes instead of the usual 75 minutes. The bakers were announced on 15 September 2020.

Filming of the eleventh series was delayed by the COVID-19 pandemic; originally scheduled to take place in April 2020, it was pushed back to July 2020. Filming the series normally takes place over 12 or 13 weeks on the weekends, but due to the pandemic, the cast and crew had to live in a "self-contained biosphere" (Down Hall Hotel near Bishop's Stortford with a skeleton staff), and filming took place in a marquee tent in the garden of the hotel over a period of six weeks. The contestants and crew had to undergo a period of self-isolation after filming had ended.

The series was won by Peter Sawkins, with Dave Friday and Laura Adlington finishing as the runners-up. Sawkins is the first Scottish winner of the programme, and also the youngest winner in the show's 10-year history, at the age of 20.

Series 11 was released on Netflix in the U.S. as Collection 8. It premiered on 25 September 2020, with each episode available three days after the UK air date.

== Bakers ==
Contestant	Age	Hometown	Occupation	Finish	Place
Loriea Campbell-Clarey	27	Durham, England	Diagnostic radiographer	Episode 1	12th
Makbul "Mak" Patel	51	Manchester, England	Accountant	Episode 2	11th
Rowan Williams	55	Pershore, England	Music teacher	Episode 3	10th
Sura Mitib	31	London, England	Hospital pharmacy dispenser	Episode 4	9th
Linda Rayfield	61	Bexhill-on-Sea, England	Retirement living team leader	Episode 5	8th
Mark Lutton	32	Portadown, Northern Ireland	Project manager	Episode 6	7th
Lottie Bedlow	31	West Sussex, England	Pantomime producer	Episode 7	6th
Marc Elliott	51	St Eval, England	Bronze resin sculptor	Episode 8	5th
Hermine Dossou	39	London, England	Accountant	Episode 9	4th
Dave Friday	30	Waterlooville, England	Armoured security guard	Episode 10	Runner-up
Laura Adlington	31	Gravesend, England	Digital manager	Episode 10	Runner-up
Peter Sawkins	20	Edinburgh, Scotland	Accounting & finance student	Episode 10	1st

== Results summary ==
Elimination chart
Baker	1	2	3	4	5	6	7	8	9	10
Peter	SB	SAFE	LOW	HIGH	HIGH	SAFE	SAFE	LOW	SB	WINNER
Dave	SAFE	SB	LOW	SAFE	HIGH	HIGH	SAFE	SAFE	HIGH	Runner-up
Laura	SAFE	SAFE	SAFE	SAFE	SB	LOW	LOW	HIGH	LOW	Runner-up
Hermine	HIGH	SAFE	SAFE	SAFE	HIGH	LOW	SB	SB	OUT	
Marc	LOW	HIGH	SB	SAFE	LOW	HIGH	HIGH	OUT		
Lottie	SAFE	SAFE	SAFE	LOW	SAFE	SB	OUT			
Mark	SAFE	HIGH	SAFE	SB	LOW	OUT				
Linda	LOW	SAFE	SAFE	SAFE	OUT					
Sura	HIGH	SAFE	HIGH	OUT						
Rowan	SAFE	LOW	OUT							
Mak	SAFE	OUT								
Loriea	OUT									

Colour key:

Baker was one of the judges' least favourite bakers that week, but was not eliminated.
Baker was one of the judges' favourite bakers that week, but was not the Star Baker.
Baker got through to the next round.
Baker was eliminated.
Baker was the Star Baker.
Baker was a series runner-up.
Baker was the series winner.

== Episodes ==
Colour key:

Baker was eliminated at conclusion of episode
Baker received a "Hollywood handshake" for respective bake
Baker was named "Star Baker" at conclusion of episode
Baker was named runner-up for the series
Baker won series

=== Episode 1: Cake ===
For the signature challenge, the bakers created an intricate Battenberg cake in 2 hours. The technical challenge set by Paul gave the bakers 90 minutes to bake 6 miniature pineapple upside-down cakes. At the end of the challenge, Sura, who saw a fly and was trying to brush it away, accidentally hit Dave's tray of six miniature cakes as he was setting them down, knocking four to the floor. Prue and Paul judged the better looking of the remaining two, assuming the rest were the same. In the showstopper challenge, the bakers created a 3-D cake bust depicting their personal celebrity hero in 4 hours.

Baker	Signature (Battenberg Cake)	Technical (6 Miniature Pineapple Upside-Down Cakes)	Showstopper (Celebrity Hero Cake Bust)	Result
Dave	Chocolate Espresso Martini Battenberg	9th	'Three Flavours of Tom DeLonge'	Safe
Hermine	Chocolate & Orange Battenberg	5th	'Ode to Lupita'	Safe
Laura	'Celebration of Summer' Battenberg	6th	Lemon & Elderflower Freddie	Safe
Linda	Ambulance Battenberg	12th	Lemon & Orange Bob Marley	Safe
Loriea	'Hot Summer's Day Treats' Battenberg	10th	'Flavours of Jamaica' A Tribute to Miss Lou	Eliminated
Lottie	Rhubarb and Custard Battenberg	4th	Coconut & Lime Louis Theroux	Safe
Mak	East India Battenberg	8th	Tribute to Bill Bryson	Safe
Marc	Bittersweet Battenberg	11th	Chocolate & Vanilla Ziggy	Safe
Mark	Turkish Bazaar Inspired Battenberg	7th	'Origin-ger of the Species' by Charles Darwin	Safe
Peter	Gluten Free Chocolate & Orange Battenberg	2nd	'In Honour of Sir Chris'	Star Baker
Rowan	'The Magic Flute' Battenberg	3rd	'Let Them Eat Cake' A Tribute To Marie Antoinette	Safe
Sura	Lemon and Orange Battenberg	1st	'Ode to Attenborough'	Safe

The broadcast of Episode 1 began at 8:15pm instead of 8:00pm, following Prime Minister Boris Johnson's address to the nation on the COVID-19 pandemic. The episode began with a parody of the Johnson address by new presenter Matt Lucas.

=== Episode 2: Biscuits ===
For the signature challenge, the bakers were tasked with making 36 identical chocolate florentines in 2 hours. The technical challenge, set by Prue, required the bakers to make 12 hand-shaped coconut macaroons, 6 piped with a mango curd and the other 6 drizzled and filled with chocolate, in 1 hour and 45 minutes. For the showstopper challenge, the bakers were given 4 hours to create a beautiful molded 3D biscuit table setting representing a memorable meal they had in the past.

Baker	Signature (36 Chocolate Florentines)	Technical (12 Hand-Shaped Coconut Macaroons)	Showstopper (3D Biscuit Table Setting)	Result
Dave	Feathered Chocolate Mango Florentines	1st	'Waiting for Tacos'	Star Baker
Hermine	Mango and Coconut Florentines	5th	Sakura Tea Set	Safe
Laura	Salted Caramel Florentines	7th	Celebration Afternoon Tea	Safe
Linda	Flower Topped Florentines	4th	'High Tea in Amsterdam'	Safe
Lottie	Quarantine Florentines	8th	Viking Victuals	Safe
Mak	Mango and Cumin Florentines	3rd	Indian Chai Service	Eliminated
Marc	Ginger, Cherry and Pistachio Florentines	9th	Morning Coffee 'n' Toast	Safe
Mark	Mango Lassi Florentines	2nd	Ethiopian Coffee Ceremony	Safe
Peter	Sticky Toffee Florentines	10th	Biscuit Burns Supper	Safe
Rowan	Waistcoat Florentines	11th	'Worse Things Happen At Sea'	Safe
Sura	Sohan Florentines	6th	Speculaas Ramadan Tea Time	Safe

=== Episode 3: Bread ===
The signature challenge tasked the bakers with making 2 freeform soda bread loaves, one savoury and one sweet, and an accompanying butter in 1 hour and 45 minutes. The technical challenge, set by Paul, tasked the bakers into making 6 rainbow-coloured bagels in honour of the NHS, in 2 hours and 45 minutes. For the showstopper challenge, the bakers were asked to create a large decorative bread plaque in the style of a traditional harvest festival sheaf, portraying the one thing in life they are most grateful for, in 3 hours and 30 minutes.

Baker	Signature (2 Soda Bread Loaves)	Technical (6 Rainbow-Coloured Bagels)	Showstopper (Large Bread Plaque)	Result
Dave	Chilli Chocolate & Cheesy Bacon Soda Breads	9th	'Grateful For My Home and Little Family'	Safe
Hermine	My Favourite Flavours Soda Bread	7th	A Journey Back to France	Safe
Laura	Nana Peg's Nicely Spiced & Cherrylicious Soda Breads	6th	Showstopping Musical Theatre Inspired Showstopper	Safe
Linda	Bara Cyflym Quick Bread	1st	'Fruits of our Labour' Black Olive Bread & Tiger Bread	Safe
Lottie	Blueberry Breakfast & Summertime Soda Breads	5th	My House In Bread	Safe
Marc	Cornish Soda Breads	2nd	The Dharma Wheel Bread Sheaf	Star Baker
Mark	Sausage & Stout Sodas	3rd	Orchard County Bread with Sweet Apple and Savoury Wild Garlic	Safe
Peter	Black Pudding & Ginger Beer Soda Breads	4th	Edinburgh Cityscape Bread Plaque	Safe
Rowan	Flavours of Italy	10th	Worcestershire Pear Tree	Eliminated
Sura	Middle Eastern Inspired Soda Breads	8th	Mama's Tomato Vine Harvest Loaf	Safe

=== Episode 4: Chocolate ===
The signature challenge was back to basics as the bakers were asked to make 18 chocolate brownies, in 1 hour and 30 minutes. For the technical, Paul tasked the bakers with making a traditional Jewish bake: chocolate babka, in 2 1/2 hours. In the showstopper challenge, the bakers were required to produce a spectacular two-tiered white chocolate celebration cake in 4 hours.

Baker	Signature (18 Chocolate Brownies)	Technical (Chocolate Babka)	Showstopper (White Chocolate Celebration Cake)	Result
Dave	Honeycomb Explosion Brownies	8th	Strawberry Splash White Chocolate Fraisier Cake	Safe
Hermine	Raspberry, White Chocolate & Pistachio Brownies	5th	Lemon & White Chocolate Cake	Safe
Laura	Salted Caramel Brownie S'mores	2nd	Chocolate Heaven Cake	Safe
Linda	'Treats of Christmas Past'	1st	English Rose Cake	Safe
Lottie	'Have Your Cake and Eat It' Brownies	9th	Nana and Papa's Sapphire Anniversary Cake	Safe
Marc	Praline Brownies	6th	White Chocolate & Raspberry Buttercream Celebration Cake	Safe
Mark	'Gimmie S'more' Brownies	3rd	'A Baking Show Birthday'	Star Baker
Peter	Upside Down Brownies	4th	Graduation Cake	Safe
Sura	Double Chocolate Marshmallow Brownies	7th	Strawberry & White Chocolate Celebration Cake	Eliminated

=== Episode 5: Pastry ===
For the signature, the bakers were tasked with putting their own spin on Cornwall's national dish: the pasty, in 2 hours. The technical challenge, set by Prue, required the bakers to make 6 éclairs—3 raspberry and 3 salted caramel—in 2 hours and 15 minutes. For the showstopper, the bakers were given the intricate task of making a sweet tart hidden under a latticed pastry cage, in 3 hours and 45 minutes.

Baker	Signature (8 Pasties)	Technical (6 Éclairs: 3 Raspberry & 3 Salted Caramel)	Showstopper (Caged Tart)	Result
Dave	Thai Basil Chicken Pasties	5th	Chocolate, Mango and Lime Tart	Safe
Hermine	Moroccan Tagine Pasties	2nd	Lime Confit & Lemon Meringue Tart	Safe
Laura	Proper Tasty Pasties	6th	Kent Garden Tart	Star Baker
Linda	Spicy Indian Pasties	8th	Gypsy Tart	Eliminated
Lottie	Toad-In-The-Hole-Less Pasties	4th	Apple Tree Tart	Safe
Marc	Cornish Fish Pasties	7th	Posh Apple & Blackberry Pie	Safe
Mark	Aloo Gobi & Paneer Pasties	3rd	Mes-SAGE in a Bottle	Safe
Peter	Kedgeree Pasties	1st	Blackberry & Lemon Tart	Safe

=== Episode 6: Japanese ===
Week Six was a Bake Off first as the bakers tackled Japanese week. The signature challenge tasked the bakers with making 8 steamed buns, complete with a savoury or sweet filling and decoration, in 2 hours and 30 minutes. For the technical challenge, Prue asked the bakers to make a matcha crepe cake, consisting of 12 layers of crepes sandwiched with a white chocolate ganache buttercream and strawberries, and decorated with fresh fruits and edible flowers on top, in 2 hours. The showstopper gave the bakers 4 hours to produce a cake inspired by the kawaii culture in Japan, incorporating Japanese flavours.

Baker	Signature (8 Steamed Buns)	Technical (Matcha Crepe Cake)	Showstopper (Kawaii Cake)	Result
Dave	Chicken Shaped Katsu Curry Buns	3rd	Matcha Shiba Inu Cake	Safe
Hermine	Chicken Nikuman Panda Buns	4th	Strawberry Cherry Blossom Cake	Safe
Laura	Piggy Pork Belly Buns	7th	Upside Down Pineapple Cake	Safe
Lottie	Cheeseburger Steamed Buns	2nd	'Into the Japanese Woods'	Star Baker
Marc	'Hmmmm Dhal' Steamed Buns	6th	Hamish the Dog Cake	Safe
Mark	Burger Buns	5th	'Avo Baby'	Eliminated
Peter	Lamb Steamed Buns	1st	Dizzy the Shuttlecock	Safe

This was the 100th episode of the Great British Bake Off throughout all seasons.

=== Episode 7: The '80s ===
For the signature challenge, the bakers were asked to perform their own twist on 8 classical quiches with 2 different savoury flavours in 2 hours. For the technical challenge, Paul asked the bakers to make 6 deep-fried, identical custard & jam finger doughnuts in 2 hours and 45 minutes. For the showstopper challenge, the bakers were required to make an ice cream cake, which was considerably more difficult since it was the hottest day of the year, in 4 hours and 30 minutes.

Baker	Signature (8 Quiches)	Technical (6 Custard & Jam Finger Doughnuts)	Showstopper (Ice Cream Cake)	Result
Dave	Novel Quiches	6th	'Tiramisu'	Safe
Hermine	Classic Quiches	1st	Holiday Ice Cream Cake	Star Baker
Laura	Pea & Pizza Quiches	4th	'Death by Chocolate'	Safe
Lottie	English Breakfast & Summer Salad Quiches	5th	'80's Mix Tape'	Eliminated
Marc	Cornish Quiches	3rd	Retro Ice Cream Parlour	Safe
Peter	Thai Curry and Salmon Quiches	2nd	'Christmas Cake Surprise'	Safe

=== Episode 8: Desserts (Quarterfinals) ===
The signature challenge tasked the bakers with making 12 mini baked cheesecakes, in 2 1/2 hours. For the technical challenge, Prue set a 17th-century bake: 2 sussex pond puddings using suet pastry and served with creme anglaise, in 2 1/2 hours. For the showstopper challenge, the bakers were given the enormous task of making a jelly art design cake, composed of an artistic jelly design, a mousse and a baked sponge element in 4 1/2 hours.

Baker	Signature (12 Mini Cheesecakes)	Technical (2 Sussex Pond Puddings)	Showstopper (Jelly Art Design Cake)	Result
Dave	'Celebration of Citrus' Cheesecakes	5th	Newquay Beach Scene	Safe
Hermine	Passion Fruit Cheesecakes	3rd	Chocolate and Raspberry Mousse Jelly Cake	Star Baker
Laura	Passion Fruit Cheesecakes	1st	'Flower Power' Koi Jelly Art Cake	Safe
Marc	New York Style Vanilla and Mascarpone Cheesecakes	2nd	Apple Jelly with Chocolate and Strawberry Mousse	Eliminated
Peter	Lime & Ginger Cheesecakes	4th	Snow Globe Jelly Cake	Safe

=== Episode 9: Pâtisserie (Semifinals) ===
The signature challenge required the bakers to make 12 pâte à savarin in 2 hours and 45 minutes. The penultimate technical challenge, set by Paul, gave the bakers the challenging task of making a Danish cornucopia cake, kransekage, in 2 hours and 15 minutes. For the showstopper challenge, the bakers were given 4 1/2 hours to make 25 cube-shaped cakes that required the precision expected in pâtisseries.

Baker	Signature (12 Pâte à Savarin)	Technical (Danish Kransekage Cornucopia Cake)	Showstopper (25 Mini Cube-shaped Cakes)	Result
Dave	Honey Tequila, Mango & Passion Fruit Savarins	3rd	Celebration of Chocolate Cube Cake	Safe
Hermine	Crème et Abricot Baba au Rhum	2nd	'The Best of Hermine' Cube Cake	Eliminated
Laura	Poached Pineapple, Kiwi & Passion Fruit Rum Babas	4th	Black Forest Cube Cake	Safe
Peter	Strawberry & Elderflower Babas	1st	Chocolate, Raspberry & Pistachio Cube Cake	Star Baker

=== Episode 10: Final ===
For the final signature challenge, the finalists were tasked with making 8 beautifully decorated custard slices in 2 1/2 hours. For the final technical challenge, Prue asked the bakers to make 8 identical walnut whirls—a cone of chocolate with marshmallow inside, a biscuit base, and topped with walnuts—in 2 hours. For the final showstopper challenge, the bakers were tasked with making a colossal, spectacular dessert tower with a large cake at the base and at least 3 sections to represent the different baking disciplines, in 4 1/2 hours.

The judges said this was the closest final in the history of the show.

Baker	Signature (8 Custard Slices)	Technical (8 Walnut Whirls)	Showstopper (Dessert Tower)	Result
Dave	'Caramel Latte' Custard Slice	1st	Tower to Redemption	Runner-up
Laura	Yuzu Custard Slice	3rd	Rainbow Dessert Tower	Runner-up
Peter	Cranachan Custard Slice	2nd	Bonkers Baking Show Bubble Cake	Winner (Note: Peter is the youngest ever winner of the Great British Bake Off.)

== Specials ==
Two compilation episodes of The Great British Bake Off: Best Bits, showing highlights from the previous ten series, were shown in the weeks after the final. These were followed by two further specials focusing on the previous 10 winners: The Great British Bake Off: The Winners. The first episode covered the first five champions, the second the last five.

Two specials were commissioned for the festive season:

=== The Great Christmas Bake Off ===
The Great Christmas Bake Off features James Hillery from Series 8, Ruby Bhogal from Series 9, Jamie Finn and Rosie Brandreth-Poynter both from Series 10. An Extra Slice presenter Tom Allen, took over Noel Fielding as co-host with Matt Lucas, as Fielding welcomed the birth of his second child prior to filming and was on paternity leave.

For the signature challenge, the bakers were given 3 hours to create 12 miniature panettones. Prue's technical challenge required the bakers to make a quick Christmas pudding (with mincemeat made from scratch), to be cooked in a microwave and served with a crème anglaise, in 1 hour and 15 minutes. The showstopper challenge asked the bakers to make an illusion cake to depict their ultimate Christmas day feast in 4 hours.

Baker	Signature (12 Panettones)	Technical (Christmas Pudding)	Showstopper (Festive Feast Illusion Cake)	Result
James	Piña Colada Panettone	2nd	Cola Ham & All The Trimmings	Runner-up
Jamie	American Football Panettones	4th	'Fried Turkey' Bucket	Runner-up
Rosie	Date, Cranberry & Mace Panettones	1st	Memories of a Childhood Christmas Feast	Winner
Ruby	Boozy Chai, Cherry & Chocolate Panettones	3rd	Christmas Brekkie Fit For An Elf	Runner-up

=== The Great New Year Bake Off ===
The Great New Year Bake Off featured Helena Garcia and Henry Bird from Series 10 as well as Series 5 winner Nancy Birtwhistle and Series 9 winner Rahul Mandal, making it the first time in the show's history two former winners were featured competing against each other. Noel Fielding returned to host alongside Matt Lucas.

The signature challenge required the bakers to make a fruit crumble, served with a complementary ice cream, in 2 hours. Paul's technical challenge tasked the bakers with making 6 steamed bao buns with shredded crispy duck fillings in 2 hours. To celebrate the 2021 New Year, the bakers were asked to make a cake celebrating their 21st birthday for the showstopper challenge in 4 hours.

Baker	Signature (Fruit Crumble with Ice Cream)	Technical (6 Bao Buns)	Showstopper (21st Birthday Cake)	Result
Helena	'Rest In Pieces' Peach Crumble with Salted Butter and Pecan 'Ice-scream'	2nd	'My First Witch's Altar'	Runner-up
Henry	Plum, Blackberry & Ginger Crumble with Honey & Ginger Ice Cream	3rd	Three Tier Raspberry, Thyme & Roasted Rhubarb Cake	Runner-up
Nancy	Caribbean Crumble with Lime Crusted Coconut Ice Cream	4th	21st Birthday Cake	Runner-up
Rahul	Spiced Apple, Rhubarb & Plum Crumble with Orange & Ginger Ice Cream	1st	Chocolate & Orange Cake with Hazelnut & Chocolate Swiss Meringue Buttercream	Winner

== Ratings ==
The premiere episode of the series had the best start for the show since it moved to Channel 4, with an average of 6.9 million viewers tuning in and peaking at 7.9 million according to overnight viewing figures. The weekly consolidated audience figure was reported to be 10.8 million, which increased to 11.2 million after viewers who watched on other devices were included. This is the highest rating for any series on Channel 4 in 35 years after the miniseries A Woman of Substance, which was watched by 13.9 million viewers in 1985. The overnight audience figure rose to an average of 9.2 million for the final, peaking at 10.4 million. The consolidated audience figure for the finale was 11.5 million, the second highest for a commissioned programme in Channel 4 history, and the consolidated figure averaged at 10.6 million for the series.

Episode no.	Airdate	7-day viewers (millions)	28-day viewers (millions)	Channel 4 weekly ranking	Weekly ranking all channels
1	22 September 2020	11.21	11.84	1	1
2	29 September 2020	10.81	11.38	1	1
3	6 October 2020	10.70	11.21	1	1
4	13 October 2020	10.63	11.17	1	1
5	20 October 2020	10.66	11.10	1	2
6	27 October 2020	10.37	10.79	1	3
7	3 November 2020	10.87	11.27	1	1
8	10 November 2020	10.91	11.26	1	3
9	17 November 2020	10.83	10.98	1	8
10	24 November 2020	11.74	11.84	1	1

In the US, collection 8 was ranked amongst the top 10 most-streamed shows in the US, according to Nielsen's streaming rankings for the week of October 12. With 674 million minutes streamed, the show was the 5th most watched program on Netflix for the week.
