= Maids of honour tart =

Baked tart with cheese

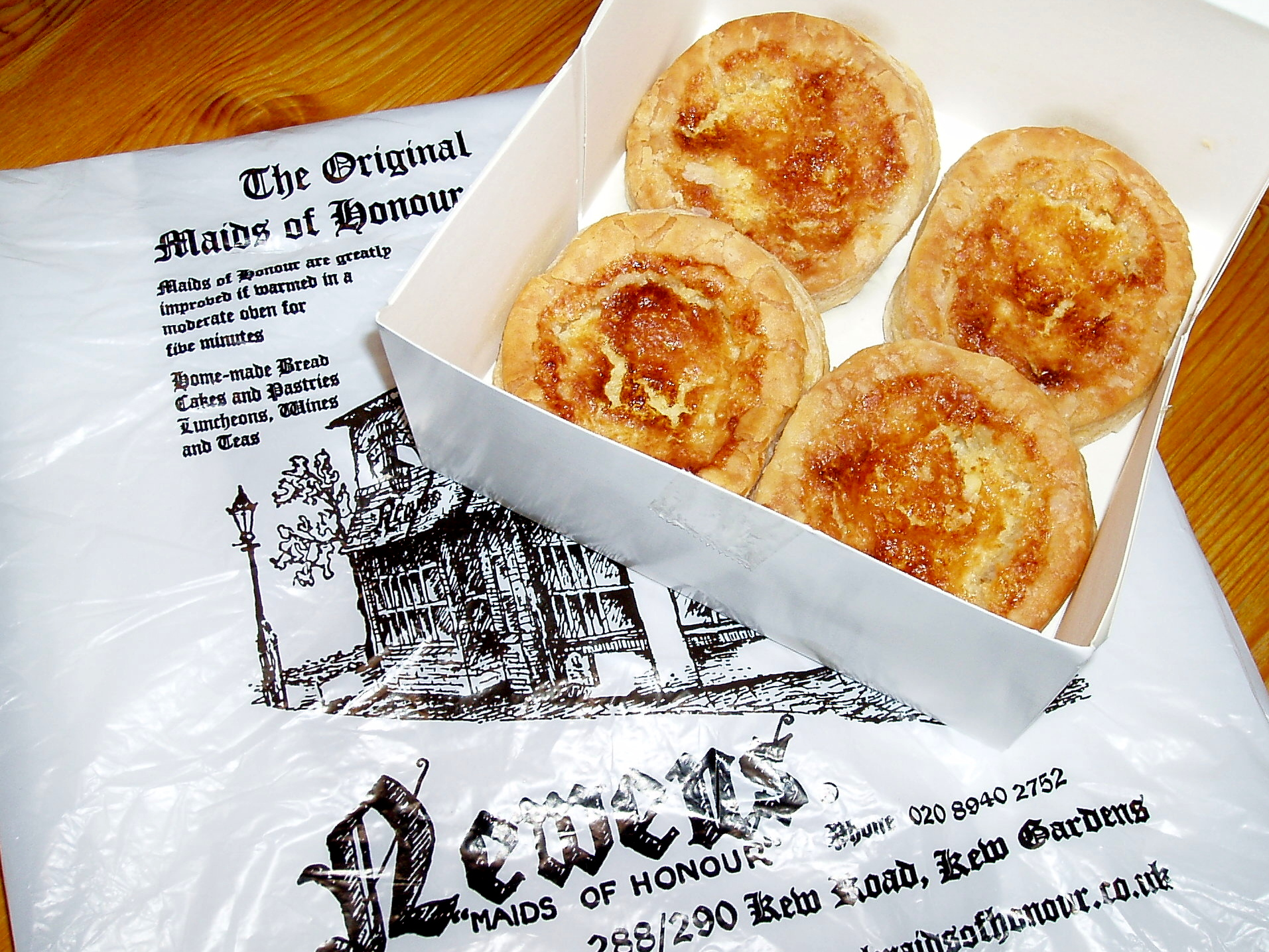
- Type: Tart
- Region or state: Surrey
- Main ingredients: Puff pastry, Cheese curds

Maids of honour tart (also known as maids of honour cake and Richmond maids of honour) is a traditional English baked tart consisting of a puff pastry shell filled with cheese curds. A variation is to add jam or almonds and nutmeg. Traditionally the tart was a puff pastry filled with sweetened milk curds.

== History ==
The tart is said to date back to King Henry VIII when he witnessed some of the Queen's maids of honour eating some cakes and demanded to taste one. He found them delicious and named them after the maids. Some even claim that the maid who made the tarts was imprisoned and had to produce them solely for the King. However, there is another theory that they were named after Anne Boleyn, a maid of honour at the time, who made the cakes for Henry VIII.

A tea room in Kew, south-west London, "The Original Maids of Honour", dates back to the 18th century and was set up specifically to sell these tarts.

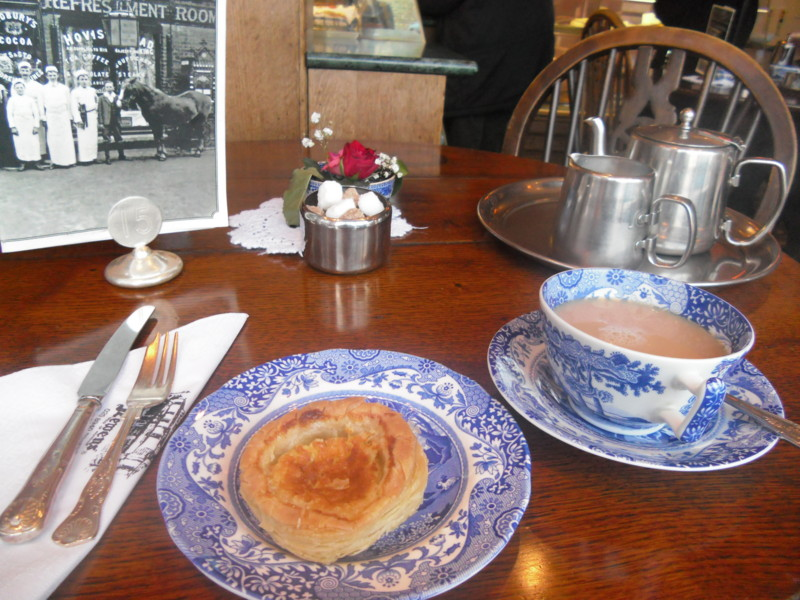
Maids of honour tart at Newens

== See also ==
- Custard tart
- List of pies, tarts and flans
