= Fantasy couture =

Type of haute couture fashion

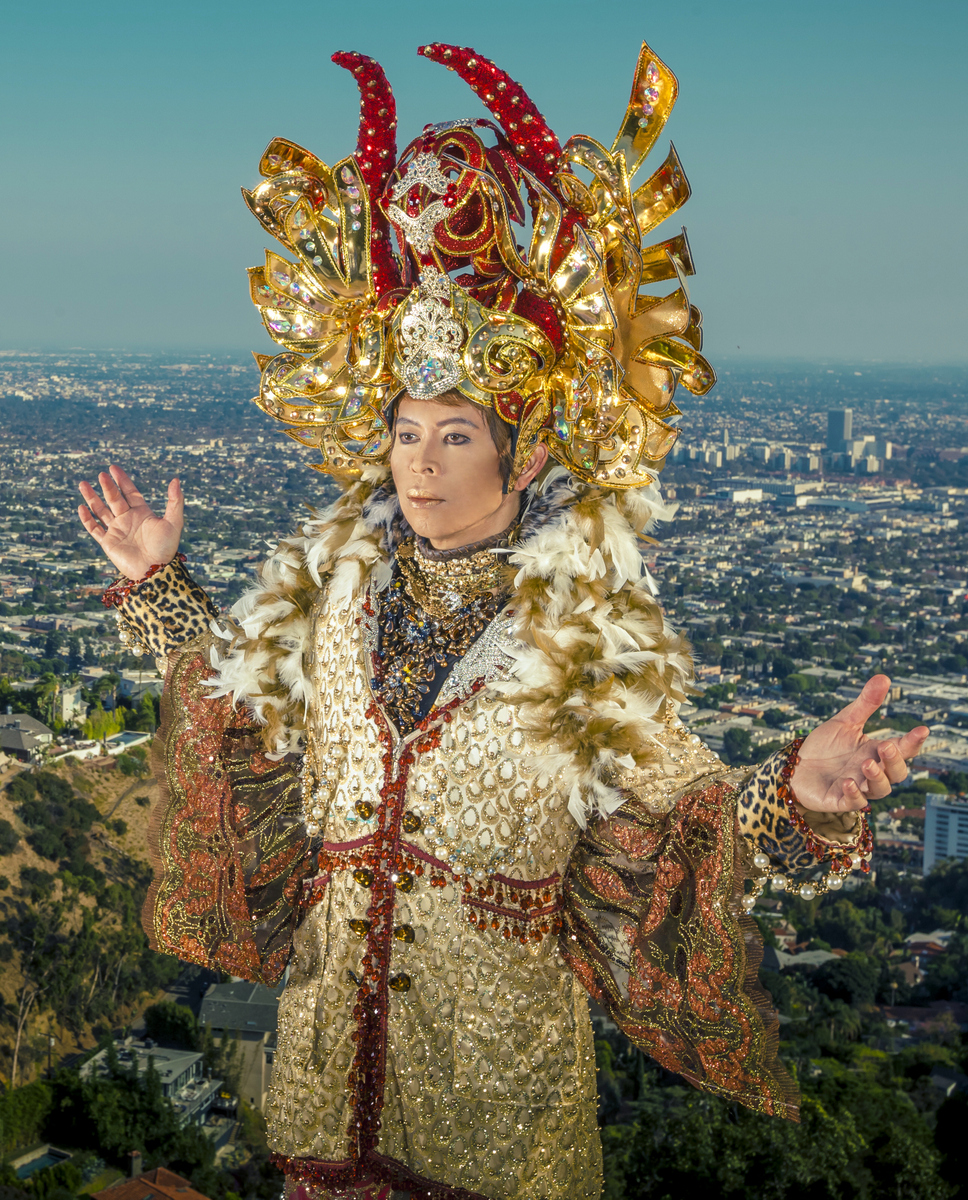
A fantasy couture costume by designer Bobby Love

Fantasy couture, also sometimes called couture fantasy, is a type of haute couture. It represents a fashion and design trend that emphasizes fantastical appearance over practicality/functionality. It draws elements from the fantasy genre of literature and film, often presented in an extreme style characterized by detail, complexity, and precision.

== List of fantasy couturiers ==
The trend is characterized by individuals such as:

- Iris van Herpen
- Alexander McQueen
- Eiko Ishioka
- Tex Saverio
- Guo Pei
- Viktor & Rolf
- Matières Fécales
- Kevin Germanier
- Robert Wun
- Tomo Koizumi
- Sohee Park
- Tim Yip
- Yuima Nakazato
- Stefano Ciammitti
- Julien Fournié
- Charles de Vilmorin
- Gaurav Gupta
- Mary Sibande
- The Blonds
- Manuel Albarran
- Stephen Jones
- Bobby Love

== Notable example ==
An example of this style is performed annually at the Labyrinth of Jareth Masquerade Ball held in Hollywood, California, named for the 1986 film Labyrinth.
