= The Great British Bake Off series 8 =

Eighth series of The Great British Bake Off

The Great British Bake Off
- Series 8
- Presented by: Noel Fielding; Sandi Toksvig
- Judges: Paul Hollywood; Prue Leith
- No. of contestants: 12
- Winner: Sophie Faldo
- Runners-up: Kate Lyon; Steven Carter-Bailey
- Location: Welford Park, Berkshire
- No. of max. bakes: 30
- No. of episodes: 10

Release
- Original network: Channel 4
- Original release: 29 August – 31 October 2017

Series chronology
- ← Previous; Series 7 Next → Series 9

The eighth series of The Great British Bake Off began on 29 August 2017, with this being the first of The Great British Bake Off to be broadcast on Channel 4, after the production company Love Productions moved the show from BBC One. It is the first series for new hosts Noel Fielding and Sandi Toksvig, and new judge Prue Leith.

This series was won by Sophie Faldo, with Kate Lyon and Steven Carter-Bailey finishing as runners-up.

== Bakers ==
Contestant	Age	Hometown	Occupation	Finish	Place
Peter Abatan	52	Southend, England	IT Programme Manager	Episode 1	12th
Chris Geiger	50	Bristol, England	Software Developer	Episode 2	11th
Flo Atkins	71	Merseyside, England	Retired	Episode 3	10th
Tom Hetherington	29	Edinburgh, Scotland	Architect	Episode 4	9th
James Hillery	46	Brentwood, England	Banker	Episode 5	8th
Julia Chernogorova	21	Crawley, England	Aviation Broker	Episode 6	7th
Chuen-Yan "Yan" Tsou	46	North London, England	Laboratory Research Scientist	Episode 7	6th
Liam Charles	19	North London, England	Student	Episode 8	5th
Stacey Hart	42	Radlett, England	Former School Teacher	Episode 9	4th
Kate Lyon	29	Merseyside, England	Health and Safety Inspector	Episode 10	Runner-up
Steven Carter-Bailey	34	Watford, England	Marketer	Episode 10	Runner-up
Sophie Faldo	33	West Molesey, England	Former Army Officer and Trainee Stunt Woman	Episode 10	1st

== Results summary ==
Elimination chart
Baker	1	2	3	4	5	6	7	8	9	10
Sophie	HIGH	HIGH	SAFE	SAFE	SB	HIGH	HIGH	SAFE	SB	WINNER
Kate	SAFE	LOW	SAFE	SB	SAFE	SAFE	LOW	LOW	HIGH	Runner-up
Steven	SB	SB	HIGH	SAFE	SAFE	SAFE	SB	HIGH	LOW	Runner-up
Stacey	LOW	LOW	SAFE	SAFE	HIGH	LOW	LOW	SB	OUT	
Liam	SAFE	SAFE	LOW	HIGH	LOW	SB	HIGH	OUT		
Yan	SAFE	SAFE	SAFE	SAFE	SAFE	HIGH	OUT			
Julia	SAFE	SAFE	SB	SAFE	LOW	OUT				
James	SAFE	SAFE	SAFE	LOW	OUT					
Tom	SAFE	HIGH	SAFE	OUT						
Flo	HIGH	LOW	OUT							
Chris	LOW	OUT								
Peter	OUT									

Colour key:

Baker was one of the judges' least favourite bakers that week, but was not eliminated.
Baker was one of the judges' favourite bakers that week, but was not the Star Baker.
Baker got through to the next round.
Baker was eliminated.
Baker was the Star Baker.
Baker was a series runner-up.
Baker was the series winner.

== Episodes ==
Colour key:

Baker was eliminated at conclusion of episode
Baker received a "Hollywood handshake" for respective bake
Baker was named "Star Baker" at conclusion of episode
Baker was named runner-up for the series
Baker won series

=== Episode 1: Cakes ===
For the first challenge, the bakers were instructed to make a cake using fresh fruit, with no dried fruit permitted, in 2 hours. For the technical challenge, the bakers were instructed to make 12 chocolate mini rolls using Prue Leith's recipe which contains peppermint cream, in 2 hours. The showstopper challenge required the bakers to make an illusion cake: a cake that appears to be some other object. They had 4 hours to complete the task.

Baker	Signature (Fruity Cake)	Technical (12 Chocolate Mini Rolls)	Showstopper (Illusion Cake)	Result
Chris	Tropical Fresh Fruit Cake	12th	'Raised Pork Pie and Egg Surprise' Cake	Safe
Flo	Citrus Layer Cake	9th	'One in a Melon' Cake	Safe
James	Orange, Rhubarb & Ginger Crumble Cake	2nd	'Mock-accino and Croissant' Cake	Safe
Julia	Courgette and Lemon Cake	3rd	'Russian Doll' Cake	Safe
Kate	Moroccan Strawberry and Rose Cake	1st	'Chocolate Terrarium' Cake	Safe
Liam	Apple and Almond Crumble Maple Loaf	8th	'Stackin' Sunday' Cake	Safe
Peter	Coconut Cake	10th	'Bread on a Breadboard' Cake	Eliminated
Sophie	Pineapple and Coconut Sandwich Cake	5th	'Champagne Bottle and Bucket' Cake	Safe
Stacey	Granny Smith Apple and Walnut Cake	11th	'Black Evening Clutch Bag' Cake	Safe
Steven	Bonfire Night Cake	6th	'A Baker's Lunch' Cake	Star Baker
Tom	Gilded Pear and Cardamom Cake	7th	'Stack of Books' Cake	Safe
Yan	Windfall Apple Crumble Cake	4th	'Banana-ramen' Cake	Safe

=== Episode 2: Biscuits ===
For the signature challenge, the bakers were instructed to make 24 sandwich biscuits in 2 hours and 15 minutes. For the technical challenge, the bakers faced a very difficult challenge of making 12 fortune cookies of 2 types of flavours – 6 almond and 6 orange, in 2 hours. For the final showstopper challenge, the bakers were required to make a biscuit board game that should be at least 40 cm (16 in) long in diameter and has at least eight elements in 3 1/2 hours.

Baker	Signature (24 Sandwich Biscuits)	Technical (12 Fortune Cookies)	Showstopper (Biscuit Board Games)	Result
Chris	Chocolate Chia Seed Biscuits with Whisky Caramel Filling	11th	'The Great British Sail Off' Game	Eliminated
Flo	Gin Jam Butties	10th	'Pick My Bones' Game	Safe
James	Rhubarb and Custard Whirls	3rd	'Coppit' Game	Safe
Julia	Middle Eastern Delight Sandwich Biscuits	4th	'A British Baking' Game	Safe
Kate	Coconut Seashells for a Titanic Afternoon Tea	8th	'Jungle' Game	Safe
Liam	Coffee Malted Pecan Shorties	7th	'Classroom Classics' Game	Safe
Sophie	Lemon Limoncino Sandwich Biscuits	2nd	'Snakes and Ladders' Game	Safe
Stacey	Sparkly Chocolate and Marshmallow Fluff Cookies	9th	'Get to School' Game	Safe
Steven	Amarpressi Biscuits	6th	'Check Bake' Game	Star Baker
Tom	Coffee and Amaretto Kisses	5th	'Drain Pipes and Ladders' Game	Safe
Yan	'Mrs. Marian's PB 'n' B' Biscuits	1st	'Adventures in Bakeland' Game	Safe

=== Episode 3: Bread ===
The bakers were instructed to make 12 teacakes in 2 3/4 hours in the signature challenge. For the technical challenge, the bakers were tasked to make a cottage loaf in 2 1/2 hours. For the showstopper challenge, the bakers were required to make a multicoloured bread sculpture with at least 3 colours using natural food colouring in 4 1/2 hours.

Baker	Signature (12 Teacakes)	Technical (Cottage Loaf)	Showstopper (Multicoloured Bread Sculpture)	Result
Flo	Cinnamon and Orange Teacakes	7th	'Davy Jones' Locker' Bread Sculpture	Eliminated
James	Nordic Teacakes	9th	'Owl in the Woods' Bread Sculpture	Safe
Julia	Earl Grey Dried Fruit Teacakes	2nd	'The Snail Under a Mushroom' Bread Sculpture	Star Baker
Kate	Blueberry Buns	10th	'Kraken' Bread Sculpture	Safe
Liam	Jamaican Spiced Teacakes	5th	'Kneadapolitan' Bread Sculpture	Safe
Sophie	Tagine Teacakes	6th	'Picnic Basket' Bread Sculpture	Safe
Stacey	Cranberry and Cinnamon Teacakes	1st	'Ascot Hat' Bread Sculpture	Safe
Steven	Madras Cocktail Teacakes	3rd	'The Bag I Knead' Bread Sculpture	Safe
Tom	Orange and Cranberry Teacakes	4th	'Pink & Yellow Rose Centrepiece' Bread Sculpture	Safe
Yan	'Mrs P's' Masala Chai Spiced Teacakes	8th	'Basil the Vegetarian Dragon with his Pumpkin Hoard' Bread Sculpture	Safe

=== Episode 4: Caramel ===
For the first signature challenge, the bakers were required to produce 18 identical millionaire shortbread bars in 2 hours and 15 minutes. The technical challenge was set by Prue Leith where the bakers were tasked to make 12 stroopwafels in 1 hour and 45 minutes. Only one test waffle was allowed, and the challenge proved to be a very difficult one for the bakers with none of them producing an adequate caramel. For the final showstopper challenge, the bakers were required to make a caramel cake consisting of at least three layers of sponge in 3 1/2 hours. They were required to incorporate spun sugar into their decorations.

Baker	Signature (18 Millionaire Shortbreads)	Technical (12 Stroopwafels)	Showstopper (Caramel Cake)	Result
James	'Windy City' Millionaire Shortbreads	2nd	Nutty Caramel Cake	Safe
Julia	Pecan Salted Caramel Millionaire Shortbreads	9th	Poppy Seed Caramel Cake	Safe
Kate	Salted Bay Caramel Millionaire Shortbreads	6th	Sticky Toffee Apple Caramel Cake	Star Baker
Liam	Salted Peanut Butter Millionaire Shortbreads	3rd	White Layered Ginger Caramel Cake	Safe
Sophie	Jaffa Millionaire Shortbreads	4th	Bird's Nest Caramel Cake	Safe
Stacey	Rum Salted Caramel Millionaire Shortbreads	1st	Chocolate and Coffee Caramel Cake	Safe
Steven	Orange Macadamia Nut Millionaire Shortbreads	7th	Caramel Crown Cake	Safe
Tom	Stem Ginger Caramel Shortbreads	5th	Hummingbird Cake	Eliminated
Yan	'Lil' Red's Ginger and Nuts' Millionaire Shortbreads	8th	Animals of the Rainforest Caramel Cake	Safe

=== Episode 5: Puddings ===
For the signature challenge, the 8 remaining bakers were required to bake a steamed school pudding with an accompaniment such as a compote or a custard in 3 hours. The technical challenge was set by Paul Hollywood where the bakers had to bake 6 molten chocolate puddings with a peanut butter filling in 1 hour. Each baker was called one at a time so their puddings could be ready at different times for Paul and Prue to judge (starting with Julia, followed by Sophie, Liam, Steven, Yan, Kate, James and finally Stacey). For the showstopper challenge, the bakers were asked to bake an ornamental trifle terrine with three elements—a baked element, a set custard or mousse, and a jelly—in 4 1/2 hours .

Baker	Signature (Steamed School Pudding)	Technical (6 Molten Chocolate Puddings)	Showstopper (Ornamental Trifle Terrine)	Result
James	Orange and Ginger Steamed School Pudding	7th	'The Missed Silver Jubilee' Trifle Terrine	Eliminated
Julia	Orange & Treacle Steamed School Pudding	3rd	'Opulent Ornament' Trifle Terrine	Safe
Kate	'Mr Darcy's Steamy Lake Scene' Steamed School Pudding	8th	'My Great Great Nan's' Raspberry Trifle Terrine	Safe
Liam	Cherries & Lemons that are 'Baked Well'	2nd	'Cheers Lads' Trifle Terrine	Safe
Sophie	Ginger, Fig and Honey Steamed School Pudding	1st	Raspberry, Yuzu & White Chocolate Bûche Trifle Terrine	Star Baker
Stacey	Bakewell Tart Steamed School Pudding	4th	Tropical Trifle Terrine	Safe
Steven	Lemon & Blackcurrant Drizzle Steamed School Pudding	5th	'From Across the Jelly Pond' Trifle Terrine	Safe
Yan	Mango Fruit Hat Steamed School Pudding	6th	'Heart of a Hero' Trifle Terrine	Safe

=== Episode 6: Pastry ===
In the signature challenge, the bakers were required to produce 4 decorative savoury pies using shortcrust pastry with different designs on the pies that share a common theme in 2 1/2 hours. For the technical challenge, set by Paul, the bakers were tasked to produce 12 pastéis de nata using rough puff pastry in 2 hours. For the final showstopper challenge, the bakers were required to produce a family-sized hand-raised pie with a savoury filling using hot water crust pastry, topped with glazed fruits in 4 hours.

Baker	Signature (4 Shortcrust Savoury Pies)	Technical (12 Pastéis de Nata)	Showstopper (Family-Sized Hand-Raised Pie)	Result
Julia	'Pies from the Tree' Decorative Pies	7th	'Special Occasion' Pie	Eliminated
Kate	'Vegetarian Pie Faces' Decorative Pies	5th	Potato Curry Pie with Mango & Chilli Glaze	Safe
Liam	'Standard FC' Decorative Pies	4th	'Nan's Sunday Dinner' Pie	Star Baker
Sophie	'The Four Seasons' Decorative Pies	2nd	Game Pie with Glazed Forest Fruits	Safe
Stacey	'Love Theme' Decorative Pies	6th	Indian Hand Raised Pie with Mango	Safe
Steven	'Fleetwood Mac' Decorative Pies	3rd	Christmas Pie	Safe
Yan	'πr^{2}' Decorative Pies	1st	Chequerboard Pie	Safe

=== Episode 7: Italian ===
For the first ever Italian week in Bake Off, the bakers were given 2 1/2 hours to make the required 18 Sicilian cannolis with 3 different types of fillings. This week's Italian technical challenge was set by Prue Leith, where the bakers were tasked to make the well-known, yet tricky, Pizza Margherita with a thin crispy base in 1 1/2 hours. For the showstopper challenge, the bakers were required to make a very technically challenging and fiddly Italian bake: 24 sfogliatelles with 2 types of fillings in 4 1/2 hours.

Baker	Signature (18 Cannolis)	Technical (Pizza Margherita)	Showstopper (24 Sfogliatelle)	Result
Kate	'Happy Hour' Cocktail Cannoli	6th	'Flavour Fusion' Sfogliatelle	Safe
Liam	'Just Doing Me' Cannoli	2nd	'Morning Delivery' Sfogliatelle	Safe
Sophie	'Classics with a Twist' Cannoli	3rd	'Classics' Sfogliatelle	Safe
Stacey	My All Time Favourite Desserts	4th	Pastry Surprise	Safe
Steven	Italian Style Cannoli	1st	'Sicilian-style' Sfogliatelle	Star Baker
Yan	Cannoli Cocktails	5th	Canadian Style Sfogliatelle	Eliminated

=== Episode 8: Forgotten Bakes (Quarterfinals) ===
The bakers were required to make 4 Bedfordshire Clangers within 2 hours in the signature challenge. Each must contain a savoury filling at one end and a sweet filling at the other, and be made from suet crust pastry. In the technical challenge, set by Paul Hollywood, the bakers were given 1^{1}/_{2} hours to make a traditional Cumberland Rum Nicky: a large tart consisting of a sweet shortcrust pastry, a rum-soaked fruity filling covered with a lattice top, and served with a smooth rum butter. For the historic showstopper, the bakers had 3^{1}/_{2} hours to make a Victorian Savoy cake, a sponge cake baked in a mold, often in elaborate architectural shapes, with a hard sugar crust or coating that helped preserve it as it served as a banquet centrepiece.

Baker	Signature (4 Bedfordshire Clangers)	Technical (Cumberland Rum Nicky)	Showstopper (Victorian Savoy Cake)	Result
Kate	Burrito Bedfordshire Clangers	2nd	'Liver Building Turret' Savoy Cake	Safe
Liam	'Take Out' Bedfordshire Clangers	5th	'Fort Wizardore' Savoy Cake	Eliminated
Sophie	Char Siu & Banana Praline Bedfordshire Clangers	4th	Citrus with Green Apple Croquembouche Savoy Cake	Safe
Stacey	Camembert & Onion and Apple & Blueberry Bedfordshire Clangers	3rd	'Bright' Lemon & Orange Savoy Cake	Star Baker
Steven	'Mediterranean Medley' Bedfordshire Clangers	1st	Chestnut Rum Savoy Cake	Safe

=== Episode 9: Pâtisserie (Semi-final) ===
For the semifinal signature bakes, the bakers were asked to make 24 choux buns—12 must have a crunchy craquelin on top, and the other 12 must be covered with icing—in 2 1/2 hours. For the technical challenge, which was set by Prue Leith, the bakers were tasked with a very difficult job of making 9 Les Misérables slices to be done in 3 hours. For the showstopper challenge before the final, the bakers were asked to make a meringue centrepiece, containing at least two different types of meringue and a dessert element, in 4 hours and 45 minutes.

Baker	Signature (24 Choux Buns)	Technical (9 Les Misérables Slices)	Showstopper (Meringue Centrepiece)	Result
Kate	Bellini and Valencian Orange Choux Buns	4th	'Rainbow' Meringue Centrepiece	Safe
Sophie	Strawberry & Rhubarb and Chestnut & Vanilla Choux Buns	1st	'Tutu with Opera Filling' Meringue Centrepiece	Star Baker
Stacey	'Choux-nicorn and Choux-moji' Choux Buns	2nd	'Flamingos in Love' Meringue Centrepiece	Eliminated
Steven	Key Lime Cheesecake and Bakewell Tart Choux Buns	3rd	'Some Air Over the Rainbow' Meringue Centrepiece	Safe

=== Episode 10: Final ===
For the signature challenge in the final, the last 3 bakers were tasked to make a batch of 12 small loaves. There must be 3 different types of loaves—4 need to be intricately shaped (e.g. plaited), 4 need to be flavoured, and 4 need to be made from an alternative grain such as spelt or buckwheat—in 3 hours. Prue set the final technical challenge, asking the bakers to make 10 ginger biscuits—5 oval and 5 square—in 2 1/2 hours. They each should have a great snap and be intricately iced with two complicated patterns. For the ultimate showstopper challenge, the bakers were tasked to make 1 large entremet, having a minimum of 5 elements, one of which must be a sponge, and covered with a glaze or ganache, all in 5 hours.

Baker	Signature (12 Small Loaves)	Technical (10 Ginger Biscuits)	Showstopper (Large Entremet)	Result
Kate	Roman Spelt, Coconut Kala Chana & Flower Breads	3rd	White Chocolate, Yuzu and Lychee Entremet	Runner-up
Sophie	Spelt Boules, Mushroom Ciabatta & Orange Plaited Brioche	2nd	'Ode to the Honey Bee' Entremet	Winner
Steven	Spelt & Rye, Toasted Garlic & Fontina and Sweet Chocolate Breads	1st	'Yin Yang' Entremet	Runner-up

== Specials ==
The two holiday specials each featured four returning contestants from the series 2–7.

The first special featured Selasi Gbormittah (Series 7), Val Stones (Series 7), Paul Jagger (Series 6) and Beca Lyne-Pirkis (Series 4). The competition was won by Paul Jagger.

The second special featured Benjamina Ebuehi (Series 7), Rav Bansal (Series 7), Sandy Docherty (Series 6) and Rob Billington (Series 2). The competition was won by Rav Bansal.

=== The Great Christmas Bake Off ===
For the signature challenge, the bakers were given 2 hours to create a Christmas family favourite: a Yule Log. The technical challenge was set by Prue, and allowed the bakers 1 1/2 hours to make 12 mince pies with lattice tops, served with brandy butter, with very limited instructions and ingredients provided. The showstopper challenge featured the bakers creating 8 snow globe cakes using a sugar glass dome to encase an edible Christmas scene on top of an entremet in 4 hours.

Baker	Signature (Yule Log)	Technical (12 Mince Pies)	Showstopper (8 Snow Globe Cakes)	Result
Beca	Gingerbread Latte Yule Log	3rd	Macaron Snowmen Globes	Runner-up
Paul	Nutty About Christmas Yule Log	1st	Penguins At Play Snow Globes	Winner
Selasi	Souche de Noel	2nd	Chocolate Chestnut Wreath Globes	Runner-up
Val	Black Forest Yule Log	4th	Memory Lane Snow Globes	Runner-up

=== The Big Festive Bake Off ===
The bakers were required to make 6 snowy Bombe Alaska tarts in the signature challenge in 2 hours and 15 minutes. The technical challenge was set by Paul, where the bakers were tasked to make a pistachio Kransekake Christmas tree consisting of twelve layers of concentric rings, topped with a star, in 2 hours and 15 minutes. For the final showstopper challenge, the bakers were required to make a magical ice cake with elaborate sugar work that create a scene of winter wonderland in 4 hours.

Baker	Signature (6 Snowy Bombe Alaska Tarts)	Technical (Pistachio Kransekake Christmas Tree)	Showstopper (Magical Ice Cake)	Result
Benjamina	Minty Mocha Tarts	3rd	Icy the Future	Runner-up
Rav	Frosty Ginger Bombe Tarts	1st	Frozen Fantasy Cake	Winner
Rob	Warming Winter Spiced Apple Alaska Tarts	4th	Frozen Mist Cake	Runner-up
Sandy	After Dinner Mint Surprise	2nd	Home for Christmas Cake	Runner-up

== Post-show career ==
Liam Charles was chosen as a co-presenter for the revamped professional version of Great British Bake Off, Bake Off: The Professionals, and in 2019 returned as co-judge for Junior Bake Off. He has written two recipe books on baking; Cheeky Treats: 70 Brilliant Bakes and Cakes, and Second Helpings.

Sophie Faldo runs her own business, Sophie Faldo Cakes. She has also appeared in an episode of a travelogue TV series Travels with a Goat.

Several bakers participated in The Great Christmas Bake Off and The Great New Year's Bake Off in the following years. In 2018, Flo Atkins and Liam Charles participated in The Great Christmas Bake Off while Steven Carter-Bailey participated in The Great New Year's Bake Off and won the special's star baker title. In 2019, Tom Hetherington and Yan Tsou participated in The Great Christmas Bake Off. In 2020, James Hillery participated in The Great Christmas Bake Off. In 2023, Sophie Faldo participated in The Great Christmas Bake Off and won the special's star baker title.

== Controversies ==
On 31 October 2017, judge Prue Leith accidentally revealed Sophie Faldo as the winner of the series on Twitter twelve hours before the finale was due to air. This caused uproar among many fans of the show. She quickly deleted the tweet and apologised to the fans who saw the tweet.

== Ratings ==
The first episode to be broadcast on Channel 4 received an overnight viewing figure of 6.5 million, which is the channel's highest viewing figure since the opening ceremony for the 2012 Paralympics, but down from the 10 million obtained in the previous series on BBC One. The overnight viewing figure for the final was 7.7 million (8.9 million at its peak), lower than the 14 million for the equivalent episode on BBC One in 2016.

Official episode viewing figures are from BARB. Figures are total counts including HD and Channel 4 +1.

Episode no.	Airdate	7 day viewers (millions)	28 day viewers (millions)	Channel 4 weekly ranking	Weekly ranking all channels
1	29 August 2017	9.46	9.72	1	
2	5 September 2017	9.23	9.53	1	2
3	12 September 2017	8.68	9.06	1	2
4	19 September 2017	8.55	8.87	1	3
5	26 September 2017	8.61	8.98	1	4
6	3 October 2017	8.61	8.91	1	4
7	10 October 2017	9.01	9.32	1	3
8	17 October 2017	8.95	9.19	1	4
9	24 October 2017	9.03	9.16	1	4
10	31 October 2017	10.04	10.13	1	4

=== Specials ===
The Great Christmas Bake Off
Episode no.	Airdate	7 day viewers (millions)	28 day viewers (millions)	Channel 4 weekly ranking	Weekly ranking all channels
	25 December 2017	4.77	5.00	1	34

The Great Festive Bake Off
Episode no.	Airdate	7 day viewers (millions)	28 day viewers (millions)	Channel 4 weekly ranking	Weekly ranking all channels
	1 January 2018	3.83	3.91	1	TBA
