= Clanger =

Clanger is a colloquial term for 'mistake'.

It may also refer to:

- Clangers, a British animated children's television series
- Traditional nickname for a person local to Bedfordshire, England
- Bedfordshire clanger, a traditional elongated dumpling
- Clanger (Australian rules football), a blatant unforced error
- A trance group founded by Simon Berry
