= Ravneet Gill =

British pastry chef

- Born: April 1991 (age 35)
- Education: University of Southampton
- Years active: 2016–present
- Spouse: Mattie Taiano (m. 2023)
- Children: 1

Ravneet Gill (born April 1991) is a British pastry chef, author of The Pastry Chef's Guide, activist and television presenter.

== Early life and education ==
Gill is from London and of Indian descent. She studied psychology at the University of Southampton.

== Career ==
Gill worked as pastry chef at St. John before founding Countertalk.

In 2020 Gill replaced Prue Leith to work as the judge on Junior Bake Off alongside Liam Charles and Harry Hill. She is founder and director of Countertalk - a job service and community that promotes healthy work environments in the food industry.

Gill is a food columnist for The Guardian "Feast" supplement and The Daily Telegraph food supplement.

She was named in CODE Quarterly's spring 2019 list of most influential women in hospitality. In 2020, she appeared on the BBC Good Food list of "game-changers" in the food scene.

== Filmography ==
Year	Title	Role	Notes
2021–present	Junior Bake Off	Judge	N/A
2023–present	Five Star Kitchen: Britain's Next Great Chef	Judge	Alongside Michel Roux Jr and Mike Reid
2025	Ravneet Gill's Chop House	Herself	Alongside husband, chef Mattie Taiano
2026	Celebrity MasterChef	Guest Judge	N/A

== Books ==
- The Pastry Chef's Guide (HarperCollins, 2020) ISBN 9781911641513
- Sugar, I Love You (HarperCollins, 2021) ISBN 9781911663829
- Baking for Pleasure (HarperCollins, 2023) ISBN 9780008603854
