= Guo Pei =

Chinese fashion designer (born 1967)

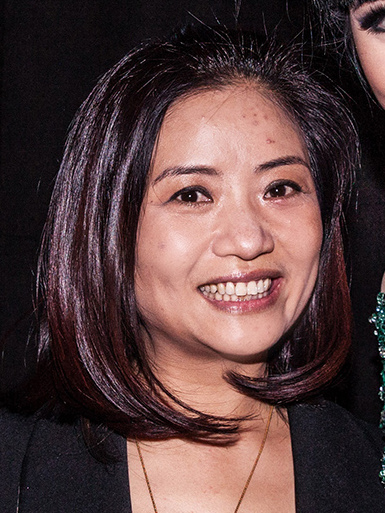
- Pei in 2017
- Born: 12 March 1967 (age 59); Haidian District, Beijing, China
- Occupations: Dressmaker; fashion designer
- Awards: ACM Best Design Exhibition 2019; International Fashion and Accessories Fair Gold Award; Beijing Olympics Costume Design Award; China International Fashion Week Best Dress Design Award

Guo Pei (Chinese: 郭培; pinyin: Guō Péi, Mandarin pronunciation: [ku̯ó pʰěɪ̯], born 1967) is a Chinese fashion designer. She is best known for designing dresses for Chinese celebrities, and in America for Rihanna's trailing yellow gown at the 2015 Met Gala. Guo is the first born-and-raised Asian designer to be invited to become a guest member of the Chambre Syndicale de la Haute Couture. In 2016, Time listed her as one of the World's 100 Most Influential People. She founded a Chinese wedding dress brand, and in 2025 held her own theme exhibition in Paris, France, "Golden Thread – Costume Art from North Africa to the East".

== Early life and start ==
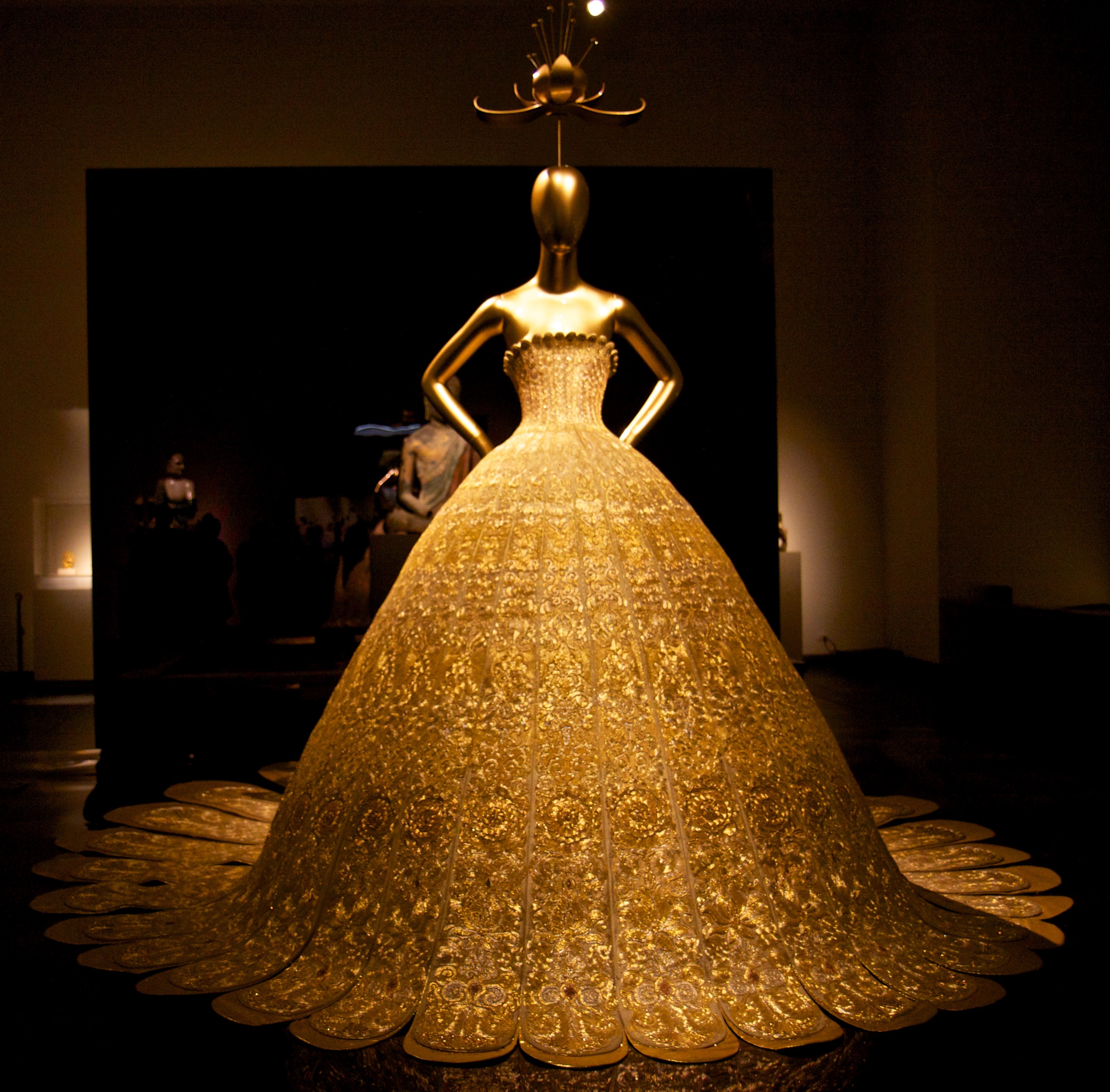
A silk couture evening gown embroidered with gold by Guo, Metropolitan Museum of Art, New York City

Guo was born in Beijing in 1967. Guo was born to two members of China's Communist Party, her father being a former battalion leader of the People's Army and her mother being a kindergarten teacher. In an interview with Forbes magazine, she recalls her father having thrown away her sketches and paintings as a child. In the same interview Guo says she got her start in sewing at the age of 2 years old, helping her mother make clothes for the winter and developed her love for dressmaking. During her childhood, Mao suits were considered the only correct form of clothing and Guo Pei defied this with loose-fitting dresses.

Despite the otherwise oppressive fashion enforced, she still went to study and graduate from Beijing Second Light Industry School with a degree in fashion design in 1986. Guo Pei's graduation was also at a good time since post-Mao reforms were being implemented by Deng Xiaoping. Guo Pei found a job at one of China's first privately owned clothing brand manufacturers, Tianma. She states that there was a sudden demand for fashion that grew in China, with one of her most popular factory designs being a brightly colored winter coat with a hood. She left the company in 1997 to form her own fashion brand.

== Career ==
Guo Pei says that she strived for something more as the fashion demand grew in China as well. In the early 2000s Guo Pei's reputation began to grow, she received commissions to create styles for the 2008 Summer Olympics as well as the annual Spring Festival Galas put on by China Central Television (CCTV). She is responsible for Song Zuying's dress that she wore during her performance with Plácido Domingo at the 2008 Summer Olympics closing ceremony. The dress took two weeks overall to make and was covered with 200,000 Swarovski crystals.

Her "One Thousand and Two Nights" collection debuted in November 2009, during China Fashion Week. American model, Carmen Dell'Orefice appeared in the show wearing an elaborate white embroidered fur-lined gown, with an escort of four to help carry its train. Dell'Orefice later went on to compare Guo to Charles James. Guo was credited as a costume designer on the set of the 2014 film The Monkey King. The film's makeup and costume departments were nominated for a Hong Kong Film Award the following year but lost out to Man Lim Chung, in The Golden Era.

In 2008, Guo conceived a canary yellow floor-length dress with a large circular train, edged with yellow coloured fur and embroidered with silver floral patterns. Now known as the omelette dress, it took approximately 50,000 hours in 20 months for her design team to create and weighed about 25 kg (55 lb) on completion. Barbadian singer Rihanna came across the piece on the internet while researching a design for the China-themed New York Met Gala in 2015. According to Guo, when first asked she agreed to the proposal but was wary about whether the singer would be able to withstand the weight. Rihanna appeared on the red carpet in the gown, followed by a three-person entourage to hold the large train. Early reactions to the dress design spawned viral memes on social media, with the eye catching yellow material and sizable train drawing comparisons to omelettes and pizzas. A photo of the design worn by the singer was featured on the front page of Vogue's Met Gala edition. This media exposure made Guo more recognizable among Western audiences.

Guo Pei's works were also exhibited at the annual exhibition at the Metropolitan Museum of Art in New York, titled "China: Through the Looking Glass". In 2016, Guo Pei became a guest member of the Chambre Syndicale de la Haute Couture.

Her first collection to be showcased as a part of Paris Fashion Week was her Spring Summer 2016 collection. Inspired by spring flowers for femininity and the phoenix for peace and purity, the collection had traditional Chinese influences like gold tassels, intricate threadwork embroidery over silk, bibs and long trains.

Her Spring 2017 haute couture collection, presented at La Conciergerie and titled "Legend", was inspired by the murals of the St. Gallen Cathedral in Switzerland.

Guo Pei's 2018 haute couture Spring/Summer show was considered to embody life through her use of forestry and roots in her runway setups to the designs of her clothing themselves. There was a recurring theme of dark blue embroideries hinting at the idea of dawn or dusk, the French idea of l'heure bleue. Almost all the designs incorporated this blue shade, whether as the main focus of a garment or in the smaller details. Guo Pei described her work as representing a life force of roots and flowers, explaining, "Roots are the source of life and vitality ... Without roots, there's not life. This world is a very mysterious place, but it's linked intimately with our lives. That's why the tree is onstage, and you'll see a lot of flowers." One of the connecting pieces in Guo Pei's collections, however, is the use of gold in a lot of her shows. Guo Pei believes not only that gold embodies the top of terms of knowledge and wealth, but also that it is "the color of our souls".

In 2022 Guo Pei's work was featured at the San Francisco Legion of Honor and displayed several of her works from the past two decades of her career in the fashion style of couture fantasy from 16 April to 27 November. It became the most attended exhibition in 20 years at the museum.

Guo Pei designed the costumes of the character of Chang'e for the 2020 Netflix film Over The Moon.

== Personal life ==
Guo is married to Cao Bao Jie, also known as Jack Tsao, who is a textile dealer. She credits him with introducing her to European fabrics and embroideries, and empowering her to recognise herself as an haute couturière instead of just a tailor. Guo's husband oversees the branding and business side of Guo's label.

Guo is a renowned Chinese fashion designer whose works have gained widespread acclaim and recognition. Guo's most famous dress is Yellow Empress cape; the dress's remarkable design inspired parallels to omelets, and its creation took two years and over 50,000 hours. The annual exhibition at New York's Metropolitan Museum of Art also featured pieces by Guo. In 2016, she made history by being the first designer of Asian descent to be invited to join the Chambre Syndicale de la Haute Couture as a guest member. Guo uses intricate details, gold embroidery, and a recurring theme of l'heure bleue in her designs, signifying dawn or dusk. Her runway arrangement for her Spring/Summer 2021 haute couture presentation, which featured a forest and roots, was a demonstration of her ability to capture the essence of life in her creations.

== Rose Studio ==
Rose Studio is the name of Guo's showroom in the Chaoyang district of Beijing, and is three stories in what would be considered a drab area near in an industrial park. On the outside, it can be mistaken for a normal factory, but on the inside gold-speckled mirrors line the walls and ceilings. Guo's designs are housed in displays like a museum. On the top floor, dozens of tailors, pattern cutters, shoemakers, and needlewomen work on the orders, with painstaking measures taken to make sure everything works in harmony with one another. Guo employs five hundred people at three locations outside of China's capital, most learning about their craft on the job, stating that Guo is a good teacher. Guo's clients are usually wealthy and well to do, but most of her older clients state that they are embracing a more Chinese style.
