= Con Mum =

- Directed by: Nick Green
- Produced by: Harry Harris; Nick Holt; Jeremy Lee
- Starring: Graham Hornigold; Dionne Marie Hanna; Heather Kaniuk
- Release date: March 25, 2025 (United States)
- Running time: 89 minutes
- Country: United Kingdom
- Language: English

Con Mum is a 2025 British documentary film directed by Nick Green. The 90-minute feature chronicles the true story of Graham Hornigold, a celebrated British pastry chef, who was defrauded of nearly £300,000 by a woman, Dionne Marie Hanna, who claimed to be his mother. It was released on Netflix on March 25, 2025.

== Plot and background ==
In 2020, Graham Hornigold, a London-based chef received an email from Dionne Marie Hanna, a woman claiming to be his biological mother. Hornigold, born in 1974 on a British Army base in Germany and raised by his father and later in foster care, had always yearned to know his mother. Dionne presented herself as a wealthy businesswoman with connections to Southeast Asian royalty, specifically claiming to be an illegitimate daughter of the Sultan of Brunei. She lavished Hornigold, his pregnant partner Heather Kaniuk, and their friends with extravagant gifts, including cars and luxury hotel stays, while promising a multimillion-pound inheritance.

Dionne soon claimed to have terminal brain and bone marrow cancer, intensifying Hornigold’s emotional investment. She began requesting financial assistance, asking Hornigold to cover her bills, including a £25,000 hotel stay, and to take out credit cards and finance agreements in his name, promising repayment from her fortune. Kaniuk grew suspicious and uncovered Dionne’s history of fraud, multiple aliases (including Dionne Marie Hannah and Theresa Haton Mahmud), and prior convictions for shoplifting and deception in 1982. Evidence emerged that Dionne faked her illness, using red food coloring to simulate blood and taking medications unrelated to cancer.

The documentary’s pivotal twist, confirmed by a DNA test, reveals that Dionne is indeed Hornigold’s biological mother, making her betrayal profoundly personal. The scam cost Hornigold £300,000, strained his relationship with Kaniuk (resulting in their separation), and led to significant emotional distress. Dionne disappeared after being confronted, later offering an apology from Malaysia but declining to participate in the film.

The film was produced with interviews featuring Hornigold and Kaniuk, supplemented by archival footage, such as the emotional video of Hornigold’s first meeting with Dionne, and reenactments.

== Reception ==
=== Critical response ===
On the review aggregator website Rotten Tomatoes, critics' reviews were positive.

The Telegraph described it as “breathtakingly depressing,” praising the final twist as a “mouldy cherry on a soggy cake” but criticizing its lack of uplift compared to other scam documentaries.

== Aftermath ==
The release of Con Mum had significant real-world implications. On April 7, 2025, Dionne Marie Hanna, then 84, was charged with fraud in Singapore after alleged victims, inspired by the documentary, filed police reports. Singapore authorities linked her to at least five cases of cheating, with losses exceeding S$200,000 ($149,000). If convicted, Hanna faces up to 20 years in prison and a fine.

On April 24, 2026, Dionne was handed a further 39 charges, with losses involving her case totalling an estimated S$800,000 ($625,000).

In the UK, police declined to pursue charges against Hanna, citing her age, inability to walk, and her maternal relationship with Hornigold, which complicated legal action.
