= Nikki Lilly =

British social media personality

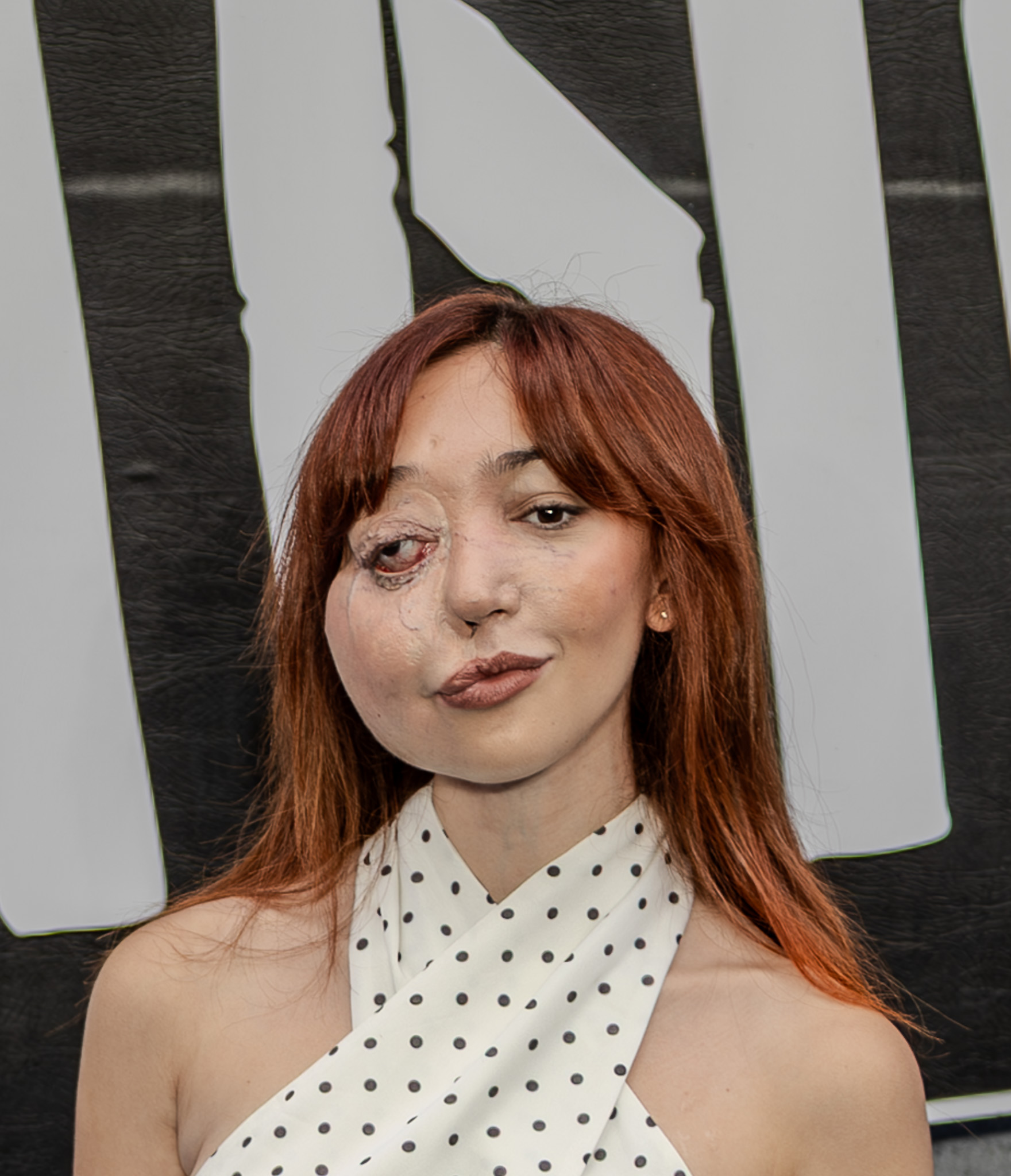
Lilly at the Caught Stealing premiere in London, August 2025

Nicole Lilly Christou (born 22 July 2004; known professionally as Nikki Lilly) is a British charity campaigner, social media personality, model, and television presenter. Christou was awarded the International Emmy Kids Awards in 2019, for her episode of the CBBC series My Life, Nikki Lilly Meets, Nikki Lilly Bakes. She has appeared in Celebrity Supply Teacher doing a lesson on vlogging and is the youngest ever recipient of the BAFTA Special Award. In 2016, Christou received the Child of Courage award at the Pride of Britain Awards.

== Early life ==
Christou is from Enfield, London. She is of Greek Cypriot and Indian descent. At age six, Christou was first diagnosed with arteriovenous malformation (AVM), a rare medical condition that has required treatment with numerous operations, and which has visibly changed her physical appearance. She missed 4 months of primary school and went to the United States multiple times for treatment.

== Media work ==
Christou first became known for her YouTube videos, which she started making at the age of eight, to share her experiences of living with a 'visible difference'. Her YouTube channel covers topics including living with a chronic illness, bullying, mental health, baking and beauty.

Christou has been the subject of two episodes of the CBBC documentary series My Life: Born to Vlog, and I Will Survive. In 2016, Christou won the fourth series of the Junior Bake Off competition, and in 2018 Christou started presenting the CBBC show Nikki Lilly Meets..., in which she interviews politicians and celebrities including tennis player Andy Murray and former Prime Minister Theresa May. For her work on her CBBC show My Life: Born to Blog, she was nominated for a BAFTA award, and won 2018 Emmy Award for Best Factual Program.

At the 2025 TikTok Awards UK & Ireland, she was honored as "Fashion & Beauty Creator of the Year".

== Modeling ==
In May 2025, Christou partnered with L'Oréal to model on the red carpet at the 2025 Cannes Film Festival. In October 2025, she walked the runway at Paris Fashion Week for Matières Fécales' Spring 2026 show. That year, she also modeled for Acne Studios' Spring 2026 show.

== Activism ==
Christou and her parents set up The Butterfly AVM Charity to raise awareness of AVM, raise funds for research into the condition, and to support sufferers and their families.

In 2024 Christou became a patron of Face Equality International, an alliance of Non-Governmental Organisations (NGOs), charities and support groups which are working at national, regional or international levels to promote the campaign for ‘face equality’. In March 2025 Nikki spoke at the United Nation Human Rights Council about her experiences of facial differences.
