= Omelette dress =

Gown designed by Guo Pei and worn by Rihanna

The omelette dress (Note: Also referred to as the Yellow Queen or the Yellow Empress.) is a couture gown designed by Chinese fashion designer Guo Pei and worn by Barbadian singer Rihanna to the Met Gala on May 4, 2015. The gown, which was originally created in 2010, consists of an embroidered canary yellow silk cape and attached train trimmed with fox fur, and weighs approximately 55 pounds (25 kilograms). The gown's appearance at the 2015 Met Gala generated immediate and widespread media coverage.

== Background ==
Guo Pei was born in China in 1967, during the Cultural Revolution. She studied at the Beijing Second Light Industry School and graduated in 1986, later working as a designer at a state-owned garment factory before leaving to establish her own label, Rose Studio, in Beijing in 1997. She built a substantial client base in China's political, celebrity, and social circles over the following two decades, designing costumes for the opening ceremony of the 2008 Beijing Summer Olympics among other major commissions.

The gown, officially named the Yellow Queen, was completed in 2010 — five years before it was worn at the Met Gala. The dress, which took 55,000 hours to complete, was constructed from gold thread and fox fur over an embroidered silk base, with a train that extends almost eighteen feet (five metres) in length. Guo designed the piece with explicit reference to Chinese imperial symbolism: canary yellow was the colour of the emperor in imperial China, associated with the Qin Dynasty and the concept of the Yellow Emperor. The gown weighed 55 pounds (25 kilograms).

== 2015 Met Gala ==
The 2015 Met Gala theme was China: Through the Looking Glass, an exhibition co-organised by Andrew Bolton of the Costume Institute and curated in part around the influence of Chinese aesthetics on Western fashion. Rihanna, in preparing her look for the event, researched Chinese couture online and discovered the omelette dress. Guo Pei confirmed in a subsequent interview that she "didn't know very much" about Rihanna, and was informed only a week or two before the event that the singer would be wearing her design.

Rihanna arrived at the Metropolitan Museum of Art on May 4, 2015, wearing the omelette dress over a silk bra and panty combination, with an entourage of three attendants required to manage the train on the red carpet and the museum's stairs. On the red carpet, she told Vanity Fair: "I'm so in love with this dress, but the train is insane! I can't really walk in it without any help — but it's so worth it. I love this dress so much!" Rihanna later told Dazed that she had felt "like a clown" while wearing the dress, adding that she had almost not attended the event because she felt too overdressed, but ultimately decided to go.

== Reception ==
The gown became a viral internet phenomenon almost immediately after Rihanna's arrival on the red carpet. Social media users likened the circular yellow fur-trimmed train to a fried egg or omelette, and the nickname "omelette dress" (also spelled "omelet dress") became the most widely used popular term for the piece. Other users superimposed pizza imagery onto the circular train. The viral spread of the gown's imagery brought international attention to Guo Pei for the first time. She was subsequently named among Time magazine's Time 100 in 2016. In 2018, New Zealand filmmaker Pietra Brettkelly released a documentary film about Guo Pei titled Yellow Is Forbidden.

== See also ==
- Da Jin
- List of individual dresses
