= Graham Hornigold =

British pastry chef

Graham Hornigold (born 26 November 1974) is a British pastry chef, entrepreneur, and television personality, best known for co-founding the gourmet doughnut brand Longboys, and for his appearances on cooking shows such as MasterChef: The Professionals and Junior Bake Off. Hornigold gained public attention following the 2025 Netflix documentary Con Mum, which detailed his experience of being scammed out of £300,000 by his biological mother, Dionne Marie Hanna.

== Early life and background ==
Graham Hornigold was born on a British Army base in Münster, Germany, to a father in the Royal Engineers and a mother, Theresa Haton Hornigold (later known as Dionne Marie Hanna). At age two, he was placed in foster care for two years for reasons unknown to him, before being raised by his father and stepmother in St. Albans, Hertfordshire, England.

Hornigold has described his childhood as challenging, citing his father’s alleged alcoholism and abuse. He found solace in cooking, beginning his culinary career at 14 with a job at Ushers Bakery in St. Albans, where the owners gifted him his first chef’s knives and supported his enrollment at Watford Catering College.

== Career ==
Hornigold honed his pastry skills under mentors like Lisa Crowe at The Lygon Arms and David Nicholls at the Mandarin Oriental, Hyde Park. At 28, he was appointed executive pastry chef at The Lanesborough Hotel, where his afternoon tea service won the Tea Guild’s Award of Excellence in 2005 and 2008. He was named UK Pastry Chef of the Year in 2007. From 2008 to 2011, he served as chef patissier at the Mandarin Oriental, overseeing the opening of Bar Boulud and assisting with Dinner by Heston Blumenthal. He later joined the Hakkasan Group as executive pastry chef until 2017, managing pastry kitchens for 47 global restaurants and overseeing production of 12,000 macarons weekly.

In 2019, Hornigold and his then-partner Heather Kaniuk founded Longboys, a gourmet finger doughnut brand with locations in London’s Borough Yards, King’s Cross, and Liverpool Street, stocked in Harrods and Selfridges. They also established Smart Patisserie, a pastry consultancy. Hornigold has appeared on MasterChef: The Professionals, Junior Bake Off as a judge, and Top Chef: World All Stars (2022).

== Personal life ==
Hornigold was in a relationship with pastry chef Heather Kaniuk, with whom he has a son born in September 2020. The couple separated in 2021, and Kaniuk relocated to New Zealand with their son. Hornigold maintains a relationship with his son via video calls and plans to visit when financially stable.

In 2020, Hornigold was contacted by Dionne Marie Hanna, who claimed to be his long-lost mother. She deceived him into funding her lavish lifestyle, resulting in £300,000 in debt. A DNA test confirmed Hanna was his biological mother, intensifying the betrayal. The ordeal, detailed in Netflix’s Con Mum (2025), led to significant emotional and financial repercussions, including his separation from Kaniuk. Hornigold has since focused on mental health recovery and continues to run Longboys.

== Awards and nominations ==
- UK Pastry Chef of the Year (2007)
- Tea Guild Best Afternoon Tea (2005, 2008) – The Lanesborough Hotel
