= Da Jin =

Dress designed by Guo Pei

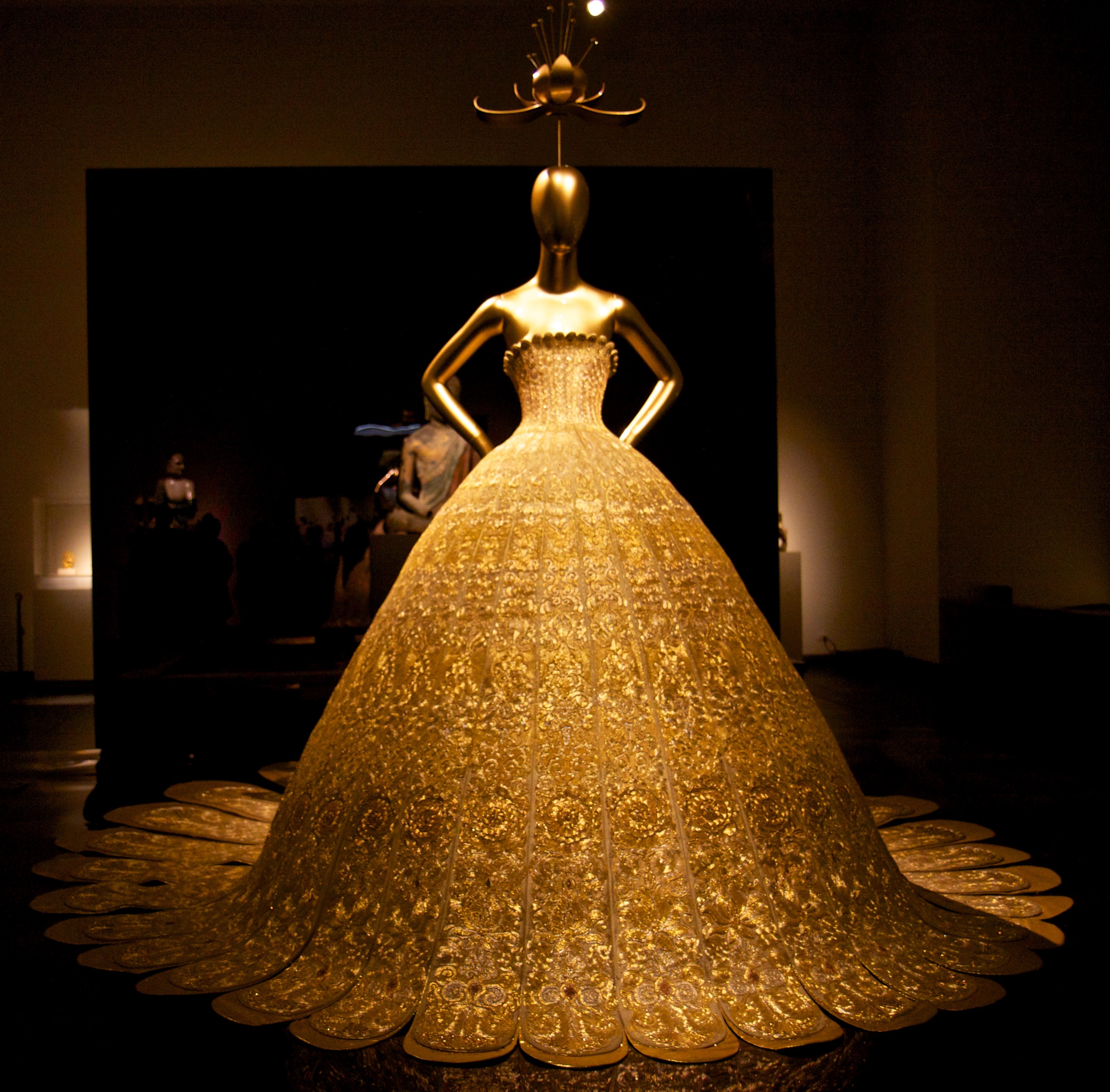
Da Jin in China: Through the Looking Glass exhibition in the Metropolitan Museum of Art

Da Jin (Magnificent Gold) is a gold embroidered dress designed by Chinese fashion designer Guo Pei. The dress was constructed over the course of two years and completed in 2005, with 50,000 hours and 1 million dollars put into the garment. It was her first couture creation and debuted in 2006 as the final dress of her first couture runway show of the Samsara (Life Cycle) collection.

From May 7 to September 7 2015, the public could view the dress in the China: Through the Looking Glass exhibition at the Metropolitan Museum of Art, also part of that year's Met Gala theme. The dress was next exhibited at SCAD FASH Museum of Fashion + Film in the Guo Pei: Couture Beyond solo exhibition from September 7, 2017 to March 4, 2018. It was also displayed at the Guo Pei: Chinese Art & Couture exhibition at the Asian Civilizations Museum in Singapore from June 15th to September 15th of 2019. The Louvre acquired the dress for the Luxes exhibition in the Musée des Arts Décoratifs from October 15th to May 2nd of 2021. Da Jin was featured most recently in the Guo Pei: Couture Fantasy solo exhibition at the Legion of Honor in San Francisco from April 16th to September 5th of 2022.

== Background ==
Guo Pei's atelier Rose Studio was founded in Beijing in 1997. Her inspiration for the Samsara collection, which Da Jin is a part of, widened with her travels to European museums in the early 2000s, such as viewing Napoleonic uniforms in the Musée de l'Armée in Paris. She blended Western silhouettes with Chinese imagery,; the Da Jin paneling described as "like an upturned lotus seed," embroidered with lotus and trailing plants symbolizing exuberance and purity. The collection itself represents a reincarnation of China after the Cultural Revolution, with Da Jin as the sun, since it is reborn each day from darkness. There is a panel for each hour of the day.

== Design ==
Da Jin is constructed of linen and metal coil, embroidered with silk, gold, and silver threads, and is made of linen and metal coil, embroidered with silk, gold, and silver threads, and decorated with sequins. A headdress, choker, and cuff bracelets were constructed to be part of its Samsara collection debut. Materials of these additions included copper, metal, silk cord, and Swarovski crystals.

The dress is large in scale measuring more than 11 1/2 ft long by 9 ft wide, its exhibition at the Legion of Honor requiring 11 people to put it together in the gallery. There is a paneled strapless bodice and paneled bell shaped skirt, with a scallop edge mirrored on the top and bottom of the dress. The panels of the skirt become wider towards the bottom and gradually get longer towards the back, with the dress axially symmetrical from the front or back view.

Guo Pei used Chinese metal thread embroidery techniques on the full surface of the dress, including couching stitch, running stitch, chain stitch, contour embroidery, and beadwork. The gold color comes entirely from the gold thread embroidery.

== Reception ==
Guo Pei considers Da Jin to be the beginning of haute couture for her, declaring "it meant a breakthrough for me, a moment when I found my direction in my 20-year career as a designer." The Samsara collection launched her career in China, where she designed a dress for Song Zuying for the 2008 Beijing Summer Olympics.

== See also ==
- Omelette dress
