= Bobby Love =

American fashion designer

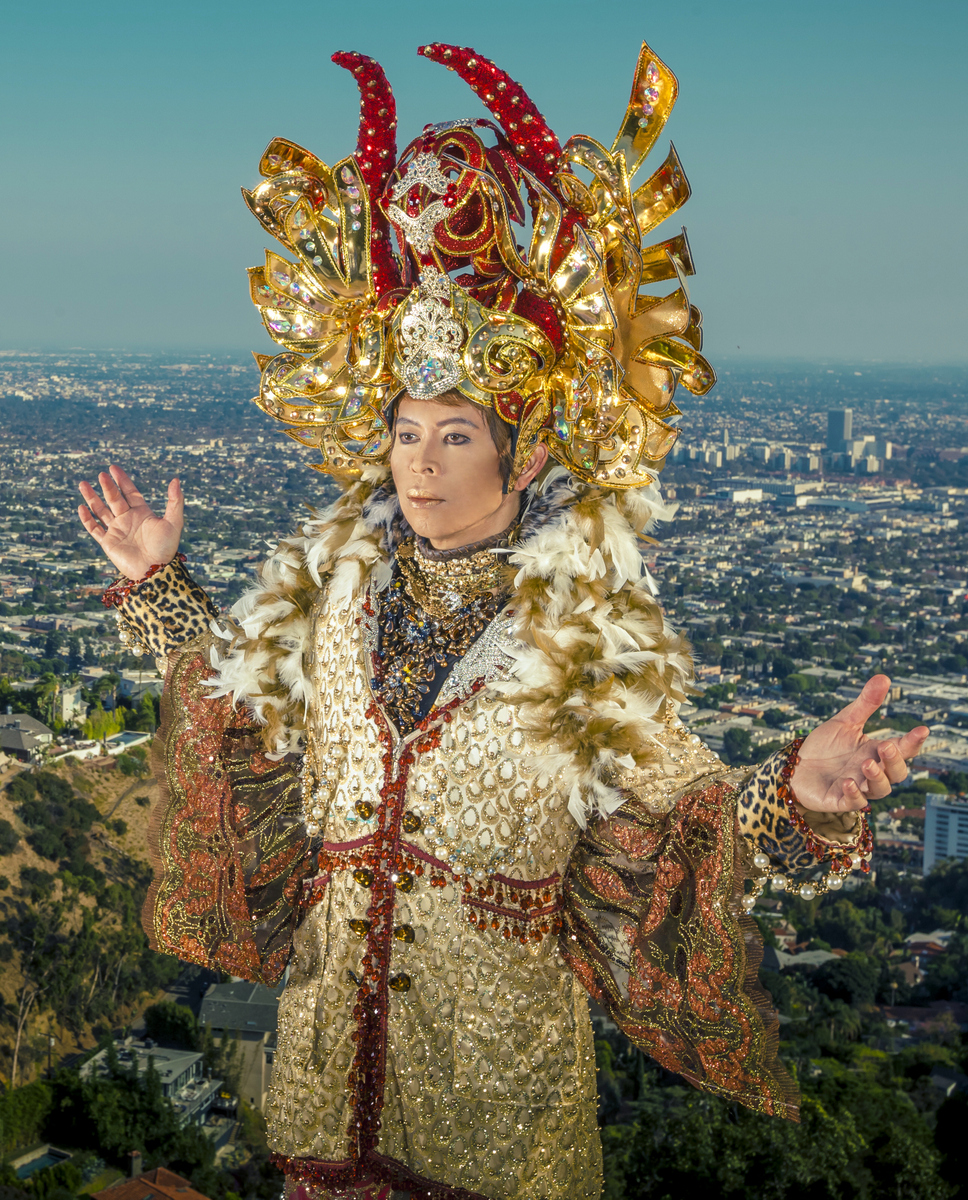
- Born: Hong Kong
- Education: Chapman University, University of Southern California
- Known for: Fashion design
- Style: Fantasy couture
- Website: bobbylove.fashion

Bobby Love is an American fashion designer known primarily for creating designs in the genre known as fantasy couture. Love has identified Salvador Dalí, Alphonse Mucha, and the Art Deco master Erté as major inspirations for his style, and the mechanical parrots which appear in his sets are named "Erté" in his honor.

== Biography ==
Love was born in Hong Kong and grew up in Singapore before moving to the United States to enroll as a student at Chapman University, a private university in Orange, California, at the age of 16. Following this, he earned two master's degrees— one in business administration and another in psychology— from the University of Southern California. His first employment was as a graveyard shift worker at a psychiatric hospital, a job he held for three years.

Love began sketching fashion designs at 14, and became involved in the fashion industry of Hollywood, California after moving there at the age of 20. His designs are usually presented as "suites" that are recorded in professional photographs— these are vignettes including head dresses, costumes, and jewelry that derive from a specific fantasy theme supported by set backgrounds, props, flamboyant costumes, and sometimes other models as well as Mr. Love himself. Love has worn these costumes at fantasy-themed events on the American West Coast, including the Edwardian Ball, Vampire Ball, Labyrinth of Jareth Masquerade Ball, and the Renaissance Pleasure Faire of Southern California, and has changed costumes and props multiple times during some of them. He assembles between 30 and 40 costume suites per year.

His works were featured in the 2016 Avant Garde Magazine runway show, the 2016 and 2018 Los Angeles Fashion Week and Metropolitan Fashion Week events held in Los Angeles, California, and he was given a "Certificate of Recognition" by the mayor of the City of Los Angeles, Eric Garcetti, for his contribution to fashion industry at the 2018 event.

He has appeared twice on the cover of AVANT GARDE Magazine, with the magazine's November 2018 issue being dedicated to him as a "special designer".

Love engages as a designer only as a hobby, and derives no income from it. He curates all of his designs in a private collection with the intent of donating it to American art museums to make them accessible to future designers and artists.

== Gallery ==
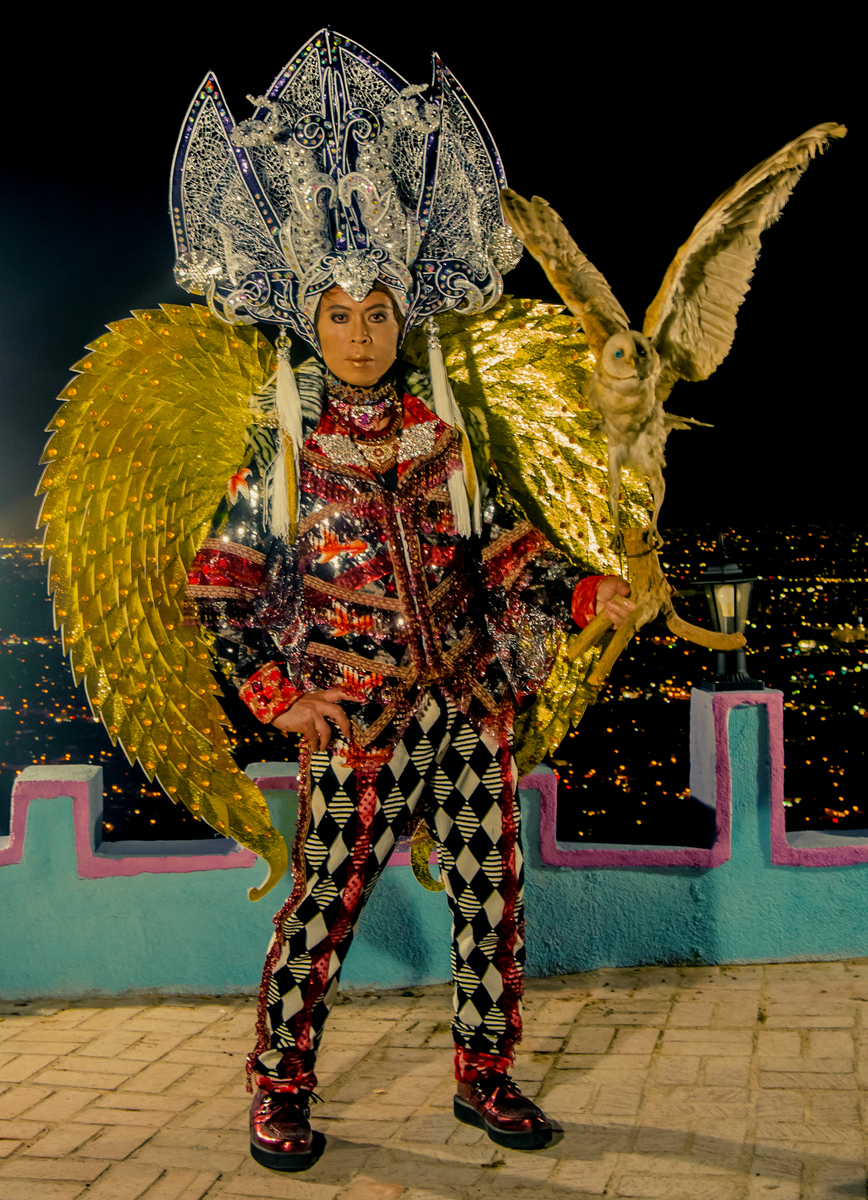

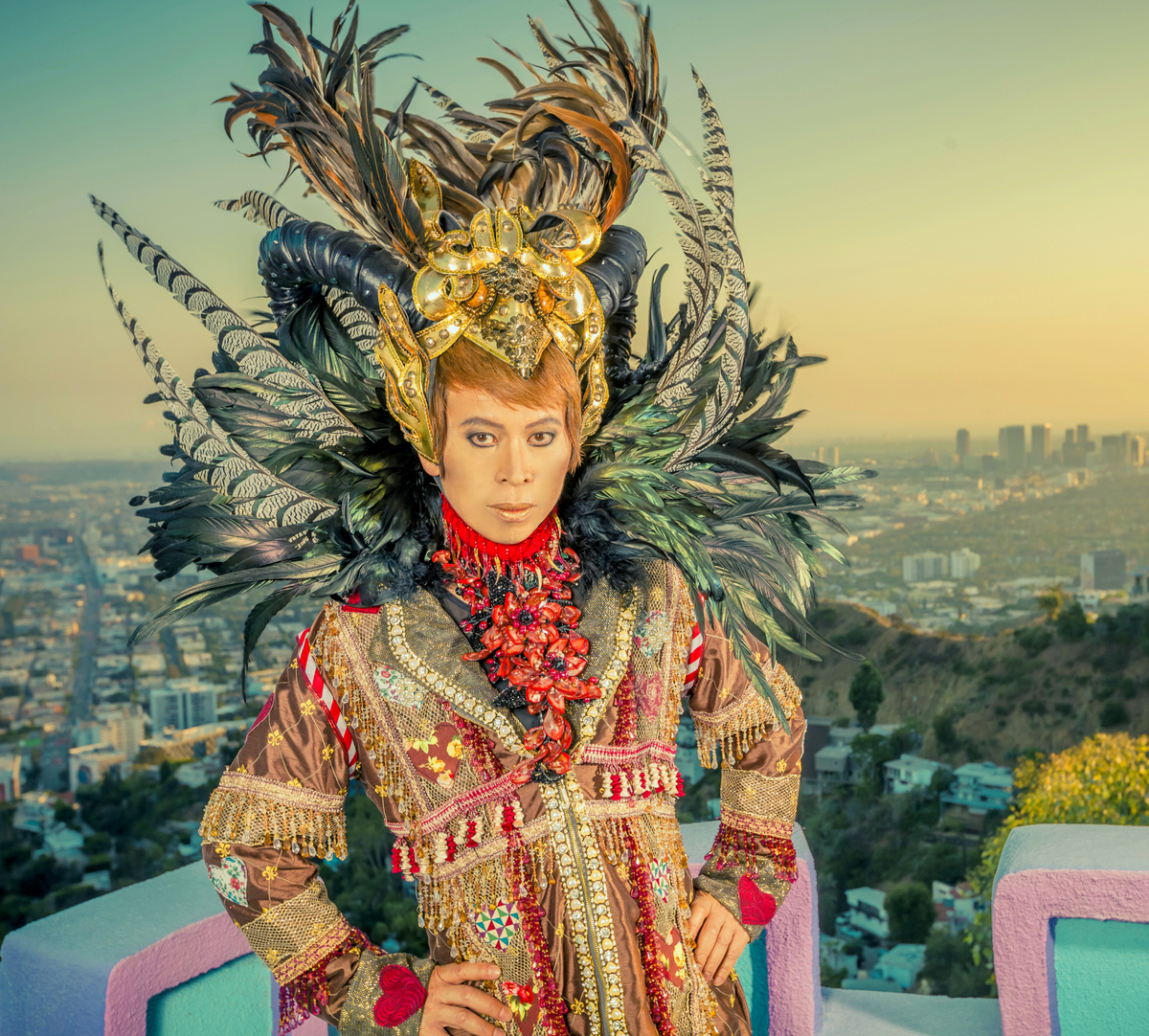

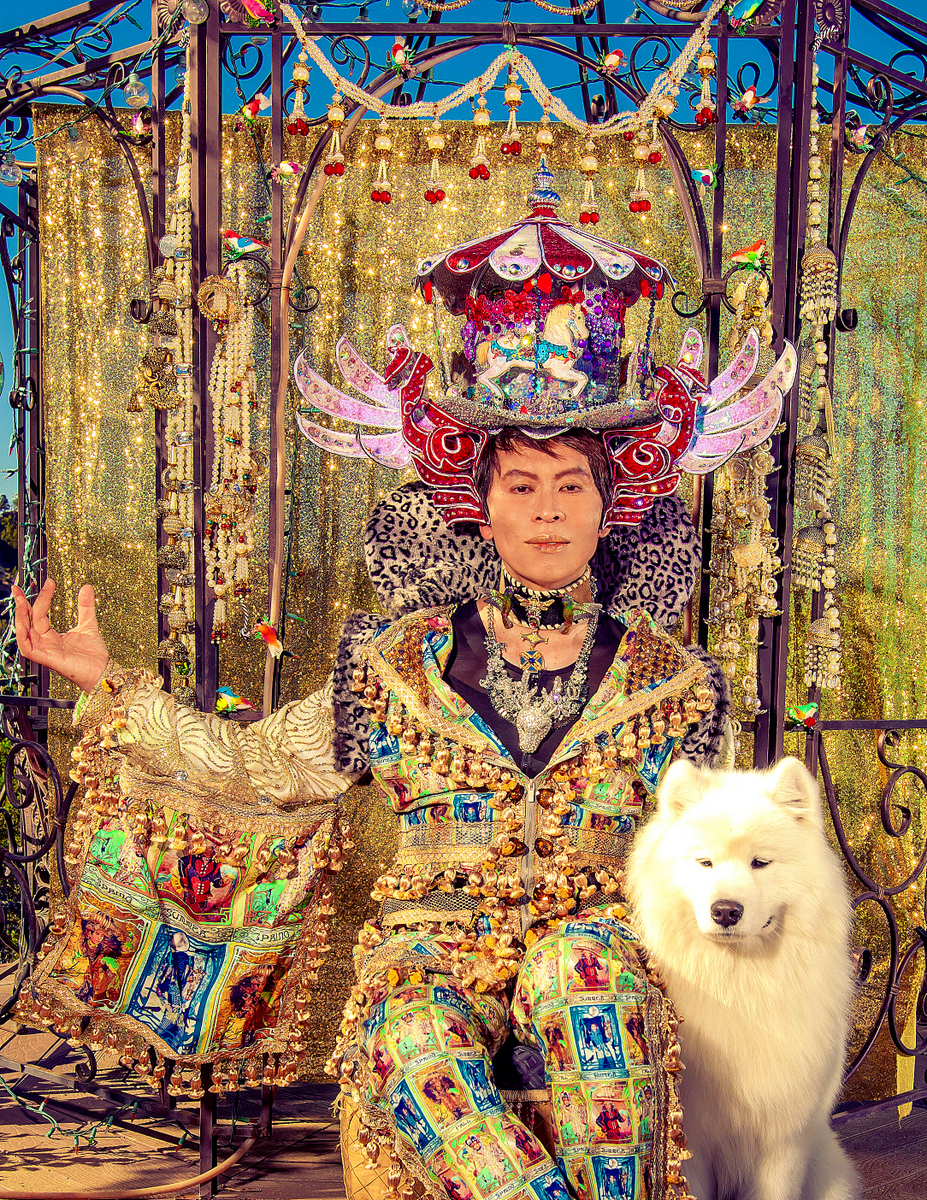
