= Bedfordshire clanger =

English suet turnover

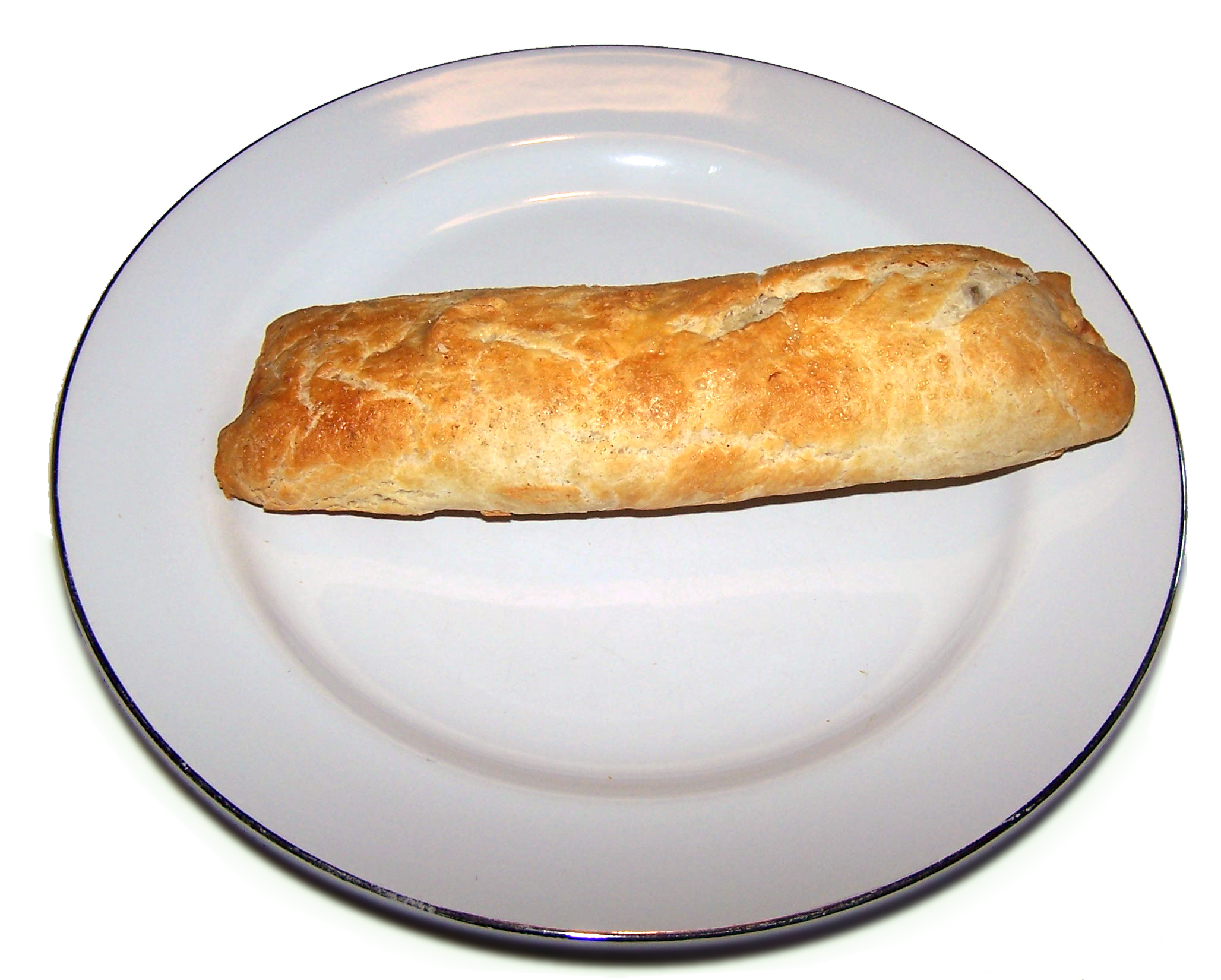
- Alternative names: Hertfordshire clanger, Trowley dumpling
- Type: Boiled suet dumpling (traditional); baked turnover (some modern recipes)
- Place of origin: United Kingdom
- Region or state: South Midlands (Bedfordshire, Buckinghamshire; also Hertfordshire, Cambridgeshire, Huntingdonshire)
- Associated cuisine: English cuisine
- Serving temperature: Hot, or ambient temperature
- Main ingredients: Suet pastry; liver or meat; potatoes; onions; jam or fruit
- Ingredients generally used: Sage
- Similar dishes: Bacon badger (Buckinghamshire); bacon pudding (Sussex)

The Bedfordshire clanger (also called the Hertfordshire clanger, Trowley dumpling, or simply the clanger) is a dish from Bedfordshire and adjacent counties in England, including Buckinghamshire and Hertfordshire. It dates back to at least the 19th century.

The word "clanger" is related to the dialect term "clung", which Joseph Wright glossed as meaning "heavy", in relation to food.

== Description ==
The clanger is an elongated suet crust dumpling, sometimes described as a savoury type of roly-poly pudding. Its name may refer to its dense consistency: Wright's 19th-century English Dialect Dictionary recorded the phrase "clung dumplings" from Bedfordshire, citing "clungy" and "clangy" as adjectives meaning heavy or close-textured.

Clangers were historically made by women for their husbands to take to their agricultural work as a midday meal: it has been suggested that the crust was not originally intended for consumption but to protect the fillings from the soiled hands of the workers. They could be eaten cold, or warmed by being wrapped in damp newspaper under a brazier. While sometimes associated with the hatmakers of the Luton district, the same dish was also recorded in rural Buckinghamshire, Cambridgeshire and Hertfordshire.

== Preparation ==
It was traditionally boiled in a cloth like other suet puddings, though some modern recipes use a shortcrust or other pastry and suggest baking it like a pasty, a method dating from a 1990s revival of the dish by a commercial bakery. The dumpling can be filled with liver and onion, bacon and potatoes, pork and onions, or other meat and vegetables, and flavoured with the garden herb sage.

Usually a savoury dish, clangers were also said to have been prepared with a sweet filling, such as jam or fruit, in one end; this variant is referred to in a Bedfordshire Magazine of the 1960s as an "'alf an' 'alf" (half and half), with "clanger" reserved for a savoury version. A 1959 reference also suggests that clangers were usually savoury, stating that the version with a sweet filling in one end was called the Trowley Dumpling after the hamlet in west Hertfordshire where it was supposed to have originated. There is some doubt as to how often a sweet filling was traditionally added in practice, though modern recipes often imitate the folklore by including one.

== Variations ==
A similar dumpling was known in parts of Buckinghamshire, particularly Aylesbury Vale, as a "Bacon Badger". It was made from bacon, potatoes and onions, flavoured with sage and enclosed in a suet pastry case, and was usually boiled in a cloth. The etymology of "badger" is unknown, but might relate to a former term for a dealer in flour. "Badger" was widely used in the Midland counties in the early 19th century to refer to a "cornfactor, mealman, or huckster". The same basic suet dumpling recipe is known by a variety of other names elsewhere in the country; "flitting pudding" is recorded in County Durham, "dog in blanket" from Derbyshire, and "bacon pudding" in Berkshire and Sussex.

== In popular culture ==
A baked "clanger" featured as a signature bake in episode 8 of Series 8 of The Great British Bake Off.

James Braxton baked a clanger in Season 19 Episode 13 of Antiques Road Trip.

== See also ==
- Pasty
- List of pastries
- List of meat and potato dishes
