= Matières Fécales =

Fashion brand

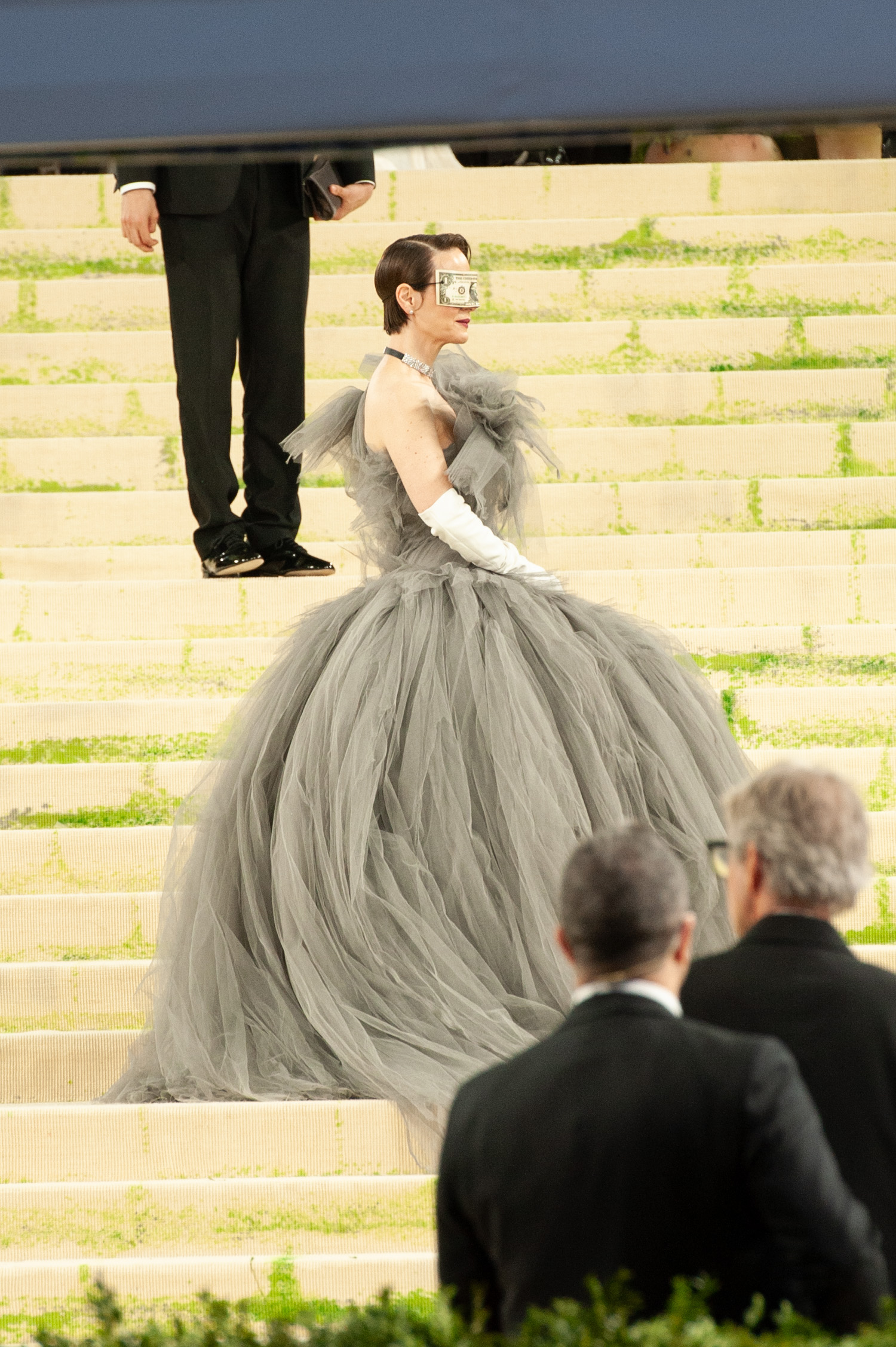
Sarah Paulson at the 2026 Met Gala in a gown from Matières Fécales Fall/Winter 2026 collection

Matières Fécales (meaning "fecal matter" in French) is a high-end avant-garde fashion-house, founded by Hannah Rose Dalton and Steven Raj Bhaskaran in Montreal, in 2014. The label came to prominence in 2026, during that year's Paris Fashion Week.

== History ==
Dalton cited her inspiration to enter the industry when the Rana Plaza factory in Bangladesh collapsed in 2013, to "protest against the non-glamorous side of fashion". Bhaskaran's background drawing manga led to his pivot to sketching fashion designs. The two began working together and began a personal relationship soon after they met as fashion students at LaSalle College in Montreal. While Dalton was born in New Zealand and Bhaskaran in Guyana, both grew up in Canada.

Dalton and Bhaskaran launched their label in 2014, naming it after fecal matter to reference the "toxic excesses of fashion" and ironically describe the durability of their clothes. They told reporters this would ensure that customers chose their product for its quality rather than the name on the label.

After producing a small collection for Selfridges in London in 2019, the brand paired with Dover Street Market for its Spring 2025 Paris Fashion Week show. The brand's "post-human aesthetic" included unconventional features such as models with shaved heads and eyebrows, and references to aliens as well as alienation. The brand has been known for skin-covered stiletto heels and blazers with markedly pointed shoulders. Influencer Nikki Lilly walked the runway in the Matières Fécales show during Paris Fashion Week in October 2025.

In 2026, Lady Gaga wore a black feathered Matières Fécales gown to the 68th Annual Grammy Awards, and Demi Moore attended the 2026 Cannes Film Festival in a hot pink ballgown with a "decomposing hem" from the label. At the 2026 Met Gala, Sarah Paulson appeared in a shredded gray tulle ballgown, styled with white leather opera gloves and a "money mask" covering her eyes; María Zardoya wore a pink drop-waist dress with padded hips and accessorized with a "haunted doll purse."
