= Junior Bake Off =

Television baking competition series

- Genre: Baking; Reality
- Directed by: Nicholas Berry
- Presented by: Aaron Craze; Sam Nixon; Mark Rhodes; Harry Hill
- Judges: Paul Hollywood; James Martin; Mary Berry; Allegra McEvedy; Graham Hornigold; Nadiya Hussain; Liam Charles; Prue Leith; Ravneet Gill
- Country of origin: United Kingdom
- Original language: English
- No. of series: 11
- No. of episodes: 163 (and 8 specials)

Production
- Production location: Cobham Hall
- Running time: 28 minutes (2011–2016); 60 minutes (2019–)
- Production company: Love Productions

Original release
- Network: CBBC (2011–2016); Channel 4 (2019–)
- Release: 31 October 2011 – present

Related
- The Great British Bake Off

Junior Bake Off (titled Junior Baking Show in the United States and Canada) is a British television baking competition in which young bakers aged 9 to 15 tackle a series of challenges involving baking cakes, biscuits, bread, and pastries, competing to be crowned Junior Bake Off Champion.

The series debuted in the year 2011 as a spin-off from The Great British Bake Off and is also produced by Love Productions. Four series of Junior Bake Off were broadcast on CBBC from 2011 to 2016. Following its parent series' departure from the BBC in 2017, Junior Bake Off resumed with a fifth series on 4 November 2019 on Channel 4, with comedian Harry Hill as presenter and Prue Leith and Liam Charles as judges. The fifth series concluded on 22 November 2019. The show returned for a sixth series on 11 January 2021, with Ravneet Gill replacing Prue Leith. The sixth series concluded on 29 January 2021. A seventh series premiered on 10 January 2022 and concluded on 28 January 2022. On 16 January 2026, it was announced that Junior Bake Off was renewed for its twelfth series to air in 2027.

== Format ==
Each series of Junior Bake Off typically includes 15 episodes. While The Great British Bake Off features three challenges per episode (signature, technical, and showstopper), Junior Bake Off includes only the technical and showstopper challenges. In the first four series, aired on CBBC from 2011 to 2016, the format featured 40 young bakers aged 9 to 12 years old divided into 10 qualifying rounds or heats. Each episode featured only four bakers, with one winner each episode and the other three eliminated. The winning bakers from each heat were brought back for "Finals Week", consisting of two semi-finals followed by two finals, and then one grand final to determine the winner.

The format was altered in 2019 when the series moved to Channel 4. The episodes were increased from 30 minutes to one hour, the number of bakers halved to 20 (16 starting in series 6). Instead of only four bakers taking part in each qualifying round, the bakers were divided into two groups of 10 each, with five eliminated from one group during the first five episodes, and five eliminated from the second group during the second five episodes. The remaining five bakers from each group are combined in finals week, with two quarterfinals, two semifinals and a final. The upper age range of the contestants was increased from 12 to 15 in 2019, then changed back to 12 in series 8 through 10. The "Star Baker" award, given to the judges' favourite baker in each episode, was not included in the CBBC version of the show but is a part of the Channel 4 format.

== Series overview ==
| Series | Eps. | Premiere | Finale | Winner | Finalists | Channel |
|---|---|---|---|---|---|---|
| 1 | 13 | 31 October 2011 | 17 November 2011 | Freya Watson | Kai | CBBC |
| 1 | 13 | 31 October 2011 | 17 November 2011 | Freya Watson | Kieran | CBBC |
| 1 | 13 | 31 October 2011 | 17 November 2011 | Freya Watson | Saffron | CBBC |
| 2 | 13 | 11 November 2013 | 29 November 2013 | Harry Duffy | Emma | CBBC |
| 2 | 13 | 11 November 2013 | 29 November 2013 | Harry Duffy | Ruby | CBBC |
| 2 | 13 | 11 November 2013 | 29 November 2013 | Harry Duffy | Zainab | CBBC |
| 3 | 15 | 2 November 2015 | 20 November 2015 | Amari Koryang | Alyth | CBBC |
| 3 | 15 | 2 November 2015 | 20 November 2015 | Amari Koryang | Euan | CBBC |
| 3 | 15 | 2 November 2015 | 20 November 2015 | Amari Koryang | Megan | CBBC |
| 4 | 15 | 7 November 2016 | 25 November 2016 | Nikki Lilly | Macy | CBBC |
| 4 | 15 | 7 November 2016 | 25 November 2016 | Nikki Lilly | Tyrese | CBBC |
| 5 | 15 | 4 November 2019 | 22 November 2019 | Fin Woodward | Aleena | Channel 4 |
| 5 | 15 | 4 November 2019 | 22 November 2019 | Fin Woodward | Amal | Channel 4 |
| 5 | 15 | 4 November 2019 | 22 November 2019 | Fin Woodward | Eliza | Channel 4 |
| 6 | 15 | 11 January 2021 | 29 January 2021 | Reece Suwali | Robbie | Channel 4 |
| 6 | 15 | 11 January 2021 | 29 January 2021 | Reece Suwali | Naima | Channel 4 |
| 6 | 15 | 11 January 2021 | 29 January 2021 | Reece Suwali | Cece | Channel 4 |
| 7 | 15 | 10 January 2022 | 28 January 2022 | Kezia | Lola | Channel 4 |
| 7 | 15 | 10 January 2022 | 28 January 2022 | Kezia | Aisya | Channel 4 |
| 7 | 15 | 10 January 2022 | 28 January 2022 | Kezia | Fraser | Channel 4 |
| 8 | 15 | 16 January 2023 | 3 February 2023 | Amelia | Thomas | Channel 4 |
| 8 | 15 | 16 January 2023 | 3 February 2023 | Amelia | Annabel | Channel 4 |
| 8 | 15 | 16 January 2023 | 3 February 2023 | Amelia | Mya | Channel 4 |
| 9 | 15 | 2 January 2024 | 19 January 2024 | Tilly | Annabelle | Channel 4 |
| 9 | 15 | 2 January 2024 | 19 January 2024 | Tilly | Ilham | Channel 4 |
| 9 | 15 | 2 January 2024 | 19 January 2024 | Tilly | Max | Channel 4 |
| 10 | 15 | 6 January 2025 | 24 January 2025 | Austin Edwards | Lola | Channel 4 |
| 10 | 15 | 6 January 2025 | 24 January 2025 | Austin Edwards | Ronnie | Channel 4 |
| 10 | 15 | 6 January 2025 | 24 January 2025 | Austin Edwards | Deji | Channel 4 |
| 11 | 15 | 5 January 2026 | 23 January 2026 | Aiyla L | Kitto | Channel 4 |
| 11 | 15 | 5 January 2026 | 23 January 2026 | Aiyla L | Miko | Channel 4 |
| 11 | 15 | 5 January 2026 | 23 January 2026 | Aiyla L | Umayr | Channel 4 |

=== Presenters and judges ===
| Series | Presenters | Judges | |
|---|---|---|---|
| 1 | Aaron Craze | Paul Hollywood | Mary Berry |
| 2 | Aaron Craze | James Martin | Mary Berry |
| 3 | Sam Nixon & Mark Rhodes | Allegra McEvedy | Graham Hornigold |
| 4 | Sam Nixon & Mark Rhodes | Allegra McEvedy | Nadiya Hussain |
| 5 | Harry Hill | Liam Charles | Prue Leith |
| 6 | Harry Hill | Liam Charles | Ravneet Gill |
| 7 | Harry Hill | Liam Charles | Ravneet Gill |
| 8 | Harry Hill | Liam Charles | Ravneet Gill |
| 9 | Harry Hill | Liam Charles | Ravneet Gill |
| 10 | Harry Hill | Liam Charles | Ravneet Gill |
| 11 | Harry Hill | Liam Charles | Ravneet Gill |

== Series 1 (2011) ==
The first series began on 31 October 2011 on CBBC with judges from the main show Paul Hollywood and Mary Berry. Aaron Craze presented the show.

Heat AAirdate: 31 October 2011
| Baker | Age | Hometown | Result |
|---|---|---|---|
| Amari | 11 | North London | Eliminated |
| Joe | 9 | West Sussex | Top 8 |
| Joy | 12 | Glasgow | Eliminated |
| Marie | 11 | Southampton | Eliminated |

Heat BAirdate: 1 November 2011
| Baker | Age | Hometown | Result |
|---|---|---|---|
| Millie | 11 | York | Eliminated |
| Saffron | 10 | Essex | Top 8 |
| Sam | 11 | Cheshire | Eliminated |
| Stanley | 12 | Brighton | Eliminated |

Heat CAirdate: 2 November 2011
| Baker | Age | Hometown | Result |
|---|---|---|---|
| Hari | 9 | Birmingham | Eliminated |
| Holly | 12 | Oxford | Eliminated |
| Kieran | 12 | York | Top 8 |
| Sylvia | 11 | Bristol | Eliminated |

Heat DAirdate: 3 November 2011
| Baker | Age | Hometown | Result |
|---|---|---|---|
| Alex | 11 | Northampton | Eliminated |
| Cameron | 12 | Sheffield | Top 8 |
| Ellie | 10 | Edinburgh | Eliminated |
| Zyta | 12 | Aylesbury | Eliminated |

Heat EAirdate: 7 November 2011
| Baker | Age | Hometown | Result |
|---|---|---|---|
| Galway | 12 | Sutton Coldfield | Eliminated |
| Jim | 11 | West Sussex | Eliminated |
| Sangita | 12 | Bradford | Top 8 |
| Scott | 11 | Kent | Eliminated |

Heat FAirdate: 8 November 2011
| Baker | Age | Hometown | Result |
|---|---|---|---|
| Abigail | 11 | Rowley Regis | Eliminated |
| Kai | 12 | Wirral | Top 8 |
| Olivia | 12 | Pontypridd | Eliminated |
| Sami | 11 | Leicester | Eliminated |

Heat GAirdate: 9 November 2011
| Baker | Age | Hometown | Result |
|---|---|---|---|
| Coco-Nina | 11 | Bath | Eliminated |
| Conal | 11 | Cambridge | Eliminated |
| Jacob | 12 | Herefordshire | Top 8 |
| Katie | 9 | County Fermanagh | Eliminated |

Heat HAirdate: 10 November 2011
| Baker | Age | Hometown | Result |
|---|---|---|---|
| Aasiya | 11 | Hertfordshire | Eliminated |
| Cameron Stott | 7 | Derbyshire | Eliminated |
| Freya Watson | 10 | Newbury | Top 8 |
| Sam | 10 | Somerset | Eliminated |

Top 8 semi-finals AAirdate: 14 November 2011
| Baker | Age | Hometown | Result |
|---|---|---|---|
| Cameron | 12 | Sheffield | Eliminated |
| Joe | 9 | West Sussex | Eliminated |
| Kieran | 12 | York | Top 4 |
| Saffron | 10 | Essex | Top 4 |

Top 8 semi-finals BAirdate: 15 November 2011
| Baker | Age | Hometown | Result |
|---|---|---|---|
| Freya Watson | 10 | Newbury | Top 4 |
| Jacob | 12 | Herefordshire | Eliminated |
| Kai | 12 | Wirral | Top 4 |
| Sangita | 12 | Bradford | Eliminated |

Top 4 finalsAirdate: 17 November 2011
| Baker | Age | Hometown | Result |
|---|---|---|---|
| Freya Watson | 10 | Newbury | Won |
| Kai | 12 | Wirral | Runner-up |
| Kieran | 12 | York | Runner-up |
| Saffron | 10 | Essex | Runner-up |

== Series 2 (2013) ==
A second series began on 11 November 2013 on CBBC. Chef James Martin replaced Hollywood as judge.

Heat AAirdate: 11 November 2013
| Baker | Age | Hometown | Result |
|---|---|---|---|
| Alexandre | 12 | Hertfordshire | Eliminated |
| Anna | 11 | Kent | Eliminated |
| Brinta | 12 | London | Eliminated |
| Griffin | 11 | Wrexham, North Wales | Top 10 |

Heat BAirdate: 12 November 2013
| Baker | Age | Hometown | Result |
|---|---|---|---|
| Ann | 12 | Bristol | Eliminated |
| Ben | 11 | Wales | Eliminated |
| Ellie | 11 | Edinburgh | Top 10 |
| Finn | 10 | North Yorkshire | Eliminated |

Heat CAirdate: 13 November 2013
| Baker | Age | Hometown | Result |
|---|---|---|---|
| Ben | 10 | North Yorkshire | Eliminated |
| Emma | 11 | Pembrokeshire, Wales | Top 10 |
| George | 11 | Shropshire | Eliminated |
| Megan | 11 | Midlands | Eliminated |

Heat DAirdate: 14 November 2013
| Baker | Age | Hometown | Result |
|---|---|---|---|
| Charlie | 10 | Northampton | Eliminated |
| Ellie | 10 | Manchester | Eliminated |
| Joseph | 10 | Oldham | Eliminated |
| Ruby | 11 | Devon | Top 10 |

Heat EAirdate: 15 November 2013
| Baker | Age | Hometown | Result |
|---|---|---|---|
| Abhimanyu | 11 | Warwickshire | Eliminated |
| Alex | 10 | Lincolnshire | Eliminated |
| Emily | 12 | South Lanarkshire | Top 10 |
| Jojo | 11 | London | Eliminated |

Heat FAirdate: 18 November 2013
| Baker | Age | Hometown | Result |
|---|---|---|---|
| Cameron | 12 | Kent | Eliminated |
| Elizabeth | 11 | Bristol | Eliminated |
| Katie | 11 | Belfast | Eliminated |
| Monty | 12 | Cheshire | Top 10 |

Heat GAirdate: 19 November 2013
| Baker | Age | Hometown | Result |
|---|---|---|---|
| Aaminah | 12 | Middlesex | Eliminated |
| Alfie | 10 | Norfolk | Eliminated |
| Archie | 11 | County Down, Northern Ireland | Top 10 |
| Esther | 9 | Cheshire | Eliminated |

Heat HAirdate: 20 November 2013
| Baker | Age | Hometown | Result |
|---|---|---|---|
| Harrison | 12 | East Sussex | Eliminated |
| Harry Duffy | 10 | Hampshire | Top 10 |
| Isabelle | 12 | Lancashire | Eliminated |
| Rosie | 11 | Essex | Eliminated |

Heat IAirdate: 21 November 2013
| Baker | Age | Hometown | Result |
|---|---|---|---|
| Charlie | 11 | Norfolk | Eliminated |
| Louis | 10 | Cambridge | Eliminated |
| Ruby | 12 | Cheshire | Eliminated |
| Zainab | 10 | Hertfordshire | Top 10 |

Heat JAirdate: 22 November 2013
| Baker | Age | Hometown | Result |
|---|---|---|---|
| James | 11 | Coventry | Eliminated |
| Kavern | 9 | London | Top 10 |
| Lily-Grace | 12 | Middlesex | Eliminated |
| Missy | 11 | Birmingham | Eliminated |

Top 10 semi-finals AAirdate: 25 November 2013
| Baker | Age | Hometown | Result |
|---|---|---|---|
| Ellie | 11 | Edinburgh | Eliminated |
| Emily | 12 | South Lanarkshire | Eliminated |
| Emma | 11 | Pembrokeshire, Wales | Top 4 |
| Griffin | 11 | Wrexham, North Wales | Eliminated |
| Ruby | 11 | Devon | Top 4 |

Top 10 semi-finals BAirdate: 26 November 2013
| Baker | Age | Hometown | Result |
|---|---|---|---|
| Archie | 11 | County Down, Northern Ireland | Eliminated |
| Harry Duffy | 10 | Hampshire | Top 4 |
| Kavern | 9 | London | Eliminated |
| Monty | 12 | Cheshire | Eliminated |
| Zainab | 10 | Hertfordshire | Top 4 |

Top 4 finalsAirdate: 26 November 2013
| Baker | Age | Hometown | Result |
|---|---|---|---|
| Harry Duffy | 10 | Hampshire | Won |
| Emma | 11 | Pembrokeshire, Wales | Runner-up |
| Ruby | 11 | Devon | Runner-up |
| Zainab | 10 | Hertfordshire | Runner-up |

== Series 3 (2015) ==
A third series began airing on 2 November 2015 on CBBC, with Sam Nixon and Mark Rhodes replacing Craze as hosts. Allegra McEvedy and Graham Hornigold took over from Berry and Martin as judges.

Heat AAirdate: 2 November 2015
| Baker | Age | Hometown | Result |
|---|---|---|---|
| Alyth | 11 | Lanarkshire, Scotland | Top 10 |
| Harrison Brown | 10 | Worcestershire | Eliminated |
| Kiah | 11 | London | Eliminated |
| Matthew | 9 | Derbyshire | Eliminated |

Heat BAirdate: 3 November 2015
| Baker | Age | Hometown | Result |
|---|---|---|---|
| Farhaan | 10 | London | Eliminated |
| Hannah | 11 | Conwy, North Wales | Eliminated |
| Olivia Millburn | 10 | Northumberland | Top 10 |
| Tom | 12 | London | Eliminated |

Heat CAirdate: 4 November 2015
| Baker | Age | Hometown | Result |
|---|---|---|---|
| Grainne | 12 | Belfast | Eliminated |
| Isaac Greenhill | 11 | York | Top 10 |
| Matilda | 10 | Surrey | Eliminated |
| Will | 11 | Hertfordshire | Eliminated |

Heat DAirdate: 5 November 2015
| Baker | Age | Hometown | Result |
|---|---|---|---|
| Euan Buckley | 12 | West Lothian | Top 10 |
| Lucy | 11 | Kent | Eliminated |
| Peter | 10 | Sheffield | Eliminated |
| Sienna | 11 | Stratford-upon-Avon | Eliminated |

Heat EAirdate: 6 November 2015
| Baker | Age | Hometown | Result |
|---|---|---|---|
| Alex | 12 | Manchester | Eliminated |
| Hafsa | 12 | Wembley | Eliminated |
| James | 12 | Gosport | Eliminated |
| Megan Lewis | 12 | Rhondda Valley | Top 10 |

Heat FAirdate: 9 November 2015
| Baker | Age | Hometown | Result |
|---|---|---|---|
| Alice | 11 | Dorset | Top 10 |
| Corey | 11 | Forth Valley | Eliminated |
| Finlay | 10 | Northumberland | Eliminated |
| Sufia | 10 | West Yorkshire | Eliminated |

Heat GAirdate: 10 November 2015
| Baker | Age | Hometown | Result |
|---|---|---|---|
| Alfie | 11 | Swindon | Eliminated |
| Andrea | 10 | Middlesex | Eliminated |
| Freddie Patmore | 12 | Newcastle | Top 10 |
| Lucy | 12 | Liverpool | Eliminated |

Heat HAirdate: 11 November 2015
| Baker | Age | Hometown | Result |
|---|---|---|---|
| Ben | 12 | Sutton Coldfield | Eliminated |
| Darcey Harkness | 12 | Belfast | Top 10 |
| Isabel | 11 | Hove | Eliminated |
| Will | 9 | Cardiff | Eliminated |

Heat IAirdate: 12 November 2015
| Baker | Age | Hometown | Result |
|---|---|---|---|
| Amari Koryang | 11 | Birmingham | Top 10 |
| Ben | 12 | Leeds | Eliminated |
| Khushi | 10 | Hertfordshire | Eliminated |
| Oscar | 9 | Maidenhead | Eliminated |

Heat JAirdate: 13 November 2015
| Baker | Age | Hometown | Result |
|---|---|---|---|
| Ben | 10 | Tyne and Wear | Eliminated |
| Grace | 11 | Oxfordshire | Eliminated |
| Purdey Burton | 12 | London | Top 10 |
| Tom | 11 | East Sussex | Eliminated |

Top 10 quarterfinals AAirdate: 16 November 2015
| Baker | Age | Hometown | Result |
|---|---|---|---|
| Alyth | 11 | Lanarkshire, Scotland | Top 6 |
| Darcey | 12 | Belfast | Eliminated |
| Euan | 12 | West Lothian | Top 6 |
| Freddie | 12 | Newcastle | Top 6 |
| Olivia | 10 | Northumberland | Eliminated |

Top 10 quarterfinals BAirdate: 17 November 2015
| Baker | Age | Hometown | Result |
|---|---|---|---|
| Alice | 11 | Dorset | Top 6 |
| Amari Koryang | 11 | Birmingham | Top 6 |
| Isaac | 11 | York | Eliminated |
| Megan | 12 | Rhondda Valley | Top 6 |
| Purdey | 12 | London | Eliminated |

Top 6 semifinalsAirdate: 18 November 2015FinalsAirdate: 19–20 November 2015
| Baker | Age | Hometown | Result |
|---|---|---|---|
| Amari Koryang | 11 | Birmingham | Won |
| Alyth | 11 | Lanarkshire, Scotland | Runner-up |
| Euan | 12 | West Lothian | Runner-up |
| Megan | 12 | Rhondda Valley | Runner-up |
| Alice | 11 | Dorset | Eliminated |
| Freddie | 12 | Newcastle | Eliminated |

Viewership ratings for series three (2015)
| Episode No. | Airdate | Total viewers | CBBC Channel Weekly Ranking |
|---|---|---|---|
| 1 | 2 November 2015 | 677,000 | 1 |
| 2 | 3 November 2015 | 662,000 | 2 |
| 3 | 4 November 2015 | 658,000 | 5 |
| 4 | 5 November 2015 | 672,000 | 4 |
| 5 | 6 November 2015 | 673,000 | 1 |
| 6 | 9 November 2015 | 647,000 | 5 |
| 7 | 10 November 2015 | 632,000 | 2 |
| 8 | 11 November 2015 | 658,000 | 2 |
| 9 | 12 November 2015 | 660,000 | 9 |
| 10 | 13 November 2015 | 671,000 | 6 |
| 11 | 16 November 2015 | 668,000 | 8 |
| 12 | 17 November 2015 | 672,000 | 4 |
| 13 | 18 November 2015 | 673,000 | 1 |
| 14 | 19 November 2015 | 669,000 | 2 |
| 15 | 20 November 2015 | 678,000 | 1 |

== Series 4 (2016) ==
The fourth series began on 7 November 2016 on CBBC. Allegra McEvedy returns as judge with Nadiya Hussain replacing Graham Hornigold. Presenters Sam & Mark returned to host.

Heat AAirdate: 7 November 2016
| Baker | Age | Hometown | Result |
|---|---|---|---|
| Abi | 11 | Perthshire | Eliminated |
| Annabel | 9 | Norfolk | Eliminated |
| Harry | 12 | Hampshire | Eliminated |
| Tyrese | 11 | London | Top 10 |

Heat BAirdate: 8 November 2016
| Baker | Age | Hometown | Result |
|---|---|---|---|
| Billy | 12 | Wiltshire | Eliminated |
| Evie | 11 | Leicestershire | Top 10 |
| Nigel | 10 | Northamptonshire | Eliminated |
| Shriyana | 11 | Swansea | Eliminated |

Heat CAirdate: 9 November 2016
| Baker | Age | Hometown | Result |
|---|---|---|---|
| Ben Wiser | 11 | Shropshire | Eliminated |
| Francesca | 11 | Middlesex | Top 10 |
| Hannah | 10 | Birmingham | Eliminated |
| Oliver | 11 | Staffordshire | Eliminated |

Heat DAirdate: 10 November 2016
| Baker | Age | Hometown | Result |
|---|---|---|---|
| Mack | 10 | Cardiff | Eliminated |
| Millie | 11 | Swindon | Eliminated |
| Rosie | 11 | West Midlands | Eliminated |
| Zac | 11 | London | Top 10 |

Heat EAirdate: 11 November 2016
| Baker | Age | Hometown | Result |
|---|---|---|---|
| Elodie | 9 | Buckinghamshire | Eliminated |
| Hamish | 10 | Edinburgh | Eliminated |
| Nikki Lilly | 12 | London | Top 10 |
| Ollie | 11 | Somerset | Eliminated |

Heat FAirdate: 14 November 2016
| Baker | Age | Hometown | Result |
|---|---|---|---|
| Dylan | 10 | Sussex | Eliminated |
| Ali | 11 | Birmingham | Eliminated |
| Jenna Ghattaora | 11 | Nottingham | Top 10 |
| Robin | 11 | Scottish Borders | Eliminated |

Heat GAirdate: 15 November 2016
| Baker | Age | Hometown | Result |
|---|---|---|---|
| Jamie | 9 | Doncaster | Eliminated |
| JJ | 11 | Tyne and Wear | Eliminated |
| Maisie | 12 | Swindom | Top 10 |
| Mia | 10 | Belfast | Eliminated |

Heat HAirdate: 16 November 2016
| Baker | Age | Hometown | Result |
|---|---|---|---|
| Ffion | 10 | Gwynedd | Eliminated |
| Harry | 10 | Bristol | Eliminated |
| Lottie Pottinger | 12 | Cheshire | Top 10 |
| Mehdi | 12 | London | Eliminated |

Heat IAirdate: 17 November 2016
| Baker | Age | Hometown | Result |
|---|---|---|---|
| Harvey | 12 | Essex | Eliminated |
| Joseph | 12 | Grimsby | Eliminated |
| Macy Braithwaite | 12 | Coventry | Top 10 |
| Sophie | 10 | Merseyside | Eliminated |

Heat JAirdate: 18 November 2016
| Baker | Age | Hometown | Result |
|---|---|---|---|
| Mimi | 11 | London | Eliminated |
| Rachel | 12 | Solihull | Top 10 |
| Tom | 12 | Surrey | Eliminated |
| Yasmin | 9 | Kent | Eliminated |

Top 10 quarterfinals AAirdate: 21 November 2016
| Baker | Age | Hometown | Result |
|---|---|---|---|
| Evie | 11 | Leicestershire | Eliminated |
| Francesca | 11 | Middlesex | Top 6 |
| Nikki Lilly | 12 | London | Top 6 |
| Tyrese | 11 | London | Top 6 |
| Zac | 11 | London | Eliminated |

Top 10 quarterfinals BAirdate: 22 November 2016
| Baker | Age | Hometown | Result |
|---|---|---|---|
| Jenna Ghattaora | 11 | Nottingham | Top 6 |
| Lottie Pottinger | 12 | Cheshire | Top 6 |
| Macy Braithwaite | 12 | Coventry | Top 6 |
| Maisie | 12 | Swindom | Eliminated |
| Rachel | 12 | Solihull | Eliminated |

Top 6 semifinalsAirdate: 23 November 2016FinalsAirdate: 24–25 November 2016
| Baker | Age | Hometown | Result |
|---|---|---|---|
| Nikki Lilly | 12 | London | Won |
| Macy Braithwaite | 12 | Coventry | Runner-up |
| Tyrese | 11 | London | Runner-up |
| Jenna Ghattaora | 11 | Nottingham | Eliminated |
| Lottie Pottinger | 12 | Cheshire | Eliminated |
| Francesca | 11 | Middlesex | Withdrew (Note: Francesca fell ill before the semifinal and could not continue competing further.) |

== Series 5 (2019) ==
The fifth series began on 4 November 2019 on Channel 4. Harry Hill presented the series which was judged by Prue Leith and Liam Charles.

Heat one
| Baker | Age | Hometown | Star Baker (leg) | Position |
|---|---|---|---|---|
| Aleena | 15 | Manchester | 2 (3rd & 4th) | Top 10 |
| Amal | 13 | Essex | 0 | Top 10 |
| Maddie | 11 | London | 0 | Top 10 |
| Tilly | 10 | Bath | 1 (5th) | Top 10 |
| Vaughan | 13 | Hartlepool | 0 | Top 10 |
| Bakr | 15 | Derby | 1 (2nd) | Eliminated 4th |
| Zoë | 10 | Nottingham (originally from Texas, USA) | 0 | Eliminated 3rd |
| Zak | 13 | Hertfordshire | 0 | Eliminated 2nd |
| George | 11 | Devonshire | 0 | Eliminated 1st |
| Oliver | 10 | Northampton | 1 (1st) | Eliminated 1st |

Heat two
| Baker | Age | Hometown | Star Baker (leg) | Position |
|---|---|---|---|---|
| Eliza | 14 | North Yorkshire | 4 (1st, 2nd, 3rd & 5th) | Top 10 |
| Fin Woodward | 13 | Manchester | 1 (4th) | Top 10 |
| Kian | 13 | Hull | 0 | Top 10 |
| Tom O | 15 | Gloucestershire | 0 | Top 10 |
| Tom W | 13 | Falmouth | 0 | Top 10 |
| Karina | 13 | West Yorkshire | 0 | Eliminated 4th |
| Lorien | 9 | London | 0 | Eliminated 3rd |
| Jaya | 10 | Solihull | 0 | Eliminated 2nd |
| Dru | 15 | London | 0 | Eliminated 1st |
| Sam | 9 | Berkshire | 0 | Eliminated 1st |

Top 10 Finals
| Baker | Age | Hometown | Star Baker (leg) | Star Baker (total) | Finish |
|---|---|---|---|---|---|
| Fin Woodward | 13 | Manchester | 0 | 1 | Won |
| Aleena | 15 | Manchester | 1 (4th) | 3 | Runner-up |
| Amal | 13 | Essex | 2 (1st & 2nd) | 2 | Runner-up |
| Eliza | 14 | North Yorkshire | 1 (3rd) | 5 | Runner-up |
| Tom W | 13 | Falmouth | 0 | 0 | 5th |
| Vaughan | 13 | Hartlepool | 0 | 0 | 5th |
| Kian | 13 | Hull | 0 | 0 | 7th |
| Tom O | 15 | Gloucestershire | 0 | 0 | 7th |
| Maddie | 11 | London | 0 | 0 | 9th |
| Tilly | 10 | Bath | 0 | 1 | 10th |

Viewership ratings for series five (2019)
| Episode No. | Airdate | Viewers (millions) | Channel Weekly Ranking |
|---|---|---|---|
| 1 | 4 November 2019 | 1.86 | 7 |
| 2 | 5 November 2019 | 1.58 | 9 |
| 3 | 6 November 2019 | 1.39 | 14 |
| 4 | 7 November 2019 | —N/a | Outside Top 15 |
| 5 | 8 November 2019 | —N/a | Outside Top 15 |
| 6 | 11 November 2019 | —N/a | Outside Top 15 |
| 7 | 12 November 2019 | 1.47 | 15 |
| 8 | 13 November 2019 | 1.49 | 13 |
| 9 | 14 November 2019 | —N/a | Outside Top 15 |
| 10 | 15 November 2019 | 1.60 | 9 |
| 11 | 18 November 2019 | 1.46 | 11 |
| 12 | 19 November 2019 | 1.58 | 5 |
| 13 | 20 November 2019 | 1.46 | 10 |
| 14 | 21 November 2019 | 1.54 | 8 |
| 15 | 22 November 2019 | 1.66 | 4 |

== Series 6 (2021) ==
The sixth series of Junior Bake Off began on 11 January 2021 on Channel 4 with Ravneet Gill replacing Prue Leith.

Heat one
| Baker | Age | Hometown | Star Baker (leg) | Position |
|---|---|---|---|---|
| Cece | 13 | Kent | 0 | Top 8 |
| Fern | 10 | Merseyside | 1 (4th) | Top 8 |
| Reece Suwali | 14 | Leicestershire | 2 (1st & 5th) | Top 8 |
| Robbie | 15 | Bristol | 1 (2nd) | Top 8 |
| Erin | 13 | Worcestershire | 1 (3rd) | Eliminated 4th |
| Sophia | 10 | Hertfordshire | 0 | Eliminated 3rd |
| Fyn | 10 | Hampshire | 0 | Eliminated 2nd |
| Charlie | 10 | Worcestershire | 0 | Eliminated 1st |

Heat two
| Baker | Age | Hometown | Star Baker (leg) | Position |
|---|---|---|---|---|
| Maddi | 14 | Gateshead | 1 (4th) | Top 8 |
| Naima | 9/10 | South London | 0 | Top 8 |
| Safiyyah | 14 | Reading | 2 (2nd & 5th) | Top 8 |
| Zack Cohen | 13 | Leeds | 2 (1st & 3rd) | Top 8 |
| Henry | 11 | Hertfordshire | 0 | Eliminated 4th |
| Will | 12 | West Yorkshire | 0 | Eliminated 3rd |
| Toby | 13 | Cambridge | 0 | Eliminated 2nd |
| Sicily | 10 | Devon | 0 | Eliminated 1st |

Top 8 Finals
| Baker | Age | Hometown | Star Baker (leg) | Star Baker (total) | Finish |
|---|---|---|---|---|---|
| Reece Suwali | 14 | Leicestershire | 2 (1st & 2nd) | 4 | Won |
| Cece | 13 | Kent | 0 | 0 | Runner-up |
| Naima | 9-10 | South London | 1 (4th) | 1 | Runner-up |
| Robbie | 15 | Bristol | 1 (3rd) | 2 | Runner-up |
| Safiyyah | 14 | Reading | 0 | 2 | 5th |
| Fern | 10 | Merseyside | 0 | 1 | 6th |
| Zack Cohen | 13 | Leeds | 0 | 2 | 7th |
| Maddi | 14 | Gateshead | 0 | 1 | 8th |

Viewership ratings for series six (2021)
| Episode No. | Airdate | Viewers (millions) | Channel Weekly Ranking |
|---|---|---|---|
| 1 | 11 January 2021 | 1.70 | 11 |
| 2 | 12 January 2021 | 1.59 | 13 |
| 3 | 13 January 2021 | 1.66 | 12 |
| 4 | 14 January 2021 | 1.42 | 15 |
| 5 | 15 January 2021 | —N/a | Outside Top 15 |
| 6 | 18 January 2021 | —N/a | Outside Top 15 |
| 7 | 19 January 2021 | 1.64 | 14 |
| 8 | 20 January 2021 | 1.90 | 10 |
| 9 | 21 January 2021 | 1.63 | 15 |
| 10 | 22 January 2021 | 1.72 | 11 |
| 11 | 25 January 2021 | 1.60 | 13 |
| 12 | 26 January 2021 | 1.53 | 15 |
| 13 | 27 January 2021 | —N/a | Outside Top 15 |
| 14 | 28 January 2021 | 1.65 | 11 |
| 15 | 29 January 2021 | 1.84 | 9 |

== Series 7 (2022) ==
The seventh series originally aired on 10–28 January 2022 on Channel 4, with 16 contestants competing to be crowned the winner of the seventh series. Comedian Harry Hill and bakers Liam Charles and Ravneet Gill returned as host and judges respectively. From episodes 1–3, Paul Hollywood stood in for Charles. The bakers were divided into two groups of 8, with four eliminated from each group over five days of competition. The remaining four bakers from each group were combined in the week-long finals, culminating in a "super-difficult showdown" episode that determined the winner. Kezia won the 2022 series.

Heat one
| Baker | Age | Hometown | Star Baker (leg) | Position |
|---|---|---|---|---|
| Kezia | 13 | London | 2 (3rd & 5th) | Top 8 |
| Lola | 9 | Lancashire | 1 (4th) | Top 8 |
| Macy | 10 | Liverpool | 0 | Top 8 |
| Quique | 9 | Devon (originally from Madrid, Spain) | 1 (2nd) | Top 8 |
| Eliza Cottrell | 10 | Hertfordshire | 0 | Eliminated 4th |
| Mia WL | 11 | London | 0 | Eliminated 3rd |
| Will | 11 | Hertfordshire | 0 | Eliminated 2nd |
| Joey | 11 | Manchester | 1 (1st) | Eliminated 1st |

Heat two
| Baker | Age | Hometown | Star Baker (leg) | Position |
|---|---|---|---|---|
| Aisya | 12 | Manchester | 1 (4th) | Top 8 |
| Fraser | 15 | York | 3 (2nd, 3rd & 5th) | Top 8 |
| Gabriel | 10 | Cornwall | 0 | Top 8 |
| Salma | 13 | Manchester | 1 (1st) | Top 8 |
| Tomos | 11 | Cardiff | 0 | Eliminated 4th |
| Mia C | 15 | Newcastle | 0 | Eliminated 3rd |
| D'vonte | 11 | Nottinghamshire | 0 | Eliminated 2nd |
| Olivia | 9 | Nottingham | 0 | Eliminated 1st |

Top 8 Finals
| Baker | Age | Hometown | Star Baker (leg) | Star Baker (total) | Finish |
|---|---|---|---|---|---|
| Kezia | 13 | London | 1 (2nd) | 3 | Won |
| Aisya | 12 | Manchester | 1 (4th) | 2 | Runner-up |
| Lola | 9 | Lancashire | 1 (1st) | 2 | Runner-up |
| Fraser | 15 | York | 1 (3rd) | 4 | Runner-up |
| Quique | 9 | Devon (originally from Madrid, Spain) | 0 | 1 | 5th |
| Macy | 10 | Liverpool | 0 | 0 | 6th |
| Salma | 13 | Manchester | 0 | 1 | 7th |
| Gabriel | 10 | Cornwall | 0 | 0 | 8th |

Viewership ratings for series seven (2022)
| Episode No. | Airdate | Viewers (millions) | Channel Weekly Ranking |
|---|---|---|---|
| 1 | 10 January 2022 | 1.34 | 10 |
| 2 | 11 January 2022 | 1.32 | 11 |
| 3 | 12 January 2022 | —N/a | Outside Top 15 |
| 4 | 13 January 2022 | —N/a | Outside Top 15 |
| 5 | 14 January 2022 | —N/a | Outside Top 15 |
| 6 | 17 January 2022 | —N/a | Outside Top 15 |
| 7 | 18 January 2022 | 1.19 | 13 |
| 8 | 19 January 2022 | —N/a | Outside Top 15 |
| 9 | 20 January 2022 | —N/a | Outside Top 15 |
| 10 | 21 January 2022 | 1.17 | 15 |
| 11 | 24 January 2022 | —N/a | Outside Top 15 |
| 12 | 25 January 2022 | 1.23 | 13 |
| 13 | 26 January 2022 | 1.22 | 14 |
| 14 | 27 January 2022 | —N/a | Outside Top 15 |
| 15 | 28 January 2022 | 1.24 | 12 |

== Series 8 (2023) ==
The eighth series of Junior Bake Off began airing on 16 January 2023 on Channel 4. For the fourth series in a row, Harry Hill presented the series, which was judged by Ravneet Gill and Liam Charles. Amelia won the competition and Thomas, Mya and Annabel B were runners up.

Heat one
| Baker | Age | Hometown | Star Baker (leg) | Position |
|---|---|---|---|---|
| Sofia | 10 | Lancashire | 2 (1st & 5th) | Top 8 |
| Imogen | 9 | Bath | 1 (2nd) | Top 8 |
| Dolly | 10 | Cheshire | 0 | Top 8 |
| Annabel A | 11 | Antrim | 1 (4th) | Top 8 |
| Oliver | 11 | Yorkshire | 1 (1st) | Eliminated 4th |
| Charlie | 9 | Sussex | 0 | Eliminated 3rd |
| Ezekiel | 12 | Leeds | 0 | Eliminated 2nd |
| Alfie | 9 | Sussex | 0 | Eliminated 1st |

Heat two
| Baker | Age | Hometown | Star Baker (leg) | Position |
|---|---|---|---|---|
| Amelia | 12 | Staffordshire | 2 (2nd & 5th) | Top 8 |
| Thomas | 12 | London | 1 (1st) | Top 8 |
| Mya | 10 | London | 0 | Top 8 |
| Annabel B | 9 | Essex | 2 (3rd & 4th) | Top 8 |
| Harrison | 10 | West Midlands | 0 | Eliminated 4th |
| Poppy | 11 | Tyne and Wear | 0 | Eliminated 3rd |
| Tristan | 10 | Essex | 0 | Eliminated 2nd |
| Jamie | 10 | Warwickshire | 0 | Eliminated 1st |

Top 8 Finals
| Baker | Age | Hometown | Star Baker (leg) | Star Baker (total) | Finish |
|---|---|---|---|---|---|
| Amelia | 12 | Staffordshire | 1 (3rd) | 3 | Won |
| Annabel B | 9 | Essex | 0 | 2 | Runner-up |
| Mya | 10 | London | 1 (4th) | 1 | Runner-up |
| Thomas | 12 | London | 2 (1st & 2nd) | 3 | Runner-up |
| Sofia | 10 | Lancashire | 0 | 2 | 5th |
| Imogen | 9 | Bath | 0 | 1 | 6th |
| Dolly | 10 | Cheshire | 0 | 0 | 7th |
| Annabel A | 11 | Antrim | 0 | 1 | 8th |

== Series 9 (2024) ==
The ninth series of Junior Bake Off began airing on 2 January 2024 on Channel 4. For the fifth series in a row, Harry Hill presented the series, which was judged by Ravneet Gill and Liam Charles. Tilly won the competition and Max, Annabelle and Ilham were runners up.

Heat one
| Baker | Age | Hometown | Star Baker (leg) | Position |
|---|---|---|---|---|
| Grace | 12 | Somerset | 2 (3rd & 4th) | Top 8 |
| Rudy | 10 | Birmingham | 2 (2nd & 5th) | Top 8 |
| Charlie | 10 | Swansea | 0 | Top 8 |
| Esme | 9 | Essex | 0 | Top 8 |
| Ethan | 11 | Bath (originally from Trinidad and Tobago) | 0 | Eliminated 4th |
| Elsie | 9 | London | 0 | Eliminated 3rd |
| Layla | 11 | Leeds | 0 | Eliminated 2nd |
| Issac | 11 | Yorkshire | 1 (1st) | Eliminated 1st |

Heat two
| Baker | Age | Hometown | Star Baker (leg) | Position |
|---|---|---|---|---|
| Tilly | 12 | Oxfordshire | 1 (4th) | Top 8 |
| Annabelle | 12 | Manchester | 2 (2nd & 5th) | Top 8 |
| Max | 12 | Surrey | 2 (1st & 3rd) | Top 8 |
| Ilham | 10 | London | 0 | Top 8 |
| Harry | 12 | West Midlands | 0 | Eliminated 4th |
| Santica | 11 | Belfast | 0 | Eliminated 3rd |
| Leo | 11 | Isle of Wight | 0 | Eliminated 2nd |
| Calvin | 9 | Yorkshire | 0 | Eliminated 1st |

Top 8 Finals
| Baker | Age | Hometown | Star Baker (leg) | Star Baker (total) | Finish |
|---|---|---|---|---|---|
| Tilly | 12 | Oxfordshire | 1 (3rd) | 2 | Won |
| Annabelle | 12 | Manchester | 1 (2nd) | 3 | Runner-up |
| Max | 12 | Surrey | 0 | 2 | Runner-up |
| Ilham | 10 | London | 2 (1st & 4th) | 2 | Runner-up |
| Grace | 12 | Somerset | 0 | 2 | 5th |
| Rudy | 10 | Birmingham | 0 | 2 | 6th |
| Charlie | 11 | Swansea | 0 | 0 | 7th |
| Esme | 9 | Essex | 0 | 0 | 8th |

== Series 10 (2025) ==
The tenth series of Junior Bake Off began airing on 6 January 2025 and ended on 24 January 2025 on Channel 4. For the sixth series in a row, Harry Hill presented the series, with returning judges Ravneet Gill and Liam Charles. Austin won the competition and Lola, Ronnie and Deji were runners up.

Heat one
| Baker | Age | Hometown | Star Baker (leg) | Position |
|---|---|---|---|---|
| Deji | 12 | Berkshire (originally from Nigeria) | 3 (1st, 2nd & 5th) | Top 8 |
| Lola | 10 | Leicestershire | 1 (3rd) | Top 8 |
| Ronnie | 10 | South Yorkshire | 1 (4th) | Top 8 |
| Austin Edwards | 10 | Berkshire | 0 | Top 8 |
| Francesca | 11 | Belfast | 0 | Eliminated 4th |
| Farah | 11 | Northamptonshire | 0 | Eliminated 3rd |
| Rose | 11 | Buckinghamshire | 0 | Eliminated 2nd |
| Enzo | 9 | Somerset | 0 | Eliminated 1st |

Heat two
| Baker | Age | Hometown | Star Baker (leg) | Position |
|---|---|---|---|---|
| Bela | 11 | Cheshire | 1 (3rd) | Top 8 |
| Jay | 12 | Worcestershire | 1 (4th) | Top 8 |
| Kingston | 11 | Cambridgeshire | 2 (2nd & 5th) | Top 8 |
| Lana Devine | 10 | Tyne and Wear | 0 | Top 8 |
| Joey | 10 | Norfolk | 0 | Eliminated 4th |
| Aasiyah | 11 | London | 0 | Eliminated 3rd |
| Ben | 9 | London | 1 (1st) | Eliminated 2nd |
| Jessie | 12 | London | 0 | Eliminated 1st |

Top 8 Finals
| Baker | Age | Hometown | Star Baker (leg) | Star Baker (total) | Finish |
|---|---|---|---|---|---|
| Austin Edwards | 10 | Berkshire | 1 (2nd) | 1 | Won |
| Ronnie | 10 | South Yorkshire | 1 (4th) | 2 | Runner-up |
| Deji | 12 | Berkshire (originally from Nigeria) | 0 | 3 | Runner-up |
| Lola | 10 | Leicestershire | 1 (1st) | 2 | Runner-up |
| Lana Devine | 10 | Tyne and Wear | 1 (3rd) | 1 | 5th |
| Kingston | 11 | Cambridgeshire | 0 | 2 | 6th |
| Jay | 12 | Worcestershire | 0 | 1 | 7th |
| Bela | 11 | Cheshire | 0 | 1 | 8th |

== Series 11 (2026) ==
The eleventh series of Junior Bake Off began airing on 5 January 2026 on Channel 4. For the seventh series in a row, Harry Hill presented the series, with returning judges Ravneet Gill and Liam Charles.

Heat one
| Baker | Age | Hometown | Star Baker (leg) | Position |
|---|---|---|---|---|
| Aiyla L | 14 | West Yorkshire | 2 (1st & 5th) | Top 8 |
| Kitto | 13 | Dorset | 1 (2nd) | Top 8 |
| Miko | 14 | Surrey | 2 (3rd & 4th) | Top 8 |
| Myla | 11 | Derbyshire | 0 | Top 8 |
| Cole | 13 | Derbyshire | 0 | Eliminated 4th |
| Zakariya | 11 | West Yorkshire | 0 | Eliminated 3rd |
| Niamh | 11 | Tyne & Wear | 0 | Eliminated 2nd |
| Elroy | 12 | Surrey | 0 | Eliminated 1st |

Heat two
| Baker | Age | Hometown | Star Baker (leg) | Position |
|---|---|---|---|---|
| Aiyla F | 11 | West Yorkshire | 1 (4th) | Top 8 |
| Humphrey | 14 | Derbyshire | 0 | Top 8 |
| Penelope | 9 | Hertfordshire | 1 (5th) | Top 8 |
| Umayr | 13 | London | 1 (3rd) | Top 8 |
| Ethan | 10 | East Yorkshire | 0 | Eliminated 4th |
| Lyla | 12 | Northern Ireland | 1 (2nd) | Eliminated 3rd |
| Khadeejah | 15 | London | 0 | Eliminated 2nd |
| Harvey | 13 | Cornwall | 1 (1st) | Eliminated 1st |

Top 8 Finals
| Baker | Age | Hometown | Star Baker (leg) | Star Baker (total) | Finish |
|---|---|---|---|---|---|
| Aiyla L | 14 | West Yorkshire | 2 (2nd & 3rd) | 4 | Won |
| Kitto | 13 | Dorset | 0 | 1 | Runner-up |
| Miko | 14 | Surrey | 1 (1st) | 3 | Runner-up |
| Umayr | 13 | London | 1 (4th) | 2 | Runner-up |
| Aiyla F | 11 | West Yorkshire | 0 | 1 | 5th |
| Humphrey | 14 | Derbyshire | 0 | 0 | 6th |
| Penelope | 9 | Hertfordshire | 0 | 1 | 7th |
| Myla | 11 | Derbyshire | 0 | 0 | 8th |

== International versions ==
The Brazilian version of Junior Bake Off - Junior Bake Off Brasil aired for three seasons until 2020 on SBT.
