= Misérable cake =

Traditional Belgian almond sponge cake

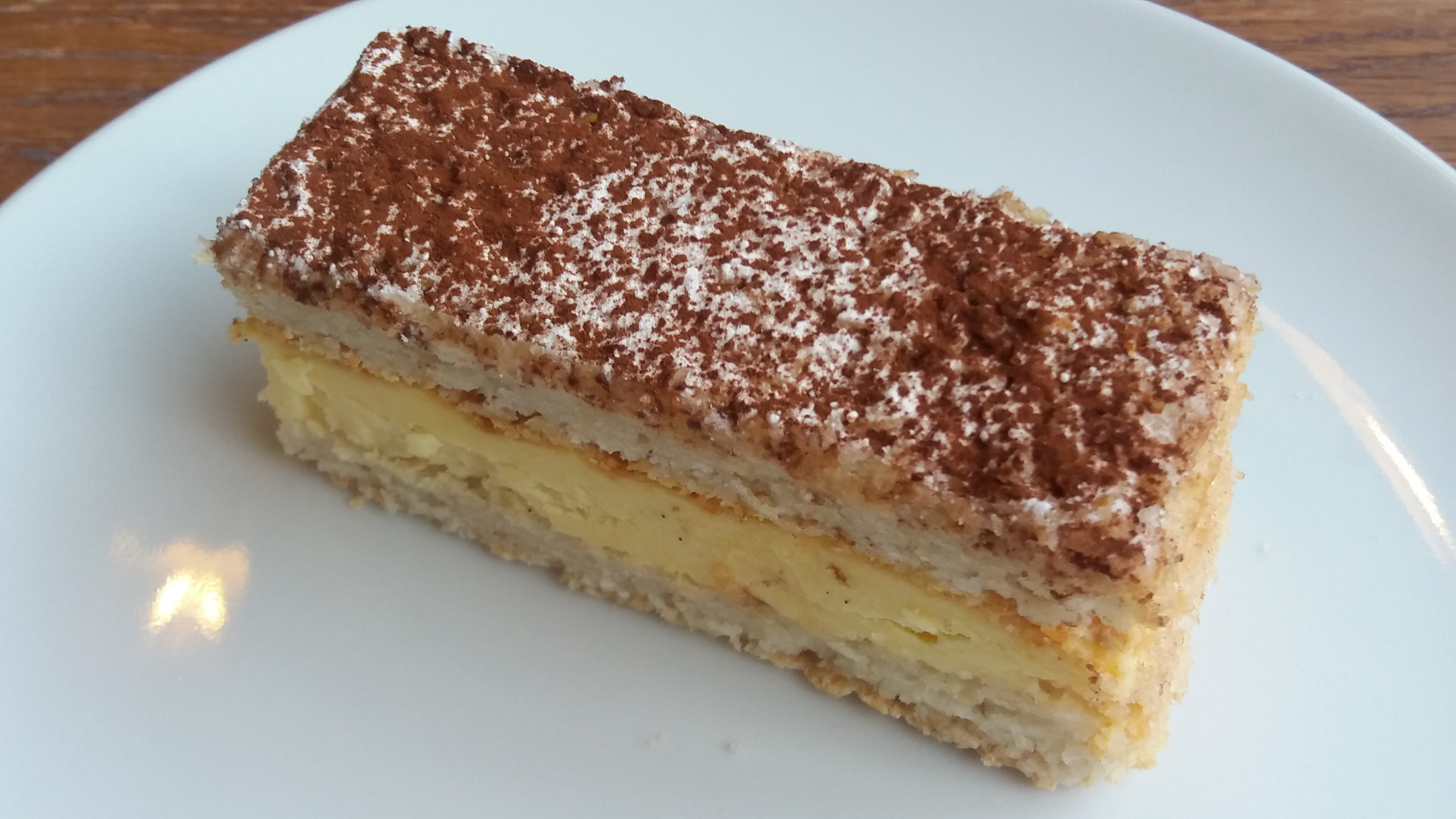
Misérable cake

A misérable cake is a type of almond sponge cake that is a traditional Belgian recipe. The cake is filled with pudding made by whisking hot sugar syrup into an egg yolk foam, known as a pâte à bombe. The cake base is made from almonds, known as a biscuit joconde.

== See also ==
- List of cakes
- Foam cake
