= Liam Charles =

British baker (born 1997)

- Born: 28 August 1997 (age 29); Hackney, London, England
- Occupation: Baker
- Years active: 2017–present
- Known for: The Great British Bake Off, Junior Bake Off, Bake Off: The Professionals

Liam Charles (born 28 August 1997) is a British baker, television presenter and contestant from Series 8 of The Great British Bake Off. He is currently a presenter on Bake Off: The Professionals and a judge on Junior Bake Off.

== Education ==
Charles was a student at Stoke Newington School and later attended Goldsmiths University in London, where he studied Drama and Theatre Arts.

== Career ==
=== Television work ===
Charles first came to public attention as a contestant in The Great British Bake Off in 2017, being knocked out in the 8th week. He came fifth in the competition.

In 2018, he was chosen to co-present Bake Off: The Professionals with comedian Tom Allen. In November 2018, he also presented the baking programme Liam Bakes on Channel 4. In November 2019 Charles and Prue Leith were the new judges for Junior Bake Off after a two-year absence. Harry Hill was the presenter.

In October 2022, Liam appeared in the second UK series of The Masked Dancer. He was revealed to be the character "Candlestick" in the sixth episode.

=== Writing ===
He has written two cookbooks, Cheeky Treats: 70 Brilliant Bakes and Cakes, which was released on 12 July 2018, and Second Helpings released 19 September 2019. He also writes a column on baking for The Guardian.

== Platinum Pudding Competition ==
In January 2022, it was announced that Charles would serve as a judge for The Platinum Pudding Competition, a nationwide baking competition, with the support of Buckingham Palace, Fortnum & Mason, and The Big Jubilee Lunch. Its purpose was to discover a new pudding recipe dedicated to Queen Elizabeth II as part of the official Platinum Jubilee celebrations in 2022, commemorating the 70th anniversary of Queen Elizabeth II's accession to the throne on 6 February 1952.

== Filmography ==
Year	Title	Role	Notes
2017	The Great British Bake Off	Contestant	9 episodes
2018–present	Bake Off: The Professionals	Presenter	4 series
2018	Liam Bakes	Baker	6 episodes
2019–present	Junior Bake Off	Judge	102 episodes
2019	8 out of 10 Cats	Panelist	Episode 6
2022	The Masked Dancer	Himself/Candlestick	Season 2 contestant
2024	The Tiny Chef Show	Himself	Episode: "Bee's Knees Tea"
