= Labyrinth of Jareth Masquerade Ball =

Annual costume event in California, US

- Logo/poster for the 17th Ball, 2014
- Status: Active
- Genre: Masquerade Ball
- Frequency: Annually
- Venue: Millennium Biltmore Hotel (currently)
- Location: Los Angeles
- Country: United States
- Years active: 29
- Founded: 1997
- Founder: Shawn Strider
- Attendance: 5,500
- Organiser: Shawn Strider; Sypher Arts Studio
- Website: https://labyrinthmasquerade.com/

The Labyrinth of Jareth Masquerade Ball, shortened to LOJ or simply known as the Labyrinth Masquerade Ball, is an annual masquerade ball and cosplay event in Los Angeles, California. The ball was first held in 1997.

== Event ==
Attendees wear elaborate costumes in the fantasy couture style, including a mask for most participants. Some attendees have worn mechanical wings. Faerie and goblin costumes typically predominate, although participants also dress in styles such as steampunk, Venetian and Gothic.

The name of the ball is a reference to the 1986 fantasy film Labyrinth, specifically the scene in which the protagonist, Sarah Williams, finds herself in a masquerade ball. The other ballgoers in the scene wear strange and grotesque, but also elaborate and formal costumes and masks. The event's title namechecks Labyrinth's main antagonist, Jareth, the Goblin King.

TravelPulse, a publication of TravAlianceMedia, characterized the ball in 2015 as one of five "must-see" masquerade balls around the world, along with the Carnival of Venice, the Surva International Festival of Masquerade in Pernik, Bulgaria, the Fancy Dress Festival of Ghana, and the Grand Masked Ball of Kamel Ouali held in France.

== History ==
The ball was founded in 1997 by Shawn Strider and was chiefly inspired by the masquerade scene in Labyrinth as well as the Venetian tradition of masquerade balls. Strider created the event as he wished to experience a masquerade in the style of 1980s fantasy films, namely Labyrinth, The Dark Crystal and Legend.

The first Labyrinth of Jareth Masquerade Ball was held in San Diego for an expected 50 people, with about 150 actual attendees. Although originally intended as a singular event, the success of the first ball, which attracted guests from New York and Chicago, led to successive balls, becoming an annual tradition. After being held in various U.S. cities including New Orleans, Santa Monica and Hollywood, the ball eventually moved permanently to Los Angeles and expanded into a two-day event. 2014's event was the last to be held at Park Plaza Hotel, Los Angeles, and since 2015 the ball has been held at its current venue, the Millennium Biltmore Hotel. As of 2017, the ball's attendance number is 5,500.

In its first five years, the theme of the ball generally revolved around Labyrinth, imitating the ballroom of the masquerade scene as well as the film's story. In 2003 Brian Froud, the conceptual designer of Labyrinth and The Dark Crystal, took interest in the event and suggested Strider use his writing ideas to expand on the story and its universe, offering his knowledge of ancient faerie lore and Arthurian legend. Subsequently, the ball expanded beyond the universe of Labyrinth to create new characters and situations, while developing its own mythology around the film's original story. Strider told NerdAlert in 2017, "We sort of created legends of things that have happened [in the story] and things that are going forward. In our mythology, there have always been goblins within the Labyrinth, and there's a legend of maybe a faerie prince or a goblin prince that left [the Labyrinth] at some point due to a broken heart, muttering something about some girl named Sarah".

Since 2003, the ball has developed a linear storyline which is built upon each year, with the story written by Strider and presented by Sypher Arts Studio, a team of sculptors, puppeteers, costumers, choreographers, performers and make-up artists. The narrative is performed at the ball across five stages, complete with elaborate sets and fantasy effects. Although a new story arc is introduced each year, the basis of the story revolves around the Court of Sypher, which has established itself inside the Labyrinth, a place where the flow of time no longer works properly. According to Strider, attendees are encouraged to "create their own characters and their own mythologies" to add to the "court of strange mythological creatures and characters".

Beyond the principal inspirations of Labyrinth and Venetian masquerades, further influences of the ball have included Celtic faerie and goblin folklore and Norse mythology, along with fantasy literature such as A Midsummer Night's Dream and The Lord of the Rings.

Due to the COVID-19 pandemic, the 23rd ball was deferred from 2020 to 2021.
