= My Kitchen Rules UK series 3 =

My Kitchen Rules UK
- Series 3
- No. of episodes: 40

Release
- Original network: Channel 4
- Original release: 25 September – 17 November 2017

Series chronology
- ← Previous; Series 2 Next → Canceled

The third season of the British competitive cooking competition show, My Kitchen Rules, with Irish competitors was derived from the Australian-show of the same name My Kitchen Rules. It premiered on 25 September 2017. Scottish team Clare & Neil won the season.

== Format changes ==
- Judges - This season had two new regular judges, Glynn Purnell, a Michelin-starred chef and food writer Rachel Allen. Elimination Cook-Offs had guest judges.

== Competition details ==
=== Instant Restaurants ===
During the Instant Restaurant rounds, each team hosts a three-course dinner for judges and fellow teams. They are scored and ranked among their group and judges, with the lowest scoring team being eliminated.

==== Round 1 ====
- Episodes 1 to 5
- Airdate – 25 to 29 September
- Description – The first of the instant restaurant groups are introduced into the competition in Round 1, in north England. The teams had five for pre-preparation until guests arrived, 30 further minutes to serve the starter, on hour for mains and 30 minutes for dessert. The lowest scoring team at the end of this round is eliminated.

Instant Restaurant Summary
Group 1
Team and Episode Details		Guest Scores					Glynn's Scores			Rachel's Scores			Total (out of 100)	Rank	Result
Team and Episode Details		S&F	T&G	Y&N	B&G	C&S	Starter	Main	Dessert	Starter	Main	Dessert	Total (out of 100)	Rank	Result
	Shabana & Farzana	—	6	6	7	6	5	7	6	5	8	6	62	=3rd	
Ep 1	25 September	Spice Street													
Dishes	Starter	Spicy Fish Tacos with Lime & Mango Salad*													
Dishes	Main	Chicken & Lamb Shawarma with Avocado & Pomegranate Salad, Vegetable Fried Rice & Garlic Chilli Noodles*													
Dishes	Dessert	Chocolate & Raspberry Gateau Tower													
	Tosin & Genevieve	4	—	6	8	6	8	6	5	9	6	5	63	2nd	Through to next round
Ep 2	26 September	The African Buka													Through to next round
Dishes	Starter	Dodo (Friend Plaintain) and Prawns with Homemade Chilli Sauce													Through to next round
Dishes	Main	Beef Suya with Jollof Rice $ Efo Riro (Spinach Sauce)													Through to next round
Dishes	Dessert	Pineapple & Hibiscus Cake with Pineapple Coulis and Cream Cheese Mousse													Through to next round
	Yee Kwan & Natalie	6	7	—	8	8	7	8	8	8	8	8	76	1st	Through to next round
Ep 3	27 September	Buddha's Bowl													Through to next round
Dishes	Starter	Pan-Fried Spiced Beef & Chive Dumplings with Chilli Vinergar													Through to next round
Dishes	Main	Monkfish King Prawn Laksa with Yellow Egg Noodles & Spring Onion Flatbread*													Through to next round
Dishes	Dessert	Yuzu Tart with Blueberry Coulis													Through to next round
	Bill & Graham	5	5	7	—	5	6	7	6	6	9	6	62	=3rd	Through to next round
Ep 4	28 September	Lancashire Lounge													Through to next round
Dishes	Starter	Salmon Goujons with Lime Mayonnaise Dip*													Through to next round
Dishes	Main	Lamb's Liver with Bacon, Wilted Greens, Cream Potatoes and Onion Gravy*													Through to next round
Dishes	Dessert	Summer Fruit Tartlet in Jelly with Chantilly Cream													Through to next round
	Claire & Sarah	3	4	6	4	—	4	4	4	5	4	5	43	5th	Eliminated
Ep 5	6 October	Outside Influence													Eliminated
Dishes	Starter	Duck Egg Quinoa Salad with Fresh Dill and Cucumber Pickle													Eliminated
Dishes	Main	Hake Fish Fingers with Sweet Potato Rosti Pea Purée with Tomato Ketchup, Tartare Sauce, Chimichurri													Eliminated
Dishes	Dessert	Rhubarb and Strawberry Crumble; Lime & Coconut Syllabub													Eliminated

==== Round 2 ====
- Episodes 6 to 10
- Airdate – 2 to 6 October
- Description – The second of the instant restaurant groups are introduced into the competition in Round 2, in south England. The teams had five for pre-preparation until guests arrived, 30 further minutes to serve the starter, on hour for mains and 30 minutes for dessert. The lowest scoring team at the end of this round is eliminated.

Instant Restaurant Summary
Group 2
Team and Episode Details		Guest Scores					Glynn's Scores			Rachel's Scores			Total (out of 100)	Rank	Result
Team and Episode Details		N&J	L&H	J&W	S&N	L&I	Starter	Main	Dessert	Starter	Main	Dessert	Total (out of 100)	Rank	Result
	Nathalie & Jade	—	5	6	6	6	7	3	3	8	4	5	53	5th	Eliminated
Ep 6	2 October	Crystal Cove													Eliminated
Dishes	Starter	Spicy Smoked Fish Bouillabaisse with Guyanese Bread Bakes & Cod Fishcakes*													Eliminated
Dishes	Main	Berbice Spice Beef Curry with Aromatic Rice, Potato Puri & Crispy Fried Plantain*													Eliminated
Dishes	Dessert	Caramelised Mango Tart with Chantilly Cream & Captain's "To Die For" Chcolate Sauce*													Eliminated
	Liz & Helen	4	—	8	8	8	7	8	6	8	8	7	72	1st	Through to next round
Ep 7	3 October	The Captain's Table													Through to next round
Dishes	Starter	Crab Tart with Samphire, Peas and Lemon Dressing													Through to next round
Dishes	Main	Captain's Seafood Feast with Homemade French Bread, Seaweed Butter*													Through to next round
Dishes	Dessert	Hot Lemon Souffles with Lemon Curd Ice Cream in a Brandy Snap Basket and Caramelised Lemon													Through to next round
	Jenni & Will	5	6	—	7	7	5	6	8	6	7	8	65	2nd	Through to next round
Ep 8	4 October	The Hungry Badger													Through to next round
Dishes	Starter	Potted Brixham Crab with Pomegranate & Rocket Salad and Vanilla & Lime Dressing													Through to next round
Dishes	Main	Roast Chicken Breakfast with Celeriac Mash, Roast Parsnips, Toasted Pine Nuts & Spinach and Somerset Cider Sauce*													Through to next round
Dishes	Dessert	Crème Brûlée with Rhubard Purée and Clotted Cream & Ginger Shortbread													Through to next round
	Sam & Neil	4	6	6	—	7	8	6	5	9	7	6	64	3rd	Through to next round
Ep 9	5 October	Repast													Through to next round
Dishes	Starter	Mackerel with Verde Sawse Cheat's Bread (Medieval)													Through to next round
Dishes	Main	Mutton with Caper Sauce, Sippets, Lightly Spiced Parsnips & Carrots (Tudor)*													Through to next round
Dishes	Dessert	Tafferty Tart with Earl Grey Ice Cream (Jacobean)*													Through to next round
	Luthfer & Inayat	4	6	7	7	—	7	7	4	8	7	6	63	4th	Through to next round
Ep 10	6 October	Exclusive Eats													Through to next round
Dishes	Starter	Prawn Lemongrass Skewers with Lollipop Chicken, Spicy Salsa*													Through to next round
Dishes	Main	Masala Tamarind Lamb & Lobster with Spiced Parsnip Purée, Falvoured Butters, Purple Broccoli													Through to next round
Dishes	Dessert	Lemon & Kaffir Lime Leaf Posset with Pistachio Shards, Pistachio Creme, Pistachio Creme													Through to next round

==== Round 3 ====
- Episodes 11 to 15
- Airdate – 9 to 13 October
- Description – The third of the instant restaurant groups are introduced into the competition in Round 3, in Scotland. The teams had five for pre-preparation until guests arrived, 30 further minutes to serve the starter, on hour for mains and 30 minutes for dessert. The lowest scoring team at the end of this round is eliminated.

Instant Restaurant Summary
Group 3
Team and Episode Details		Guest Scores					Glynn's Scores			Rachel's Scores			Total (out of 100)	Rank	Result
Team and Episode Details		A&J	J&P	D&G	A&R	C&N	Starter	Main	Dessert	Starter	Main	Dessert	Total (out of 100)	Rank	Result
	Angela & James	—	8	7	8	9	7	8	6	8	7	6	74	2nd	Through to next round
Ep 11	9 October	Thai Aye													Through to next round
Dishes	Starter	Langoustine Summer Rolls with Creamy Peanut & Garlic Soy Dipping Sauces*													Through to next round
Dishes	Main	Duck Red Curry with Seasonal Vegetables & Jasmine Rice													Through to next round
Dishes	Dessert	Haggis Chocolate Fondant with Mango Sorber													Through to next round
	Jack & Phil	6	—	6	7	7	7	6	5	8	7	5	64	5th	Eliminated
Ep 12	10 October	The Gallery													Eliminated
Dishes	Starter	Scotch Egg with Rocket & Chervil Salad and Apply Relish													Eliminated
Dishes	Main	Whole Seabass with Dauphinoise Potatoes and Roasted Vegetables*													Eliminated
Dishes	Dessert	Cranachan with Chocolate Dipped Strawberries													Eliminated
	Deborah & Geoff	7	7	—	8	9	9	4	7	8	4	8	71	3rd	Through to next round
Ep 13	11 October	The Dough Book													Through to next round
Dishes	Starter	Arbroath Smokies with Sourdough Rye Chilli Jam*													Through to next round
Dishes	Main	Spiced Pork Fillet with Mustard & Lemon Sauce, Home Fried, Cauliflower, Carrots													Through to next round
Dishes	Dessert	Sourdough Pancakes with Macerated Berries, Maple Mascarpone Cream													Through to next round
	Annette & Rebecca	7	8	6	—	7	6	7	5	7	7	6	66	4th	Through to next round
Ep 14	12 October	Galloway Kitchen													Through to next round
Dishes	Starter	Mini Scottish Breakfast with Haggis, Poached Egg, Homemade Tattie Scones, Tomatoes													Through to next round
Dishes	Main	Slow-Cooked Lamb with Puy Lentils, Potato Stacks													Through to next round
Dishes	Dessert	Banana Brownie with Banana Ice Cream													Through to next round
	Clare & Niall	8	9	8	9	—	10	7	8	10	7	8	84	1st	Through to next round
Ep 15	13 October	The Misty Isle													Through to next round
Dishes	Starter	Crab & Whisky Bisque with Homemade Croutons, Seared Scallops													Through to next round
Dishes	Main	Roe Deer with Mushroom and Asparagus Risotto*													Through to next round
Dishes	Dessert	Lavender & Skye Honey Terrine with Raspberry Coulis and Crumble													Through to next round

==== Round 4 ====
- Episodes 16 to 20
- Airdate – 16 to 20 October
- Description – The fourth of the instant restaurant groups are introduced into the competition in Round 3, in Midland and Wales. The teams had five for pre-preparation until guests arrived, 30 further minutes to serve the starter, on hour for mains and 30 minutes for dessert. The lowest scoring team at the end of this round is eliminated.

Instant Restaurant Summary
Group 3
Team and Episode Details		Guest Scores					Glynn's Scores			Rachel's Scores			Total (out of 100)	Rank	Result
Team and Episode Details		S&R	C&D	R&S	L&E	J&A	Starter	Main	Dessert	Starter	Main	Dessert	Total (out of 100)	Rank	Result
	Sian & Rob	—	7	7	6	7	7	4	8	7	5	8	66	3rd	Through to next round
Ep 16	16 October	The Cwtch (The Catch)													Through to next round
Dishes	Starter	Burry Inlet Cockle & Bacon Chowder with Homemade Welsh Cob													Through to next round
Dishes	Main	Roast Leg of Lamb with Crispy Lamb Breast, Root Vegetable Mash, Red Wine Gravy													Through to next round
Dishes	Dessert	Vanilla Panna Cotta with Mango Sorber													Through to next round
	Celia & Dave	6	—	6	7	6	5	8	6	6	8	7	65	4th	Through to next round
Ep 17	17 October	Ceecee's Kitchen													Through to next round
Dishes	Starter	Tropical Cod Two Ways with Fried Dumpling													Through to next round
Dishes	Main	Classic Nigerian Stew with Seafood & Okra, Yam, Sweet Potato, Spiced Meat Skewer*													Through to next round
Dishes	Dessert	Equatorial Fruits with Mango Ice Cream, Ginger & Honey Biscuit*													Through to next round
	Ray & Simon	8	6	—	8	8	7	9	6	7	9	7	75	1st	Through to next round
Ep 18	18 October	The Brewer's Arms													Through to next round
Dishes	Starter	Penclawdd Cockle & Laverbread Gratin*													Through to next round
Dishes	Main	Steak & Grey Trees Stout Pie with Perl Las Topping, Triple Cooked Chips, Sautéed Leeks & Gravy*													Through to next round
Dishes	Dessert	Imperial Stout, Coffee & Chocolate Mousse with Hop-Infused Bread													Through to next round
	Lucy & Emily	4	3	7	—	6	7	4	5	8	4	5	53	5th	Eliminated
Ep 19	19 October	The Global Gourmet													Eliminated
Dishes	Starter	East African Inspired Quail Scotch Eggs with South African Blatjang													Eliminated
Dishes	Main	Mexican Inspired Fish and Chips with Sweet Potato and Tequila Mayonnaise*													Eliminated
Dishes	Dessert	Brazilian Style Trifle with Chocolate, Strawberries and Truffles													Eliminated
	Jacqueline & Andrew	9	4	8	9	—	8	6	7	8	6	8	73	2nd	Through to next round
Ep 20	20 October	Evolution													Through to next round
Dishes	Starter	Shropshire Blue Cheese & Vegetable Tart with Waldorf Salad													Through to next round
Dishes	Main	Rack of Shropshire Lamb, Pancetta Rosti, Carrots a L'Orange with Port and Redcurrant Sauce*													Through to next round
Dishes	Dessert	Raspberry Nougat Parfait with Fresh Berries, Berry Coulis and Lange de Chat Biscuit													Through to next round

==== Round 5 ====
- Episodes 21 to 25
- Airdate – 23 to 27 October
- Description – Each team was mentored by a celebrity chef. They had 30 minutes of planning time and two hours to prepare the meal. They were scored by the judges and the teams in the round. The eight lowest scored teams in the next three rounds were eliminated.

===== Team 1 =====
- Description – Round 1 winners Yee Kwan & Natalie were challenged by Pierre Koffmann to cook a dish with a surprise ingredient of rabbit.

Instant Restaurant Summary
Group 1 - Team 1
Team and Episode Details		Guest Scores					Glynn's Scores		Rachel's Scores		Pierre's Scores		Total (out of 100)	Rank	Result
Team and Episode Details		Y&N	A&J	S&N	R&S	G&D	Main	Dessert	Main	Dessert	Main	Dessert	Total (out of 100)	Rank	Result
	Yee Kwan & Natalie	—	8	8	9	7	9	9	9	8	9	9	85	1st	Through to next round
Ep 21	23 October														Through to next round
Dishes	Main	Braised Rabbit in Cider with Pomme Purée and Baby Carrots*													Through to next round
Dishes	Dessert	Asian Pear & Plum Crumble with Ginger Ice-Cream													Through to next round

===== Team 2 =====
- Description – Round 3 runner-up Angela & James were challenged by Ken Hom to cook a dish with a surprise ingredient of whole salmon.

Instant Restaurant Summary
Group 1 - Team 2
Team and Episode Details		Guest Scores					Glynn's Scores		Rachel's Scores		Ken's Scores		Total (out of 100)	Rank	Result
Team and Episode Details		Y&N	A&J	S&N	R&S	G&D	Main	Dessert	Main	Dessert	Main	Dessert	Total (out of 100)	Rank	Result
	Angela & James	5	—	6	7	6	8	5	9	6	9	7	68	3rd	Eliminated
Ep 22	24 October														Eliminated
Dishes	Main	Salmon Bun Cha*													Eliminated
Dishes	Dessert	Orange Tart with Vietnamese Egg Coffee													Eliminated

===== Team 3 =====
- Description – Round 2 third placed Sam & Neil were challenged by Antonio Carluccio to cook a dish with a surprise ingredient of courgettes, courgette flowers and aubergine.

Instant Restaurant Summary
Group 1 - Team 3
Team and Episode Details		Guest Scores					Glynn's Scores		Rachel's Scores		Antonio's Scores		Total (out of 100)	Rank	Result
Team and Episode Details		Y&N	A&J	S&N	R&S	G&D	Main	Dessert	Main	Dessert	Main	Dessert	Total (out of 100)	Rank	Result
	Sam & Neil	7	5	—	8	6	8	6	8	7	8	8	71	2nd	Through to next round
Ep 23	25 October														Through to next round
Dishes	Main	Melanzane Parmigiana with Fiori di Zucchini Ripieni*													Through to next round
Dishes	Dessert	Amalfi Lemon Tart with Strawberry and Basil Sorbet													Through to next round

===== Team 4 =====
- Description – Round 4 winners Ray & Simon were challenged by Stephen Terry to cook a dish with a surprise ingredient of saddle of Welsh lamb.

Instant Restaurant Summary
Group 1 - Team 4
Team and Episode Details		Guest Scores					Glynn's Scores		Rachel's Scores		Stephen's Scores		Total (out of 100)	Rank	Result
Team and Episode Details		Y&N	A&J	S&N	R&S	G&D	Main	Dessert	Main	Dessert	Main	Dessert	Total (out of 100)	Rank	Result
	Ray & Simon	5	4	5	—	5	8	4	8	4	8	7	58	5th	Eliminated
Ep 24	26 October														Eliminated
Dishes	Main	Moroccan Lamb with Spiced Potatoes & Roast Vegetbles*													Eliminated
Dishes	Dessert	Honey & Lemon Cheesecake with Strawberry Coulis													Eliminated

===== Team 5 =====
- Description – Round 3 third placed Geoff & Debra were challenged by Rachel Khoo to cook a dish with a surprise ingredient of beetroot.

Instant Restaurant Summary
Group 1 - Team 5
Team and Episode Details		Guest Scores					Glynn's Scores		Rachel A's Scores		Rachel K's Scores		Total (out of 100)	Rank	Result
Team and Episode Details		Y&N	A&J	S&N	R&S	G&D	Main	Dessert	Main	Dessert	Main	Dessert	Total (out of 100)	Rank	Result
	Deborah & Geoff	5	5	5	7	—	7	7	8	6	8	7	65	4th	Eliminated
Ep 25	27 October														Eliminated
Dishes	Main	Tricolor Beetroot Salad with Soused Mackerel*													Eliminated
Dishes	Dessert	Struffoli & Ice Cream with Candied Beetroot													Eliminated

==== Round 6 ====
- Episodes 26 to 30
- Airdate – 30 October to 3 November
- Description – Each team was mentored by a celebrity chef. They had 30 minutes of planning time and two hours to prepare the meal. They were scored by the judges and the teams in the round. The eight lowest scored teams in the next three rounds were eliminated.

===== Team 1 =====
- Description – Round 2 winners Liz & Helen were challenged by Claude Bosi to cook a dish with a surprise ingredient of squab.

Instant Restaurant Summary
Group 1 - Team 1
Team and Episode Details		Guest Scores					Glynn's Scores		Rachel's Scores		Claude's Scores		Total (out of 100)	Rank	Result
Team and Episode Details		L&H	J&W	T&G	A&R	J&A	Main	Dessert	Main	Dessert	Main	Dessert	Total (out of 100)	Rank	Result
	Liz & Helen	—	8	7	8	7	9	7	9	7	9	8	79	4th	Eliminated
Ep 26	30 October														Eliminated
Dishes	Main	Squad Pigeon & Jerusalem Artichoke Purée with Dressed Green Beans*													Eliminated
Dishes	Dessert	Salted Chocolate Tart with Vanilla Ice-Cream & Raspberries*													Eliminated

===== Team 2 =====
- Description – Round 2 runners-up Jenni & Will were challenged by Paul Ainsworth to cook a dish with a surprise ingredient of bone-in rib of beef.

Instant Restaurant Summary
Group 1 - Team 2
Team and Episode Details		Guest Scores					Glynn's Scores		Rachel's Scores		Paul's Scores		Total (out of 100)	Rank	Result
Team and Episode Details		L&H	J&W	T&G	A&R	J&A	Main	Dessert	Main	Dessert	Main	Dessert	Total (out of 100)	Rank	Result
	Jenni & Will	8	—	8	8	8	9	6	9	6	9	7	78	5th	Eliminated
Ep 27	31 October														Eliminated
Dishes	Main	Rib Eye of Beef with Potato Dauphinoise, Bordelaise Sauce, Roast Tomato, Courgette Salad*													Eliminated
Dishes	Dessert	Eton Mess with Basil Macaron*													Eliminated

===== Team 3 =====
- Description – Round 1 runners-up Tosin & Geneviève were challenged by Allegra McEvedy to cook a dish with a surprise ingredient of live crabs.

Instant Restaurant Summary
Group 1 - Team 3
Team and Episode Details		Guest Scores					Glynn's Scores		Rachel's Scores		Allegra's Scores		Total (out of 100)	Rank	Result
Team and Episode Details		L&H	J&W	T&G	A&R	J&A	Main	Dessert	Main	Dessert	Main	Dessert	Total (out of 100)	Rank	Result
	Tosin & Geneviève	7	6	—	8	8	9	7	9	8	9	9	80	=2nd	Through to next round
Ep 28	1 November														Through to next round
Dishes	Main	Fragrant Thai Crab Curry with Shredded Salad and Sambal													Through to next round
Dishes	Dessert	African Mango & Passion Fruit Cheesecake with Mango Sorbet													Through to next round

===== Team 4 =====
- Description – Round 3 fourth-placed Annette & Rebecca were challenged by Gizzi Erskine to cook a dish with a surprise ingredient of prawns (carabineros and tiger prawns).

Instant Restaurant Summary
Group 1 - Team 4
Team and Episode Details		Guest Scores					Glynn's Scores		Rachel's Scores		Gizzi's Scores		Total (out of 100)	Rank	Result
Team and Episode Details		L&H	J&W	T&G	A&R	J&A	Main	Dessert	Main	Dessert	Main	Dessert	Total (out of 100)	Rank	Result
	Annette & Rebecca	7	9	8	—	8	9	10	9	9	9	10	88	1st	Through to next round
Ep 29	2 November														Through to next round
Dishes	Main	Paella*													Through to next round
Dishes	Dessert	Lemon Polenta Cake with Lemon Cream Raspberries													Through to next round

===== Team 5 =====
- Description – Round 4 second-placed Jacqueline & Andrew were challenged by Daniel Clifford to cook a dish with a surprise ingredient of chicken legs.

Instant Restaurant Summary
Group 1 - Team 5
Team and Episode Details		Guest Scores					Glynn's Scores		Rachel's Scores		Daniel's Scores		Total (out of 100)	Rank	Result
Team and Episode Details		L&H	J&W	T&G	A&R	J&A	Main	Dessert	Main	Dessert	Main	Dessert	Total (out of 100)	Rank	Result
	Jacqueline & Andrew	6	7	8	8	—	9	8	9	8	9	8	80	=2nd	Through to next round
Ep 30	3 November														Through to next round
Dishes	Main	Ballotine of Chicken with New Potatoes, Peas & Broad Beans*													Through to next round
Dishes	Dessert	Strawberry & Basil Tart													Through to next round

==== Round 7 ====
- Episodes 31 to 35
- Airdate 6–10 November
- Description – Each team was mentored by a celebrity chef. They had 30 minutes of planning time and two hours to prepare the meal. They were scored by the judges and the teams in the round. The eight lowest scored teams in the next three rounds were eliminated.

===== Team 1 =====
- Description – Round 4 third-placed Sian & Rob were challenged by Francesco Mazzei to cook a dish with a surprise ingredient of N'Duja.

Instant Restaurant Summary
Group 1 - Team 1
Team and Episode Details		Guest Scores					Glynn's Scores		Rachel's Scores		Francesco's Scores		Total (out of 100)	Rank	Result
Team and Episode Details		S&R	B&G	C&D	L&I	C&N	Main	Dessert	Main	Dessert	Main	Dessert	Total (out of 100)	Rank	Result
	Sian & Rob	—	7	5	7	7	9	8	9	8	9	8	77	1st	Through to next round
Ep 31	6 November														Through to next round
Dishes	Main	Nduja Crusted Scallops with Soft Polenta and Aubergine Dressing*													Through to next round
Dishes	Dessert	Zabaglione Tiramisu with Biscotti and Homemade Limoncello													Through to next round

===== Team 2 =====
- Description – Round 1 [equal] third-placed Bill & Graham were challenged by Nigel Haworth to cook a dish with a surprise ingredient of cauliflower.

Instant Restaurant Summary
Group 1 - Team 2
Team and Episode Details		Guest Scores					Glynn's Scores		Rachel's Scores		Nigel's Scores		Total (out of 100)	Rank	Result
Team and Episode Details		S&R	B&G	C&D	L&I	C&N	Main	Dessert	Main	Dessert	Main	Dessert	Total (out of 100)	Rank	Result
	Bill & Graham	6	—	5	7	8	7	8	8	9	8	9	75		Through to next round
Ep 32	7 November														Through to next round
Dishes	Main	New Season's Cauliflower with Bulgur Wheat, Smoked Haddock & Morecambe Bay Shrimps*													Through to next round
Dishes	Dessert	Roast Peach with Raspberries and Vanilla Ice Cream													Through to next round

===== Team 3 =====
- Description – Round 4 fourth-placed Celia & Dave were challenged by Theo Randall to cook a dish with a surprise ingredient of beans.

Instant Restaurant Summary
Group 1 - Team 3
Team and Episode Details		Guest Scores					Glynn's Scores		Rachel's Scores		Theo's Scores		Total (out of 100)	Rank	Result
Team and Episode Details		S&R	B&G	C&D	L&I	C&N	Main	Dessert	Main	Dessert	Main	Dessert	Total (out of 100)	Rank	Result
	Celia & Dave	5	5	—	5	6	7	6	7	7	7	7	62	4th	Eliminated
Ep 33	8 November														Eliminated
Dishes	Main	Borlotti Bean Stew Red Mullet with Bulgur Wheat, Smoked Haddock & Morecambe Bay Shrimps*													Eliminated
Dishes	Dessert	Amalfi Lemon Ice Cream with Strawberries													Eliminated

===== Team 4 =====
- Description – Round 2 fourth-placed Luthfur & Inaya were challenged by Nisha Katona to cook a dish with a surprise ingredient of guinea fowl.

Instant Restaurant Summary
Group 1 - Team 4
Team and Episode Details		Guest Scores					Glynn's Scores		Rachel's Scores		Nisha's Scores		Total (out of 100)	Rank	Result
Team and Episode Details		S&R	B&G	C&D	L&I	C&N	Main	Dessert	Main	Dessert	Main	Dessert	Total (out of 100)	Rank	Result
	Luthfur & Inayat	6	6	2	—	7	8	4	8	5	7	5	58	5th	Eliminated
Ep 34	9 November														Eliminated
Dishes	Main	North and South Guineafowl with Stuffed Fried Bhindi, Tarka Dhal, Roti*													Eliminated
Dishes	Dessert	Sticky Rice Pudding with Rhubarb and Date Compote*													Eliminated

===== Team 5 =====
- Description – Round 3 winners Clare & Niall were challenged by Nathan Outlaw to cook a dish with a surprise ingredient of mackerel.

Instant Restaurant Summary
Group 1 - Team 5
Team and Episode Details		Guest Scores					Glynn's Scores		Rachel's Scores		Nathan's Scores		Total (out of 100)	Rank	Result
Team and Episode Details		S&R	B&G	C&D	L&I	C&N	Main	Dessert	Main	Dessert	Main	Dessert	Total (out of 100)	Rank	Result
	Clare & Niall	7	7	2	7	—	8	8	7	8	9	9	72	3rd	Through to next round
Ep 35	10 November														Through to next round
Dishes	Main	Smocked Mackerel with Fennel & Apply Salad*													Through to next round
Dishes	Dessert	Chcocolate & Basil Fondant with Gooseberry Ice Cream													Through to next round

==== Round 8 ====
- Episodes 36
- Airdate 13 November
- Description – The remaining eight teams had to cook 50 savory and 50 desserts for fans of Harry Potter on the 20th anniversary of Harry Potter and the Philosopher's Stone. The fans and the judges will choose their favorites who would go straight to the final, while the two least favorite, as determined by the judged, would be eliminated. They had 2 hours to prepare, 30 minutes to serve the savory dish, 15 minutes to get the sweet dish ready and 30 minutes to serve the sweet dish.

Round 8
Harry Potter Challenge
Team	Dishes		Result
Tosin & Genevieve	Savory	North African Chicken with Smoky Ratatouille	Through to quarter-finals
Tosin & Genevieve	Sweet	Grilled Pineapple with Rum Syrup Crème Fraiche	Through to quarter-finals
Jacqueline & Andrew	Savory	Shakshuka with Black Olive, Harcha Flatbread	Eliminated
Jacqueline & Andrew	Sweet	Chocolate Orange with Clotted Cream	Eliminated
Sian & Rob	Savory	Lamb Kofta with Tabbouleh, Beetroot Hummus, Mint Dressing and Flatbread	People's Choice; Through to semi-finals
Sian & Rob	Sweet	Mahalabia with Poached Pears and Middle Eastern Welsh Cakes	People's Choice; Through to semi-finals
Clare & Neil	Savory	Pan Seared Rump with Asian Infused Salad & Crispy Thai Noodles	Judge's Choice; Through to semi-finals
Clare & Neil	Sweet	Rhubarb Fool with Rosewater & Elderflower Jelly	Judge's Choice; Through to semi-finals
Annette & Rebecca	Savory	Monkfish Kebabs with Chickpea Salad and Flatbread	Through to quarter-finals
Annette & Rebecca	Sweet	Poached Fruit with Cherry Brandy and Caramel Sauce	Through to quarter-finals
Sam & Neil	Savory	Apician Prawns with Chickpea Salad and Flatbread	Through to quarter-finals
Sam & Neil	Sweet	Griddled Apricots with Cumin Syrup & Honeyed Yoghurt	Through to quarter-finals
Yee Kwan & Natalie	Savory	Spicy Korean Lamb with Cantonese Noodles	Through to quarter-finals
Yee Kwan & Natalie	Sweet	Mango & Pomelo Sago	Through to quarter-finals
Bill & Graham	Savory	Nutty Banana Split	Eliminated
Bill & Graham	Sweet		Eliminated

==== Quarter final ====
- Episodes 37
- Airdate 14 November
- Description – The remaining four teams battled it out for the remaining two spots into the semi-finals. The teams had to cook vegetarian main dishes. Thomasina Miers was the guest judge. They had 90 minutes to cook their dish.

Kitchen HQ Quarter-final summary
Team	Main dish	Scores			Overall score (out of 30)	Result
Team	Main dish	Glynn's Scores	Rachel's Scores	Thomasina's Scores	Overall score (out of 30)	Result
Tosin & Genevieve	Akara with Chakalaka, Bean Purée and Roast Potatoes					Through to semi-finals
Sam & Neil	Barage Raviolo with Fennel Fritters, Courgette, Agrodolce, and Cucumber & Butter Sauce					Through to semi-finals

Kitchen HQ Quarter-final summary
Team	Main dish	Scores			Overall score (out of 30)	Result
Team	Main dish	Glynn's Scores	Rachel's Scores	Thomasina's Scores	Overall score (out of 30)	Result
Annette & Rebecca	Aubergine Parmigiana with Tagliatelle and Pesto					Eliminated
Yee Kwan & Natalie	Braised Chinese Mushrooms & Dried Bean Curd with Sugar Snap Peas, Lotus Crisps & Jasmine Rice					Eliminated

==== Semi final 1 ====
- Episodes 38
- Airdate 15 November
- Description – Of the remaining four teams battled it out for the final two spots into the finals. Sam & Neil and Tosin & Genevieve were in the first semi-final. The teams had to cook an indian meal with guest judge Tony Singh. They had 90 minutes to prepare their starter, 60 minutes to cook their main dish and 45 minutes for the dessert.

Kitchen HQ Quarter-final summary
Team	Main dish	Scores			Overall score (out of 30)	Result
Team	Main dish	Glynn's Scores	Rachel's Scores	Tony Singh's Scores	Overall score (out of 30)	Result
Tosin & Genevieve	Goan Fish Croquettes with Raita & Tomato Chutney; Chicken Chettinad with Lemon Rice; Carrot Halwa with Vanilla & Orange Chantilly Cream					Eliminated
Sam & Neil	Ding Dong Lamb with Yoghurt Mousse, Cucumber & Mint Granita and Mint Chutney; Chicken Quorema, Bhoonee Kitcheree, Kuttah Carree and Palak Roti; Carrot Pudding with Caramel Sauce and Buttermilk Ice Cream					Through to Grand Final

==== Semi final 2 ====
- Episodes 39
- Airdate 16 November
- Description – Of the remaining four teams battled it out for the final two spots into the finals. Sam & Neil and Tosin & Genevieve were in the first semi-final. The teams had to cook an indian meal with guest judge Vivek Singh. They had 90 minutes to prepare their starter, minutes to cook their main dish and minutes for the dessert.

Kitchen HQ Quarter-final summary
Team	Main dish	Scores			Overall score (out of 30)	Result
Team	Main dish	Glynn's Scores	Rachel's Scores	Vivek Singh's Scores	Overall score (out of 30)	Result
Clare & Neil	Curried Crab Puris with Cumin Yoghurt and Spiced Plus Chutney; Tandoori Quail with Paneer & Pea Curry and Cauliflower Rice; Gajar Halwa with Brandy Snap and Orange Rind Mascarpone					Through to Grand Final
Sian & Rob	Spiced Prawns and Calamari with Coriander Aioli; Spiced Loin of Lamb with Bombay Potatoes, Pea & Mint Puree, Dahl and Chapati; Cardamom Cake and Orange Syrup with Mango & Passion Fruit Sorbet, sessame Brittle and Vanilla Lassi					Eliminated

==== Grand final ====
- Episodes 40
- Airdate 17 November
- Description – The finalists, Sam & Neil and Clare & Neil faced off in the Grand Final. The teams had to cook french cuisine with guest judge Jay Rayner. They had two hours to prepare their starter, 60 minutes to cook their main dish and 45 minutes for the dessert.

Kitchen HQ Quarter-final summary
Team	Main dish	Scores			Overall score (out of 30)	Result
Team	Main dish	Glynn's Scores	Rachel's Scores	Jay's Scores	Overall score (out of 30)	Result
Sam & Neil	Velouté à la Dieppoise; Noisette D'Agneau Paloise with Pommes Fondantes and Petit Pois Bonne Femme; Omelette Norvégienne					Eliminated
Clare & Neil	Venison Tartare with Horseradish Crème Fraîche and Homemade Toast; Fillet of Hake with Crab Mash and Parsley Cream; Bramble Brulée with Sorrel & Mine Sorbet and Lemon Shortbread					Winners

== Notes ==
* Teams were late to present the dish.
