= My Kitchen Rules UK series 2 =

My Kitchen Rules UK
- Series 2
- No. of episodes: 30

Release
- Original network: Channel 4
- Original release: 3 October – 16 November 2016

Series chronology
- ← Previous; Series 1 Next → Series 3 (2017)

The second season of the British competitive cooking competition show, My Kitchen Rules was derived from the Australian-show of the same name My Kitchen Rules. It premiered on 3 October 2016. Ami & Nicola of Scotland won the tournament.

== Format changes ==
- Judges - This season had two new regular judges, a Michelin-starred chef Michael Caines and food critic and writer Prue Leith. Elimination Cook-Offs had guest judges.
- Rules - This season, the rules changed slightly.
  - Instant Restaurant Round - The format included a time limit and a one point deductions for going the allotted time. The teams had: seven hours (preparation (with the exception of pre-preparation resulting in a deduction of an hour)), 45 minutes (starter), one hour (mains), 45 minutes (dessert)

== Teams ==
Region	Members	Relationship	Status
Glasgow, Scotland	Ami & Nicola	Glasgow Gals	Champions
Edinburgh, Scotland	Hugh & Ste	The Geeks	Eliminated (Round 1)
Edinburgh, Scotland	Rebecca & Nansai	Housemates	Eliminated (Round 5)
Edinburgh, Scotland	Paula & David	Hearty Hebrideans	Eliminated (Instant Restaurants)
Wakefield, Yorkshire	Simon & Linda	Mam 'n' Son	Eliminated (Semi Finals)
North Allerton, Yorkshire	Angela & Rob	Hunter Gatherers	Eliminated (Instant Restaurants)
Huddersfield	Razan & Reda	Syrian Siblings	Eliminated (Round 7)
Harrogate, North Yorkshire	Anna & Faye	Healthy Mummies	Eliminated (Round 7)
Lasham, Hampshire	Catherine & Debbie	Ladies of the Village	Eliminated (Runner-up)
Bournemouth	Sarah & Ramjan	Bollywood Spice	Eliminated (Instant Restaurants)
Plymouth	Ben & Dan	Barbecue Buddies	Eliminated (Round 5)
Somerset	Beverley & Sarah	Country Couple	Eliminated (Round 3)
Cambrian, Newport, Wales	Laura & Louis	Foodie Fiancés	Eliminated (Semi Finals)
Birmingham	Thuy & Thu	Inseparable Sisters	Eliminated (Instant Restaurants)
Chesterfield, Derbyshire	Raechel & Andy	Medical Mates	Eliminated (Round 6)
Nottingham	Karen & Alex	Nottingham Newlyweds	Eliminated (Round 4)

== Elimination history ==
Teams' Competition Progress
Round:		Instant Restaurants	Round 5	Round 6	Round 7	Semi Final	Finale
Round:		1-4	5	6	7	8	9
Teams:		Progress					
Glasgow, Scotland	Ami & Nicola	4th (60)	Safe	Safe	Safe	Through to Grand Final	Champions
Lasham	Catherine & Debbie	1st (77)	Immune	Safe	Safe	Through to Grand Final	Runners-up
Wakefield	Simon & Linda	2nd (61)	Safe	Safe	Safe	Eliminated (52)	—N/a
Huddersfield	Razan & Reda	3rd (60)	Safe	Safe	Eliminated (19)	—N/a	—N/a
Chesterfield	Raechel & Andy	2nd (71)	Safe	Eliminated (38)	—N/a	—N/a	—N/a
Cambrian, Wales	Laura & Louis	2nd (62)	Safe	Safe	Safe	Eliminated (54)	—N/a
Harrogate	Anna & Faye	1st (63)	Safe	Safe	Eliminated (17)	—N/a	—N/a
Plymouth	Ben & Dan	3rd (48)	Safe	Eliminated (31)	—N/a	—N/a	—N/a
Edinburgh, Scotland	Rebecca & Nansai	3rd (54)	Eliminated (30)	—N/a	—N/a	—N/a	—N/a
Nottingham	Karen & Alex	Elimination Cook-Off (25)	—N/a	—N/a	—N/a	—N/a	—N/a
Birmingham	Thuy & Thu	4th (58)	—N/a	—N/a	—N/a	—N/a	—N/a
Somerset	Beverley & Sarah	Elimination Cook-Off (30)	—N/a	—N/a	—N/a	—N/a	—N/a
Somerset	Angela & Rob	4th ((30)	—N/a	—N/a	—N/a	—N/a	—N/a
Bournemouth	Sarah & Ramjan	4th ((42)	—N/a	—N/a	—N/a	—N/a	—N/a
Edinburgh, Scotland	Hugh & Ste	Elimination Cook-Off (39)	—N/a	—N/a	—N/a	—N/a	—N/a
Edinburgh, Scotland	Paula & David	4th (49)	—N/a	—N/a	—N/a	—N/a	—N/a

== Competition details ==
=== Instant Restaurants ===
During the Instant Restaurant rounds, each team hosts a three-course dinner for judges and fellow teams. They are scored and ranked among their group and judges, with the lowest scoring team being eliminated.

==== Round 1 ====
- Episodes 1 to 4
- Airdate – 3 to 6 October
- Description – The first of the instant restaurant groups are introduced into the competition in Round 1, in Scotland. The lowest scoring team at the end of this round is eliminated.

Instant Restaurant Summary
Group 1
Team and Episode Details		Guest Scores				Michael's Scores			Prue's Scores			Total (out of 90)	Rank	Result
Team and Episode Details		A&N	H&S	R&N	P&D	Starter	Main	Dessert	Starter	Main	Dessert	Total (out of 90)	Rank	Result
	Ami & Nikola	—	7	7	6	6	7	6	6	5	5	55	2nd	Through to Elimination Cook-Off
Ep 1	3 October	Two Hungry Weegies												Through to Elimination Cook-Off
Dishes	Starter	Curried Langoustine Soup with Homemade Seeded Bread												Through to Elimination Cook-Off
Dishes	Main	Slow Roasted Pork Belly with Crispy Crackling Cider Gravy, Parmentier Potatoes and Purple Sprouting Broccoli												Through to Elimination Cook-Off
Dishes	Dessert	Millionaire Shortcake												Through to Elimination Cook-Off
	Hugh & Ste	5	—	5	5	5	6	4	5	7	8	50	3rd	Through to Elimination Cook-Off
Ep 2	4 October	The Time Machine												Through to Elimination Cook-Off
Dishes	Starter	Haggis Rissoles with Chicken Skin Crisps and Onion Chutney												Through to Elimination Cook-Off
Dishes	Main	Pheasant Breast on Cream Leeks with Crispy Pork and Rumbledthumps												Through to Elimination Cook-Off
Dishes	Dessert	Border Tart with Condensed Milk Ice Cream												Through to Elimination Cook-Off
	Rebecca & Nansai	7	8	—	8	6	7	7	7	6	8	64	1st	Safe
Ep 3	5 October	The Bonnie Tropicana												Safe
Dishes	Starter	Haggis Tropicana with Coconut Rice, Plantain and Mint Sauce												Safe
Dishes	Main	Ashanti Chicken with Jollof Rice and Spinach Sauce												Safe
Dishes	Dessert	Mango and Raspberry Cranachan with Puff Puffs and Sweet Pepper Dipping Sauce												Safe
	Paula & David	4	6	5	—	5	7	4	5	7	6	49	4th	Eliiminated
Ep 4	6 October	The Gaelic Coast												Eliiminated
Dishes	Starter	Pulled Herring with Dulse Bread, Homemade Butter and Hebridean Salts												Eliiminated
Dishes	Main	Slow Roasted Lamb with Buttery Polenta, Warm Carrot Salad and Kale Pesto												Eliiminated
Dishes	Dessert	Chocolate Teacake with Hebridean Sea Salt Caramel Sauce												Eliiminated

===== Elimination Cook-Off =====
- Episode 5
- Airdate – 7 October
- Description – Ami & Nikola and Hugh & Ste were set for an Elimination Cook-Off after their performance in the previous round. They had to use scallops as the hero of their dish in 45 minutes and were judged blind by Jimmy. For the next challenge, the teams had to cook their signature dish in 90 minutes.

Instant Restaurant Summary
Group 1
Team and Episode Details		Michael's Scores		Prue's Scores		Jimmy's Scores		Total (out of 60)	Result
		Scallop-based	Signature	Scallop-based	Signature	Scallop-based	Signature	Total (out of 60)	Result
Hugh & Ste		6	5	8	6	7	7	39	Eliminated
Dishes	Scallop-based	Scallops and Bacon with a Pickled Cucumber and Radish Salad							Eliminated
Dishes	Signature	Curried Lamb Chops with Spinach Pancakes, Brinjal Bhaji and Lemon Rice							Eliminated
Ami & Nikola		7	6	8	8	8	8	45	Through to next round
Dishes	Scallop-based	Oriental Scallop Broth							Through to next round
Dishes	Signature	Scottish Summer Lamb with Lamb Bonbons, Asparagus Spears and Broad Beans, Parmentier Potatoes and Lamb Jus							Through to next round

==== Round 2 ====
- Episodes 6 to 9
- Airdate – 10 to 13 October
- Description – The second of the instant restaurant groups were introduced into the competition in Round 2, in the north of England. The lowest scoring team at the end of this round is eliminated.

Instant Restaurant Summary
Group 1
Team and Episode Details		Guest Scores				Michael's Scores			Prue's Scores			Total (out of 90)	Rank	Result
Team and Episode Details		S&L	A&R	R&R	A&F	Starter	Main	Dessert	Starter	Main	Dessert	Total (out of 90)	Rank	Result
	Simon & Linda	—	7	7	7	6	6	7	7	7	7	61	2nd	Through to Elimination Cook-Off
Ep 6	10 October	Proper Yorkshire												Through to Elimination Cook-Off
Dishes	Starter	Yorkshire Tea Smoked Potted Trout with Traditional Yorkshire Oatcakes and Samphire												Through to Elimination Cook-Off
Dishes	Main	Fillet Steak and Beef Shin with Yorkshire Pudding, Horseradish Mash, Roasted Vegetables and Real Ale Reduction												Through to Elimination Cook-Off
Dishes	Dessert	Yorkshire Parkin and Forced Rhubarb Celebration with Proper Custard												Through to Elimination Cook-Off
	Angela & Rob	6	—	7	7	5	7	5	7	8	7	59	4th	Eliminated
Ep 7	11 October	Natural Bounty**												Eliminated
Dishes	Starter	Roe Deer Carpaccio with Panzanella Salad												Eliminated
Dishes	Main	Water Bathed Wood Pigeon with Crushed Peas and Ransom Pesto, Baby Turnips, Lentils and a Red Wine Jus												Eliminated
Dishes	Dessert	Local Honey Parfait with Olive Oil and Fresh Fruit												Eliminated
	Razan & Reda	7	7	—	7	6	5	7	8	6	7	60	3rd	Through to Elimination Cook-Off
Ep 8	12 October	Shahrazan - Arabian Night												Through to Elimination Cook-Off
Dishes	Starter	Portobello Mushroom Stuffed with Halloumi, Baba Ghanouj , Muhammara and Flat Breads												Through to Elimination Cook-Off
Dishes	Main	Kabab Karaz Smoked Lamb and Almond Meatballs with Sour Cherry Sauce, Burghul Wheat and Fattoush Salad												Through to Elimination Cook-Off
Dishes	Dessert	Katayef Asafiri Arabic Pancakes with Curd Cheese, Pistachios and Rosewater Syrup												Through to Elimination Cook-Off
	Anna & Faye	7	8	5	—	7	6	8	6	7	9	63	1st	Safe
Ep 9	13 October	Provincial Kitchen												Safe
Dishes	Starter	Local Goat's Cheese Garden Salad with Balsamic Reduction												Safe
Dishes	Main	Pan Fried Local Seabass with Crispy Kale, Tomato Caper and Olive Reduction and a Pea Puree and Thyme												Safe
Dishes	Dessert	Salted Caramel Chocolate Tart with Mango and Passionfruit Frozen Yoghurt												Safe

===== Elimination Cook-Off =====
- Episode 10
- Airdate – 14 October
- Description – Linda & Simon and Razan & Reda were set for an Elimination Cook-Off after their performance in the previous round. They had to use gooseberries as the hero of a savory starter dish in 45 minutes and were judged blind by Frances. For the next challenge, the teams had to cook their signature dish in 90 minutes and were again judged blind by Frances.

Instant Restaurant Summary
Group 1
Team and Episode Details		Michael's Scores		Prue's Scores		Frances's Scores		Total (out of 60)	Result
		Gooseberries-based	Signature	Gooseberries-based	Signature	Gooseberries-based	Signature	Total (out of 60)	Result
Linda & Simon		4	4	5	5	6	7	31	Through to next round
Dishes	Gooseberries-based	Gooseberry Asparagus and Yorkshire Cheese Mille Feuille with Heritage Tomato Salad							Through to next round
Dishes	Signature	Pan Fried Cod with Fried New Potatoes, Tomato Salsa, Pea Puree and G&T Scraps							Through to next round
Razan & Reda		6	5	4	4	6	5	30	Eliminated
Dishes	Gooseberries-based	Gooseberry Garlic Prawns with Gooseberry Couscous							Eliminated
Dishes	Signature	Makhloubeh Bzenjan with Rocket and Parmesan Salad							Eliminated

==== Round 3 ====
- Episodes 11 to 14
- Airdate – 18 to 21 October
- Description – The third of the instant restaurant groups were introduced into the competition in Round 3, in the south of England. The lowest scoring team at the end of this round is eliminated.

Instant Restaurant Summary
Group 1
Team and Episode Details		Guest Scores				Michael's Scores			Prue's Scores			Total (out of 90)	Rank	Result
Team and Episode Details		C&B	S&R	B&D	B&S	Starter	Main	Dessert	Starter	Main	Dessert	Total (out of 90)	Rank	Result
	Catherine & Debbie	—	5	7	5	6	7	8	7	7	7	59	1st	Safe
Ep 11	18 October	Persuasion												Safe
Dishes	Starter	Hampshire Watercress Soup with Poached Egg and Wild Garlic Oil												Safe
Dishes	Main	Fillet of Venison with Juniper and Redcurrant Sauce, Celeriac and Potato Gratin and Braised Red Cabbage and Tenderstems												Safe
Dishes	Dessert	Roasted Rhubarb with Potted Custard Ginger Crumble and Candied Orange												Safe
	Sarah & Ramjan	3	—	4	3	5	6	4	6	7	4	42	4th	Eliminated
Ep 12	19 October	Bollywood in Bournemouth												Eliminated
Dishes	Starter	Keema Capsicum with Mint Sauce and Homemade Garlic Naan Bread												Eliminated
Dishes	Main	Bhunna Spiced Poussin Stuffed with Quail Eggs with Jeera Butternut Crushed Squash, Saffron Pilau Rice and Poppadom												Eliminated
Dishes	Dessert	Cassava Cake with Strawberry Coulis and Cassava Crisp												Eliminated
	Ben & Dan	6	2	—	7	6	7	4	5	7	8	48	3rd	Through to Elimination Cook-Off
Ep 13	20 October	The Southern Smoke												Through to Elimination Cook-Off
Dishes	Starter	Smoked Eggs Twice: Scotch Egg and Devilled Egg with Grilled Asparagus on a Bed of Watercress South Carolina Sauce												Through to Elimination Cook-Off
Dishes	Main	Reverse Seared Tri-Tip Steak Finished Dirty with Hasselback Potatoes, Char Smoked Vegetables and Chimichurri*												Through to Elimination Cook-Off
Dishes	Dessert	Pineapple Upside Down Cake with Homemade Bourbon Vanilla Pod Ice Cream												Through to Elimination Cook-Off
	Beverley & Sarah	6	2	5	—	5	6	8	7	7	8	54	2nd	Through to Elimination Cook-Off
Ep 14	21 October	Provenance												Through to Elimination Cook-Off
Dishes	Starter	Nettle Soufflé with Caerphilly Cheese and Lamb's Lettuce												Through to Elimination Cook-Off
Dishes	Main	Berrow Lamb with Spelt Tabbouleh Spiced Slaw and Cauliflower												Through to Elimination Cook-Off
Dishes	Dessert	Steamed Seville Orange Pudding with Basil Ice Cream												Through to Elimination Cook-Off

===== Elimination Cook-Off =====
- Episode 15
- Airdate – 22 October
- Description – Ben & Dan and Beverley & Sarah were set for an Elimination Cook-Off after their performance in the previous round. They had to use Bath blue cheese as the hero of a starter dish in 45 minutes and were judged blind by Frances. For the next challenge, the teams had to cook their signature dish in 90 minutes.

Instant Restaurant Summary
Group 1
Team and Episode Details		Michael's Scores		Prue's Scores		Allegra's Scores		Total (out of 60)	Result
		Bath blue cheese-based	Signature	Bath blue cheese-based	Signature	Bath blue cheese-based	Signature	Total (out of 60)	Result
Ben & Dan		6	6	6	5	7	6	31	Through to next round
Dishes	Gooseberries-based	Bath Blue and Caramelised Onion Filo Tart with Pickled Beetroot and Radish Salad							Through to next round
Dishes	Signature	Lollipop Chicken with Pulled Chicken, Jalapeño Cornbread and Mango Chilli Salsa							Through to next round
Beverley & Sarah		4	3	3	6	7	7	30	Eliminated
Dishes	Gooseberries-based	Apple and Bath Blue Cheese Remoulade with Herb Beignet							Eliminated
Dishes	Signature	Roast Brill with English Marsh Samphire and Cockle Veloute							Eliminated

==== Round 4 ====
- Episodes 16 to 19
- Airdate – 24 to 27 October
- Description – The fourth of the instant restaurant groups were introduced into the competition in Round 4, in the Midland of England and Wales. The lowest scoring team at the end of this round is eliminated.

Instant Restaurant Summary
Group 1
Team and Episode Details		Guest Scores				Michael's Scores			Prue's Scores			Total (out of 90)	Rank	Result
Team and Episode Details		L&L	T&T	R&A	K&A	Starter	Main	Dessert	Starter	Main	Dessert	Total (out of 90)	Rank	Result
	Laura & Louis	—	6	7	6	7	6	8	6	7	9	62	2nd	Through to Elimination Cook-Off
Ep 16	24 October	Melin Dwr (Water Melt)												Through to Elimination Cook-Off
Dishes	Starter	Crab and Sewin*** Ravioli with Crab Bisque*												Through to Elimination Cook-Off
Dishes	Main	Welsh Rack of Lamb with Roasted Root Vegetables, Broad Beans, Mint Jelly and Lamb Reductions*												Through to Elimination Cook-Off
Dishes	Dessert	Poached Peaches with Mascarpone Ice Cream and Raspberry Welsh Cakes												Through to Elimination Cook-Off
	Thuy & Thu	5	—	7	6	8	5	6	7	8	6	58	4th	Eliminated
Ep 17	25 October	Spices of Asia												Eliminated
Dishes	Starter	Vietnamese Pho: Beef Noodle Soup												Eliminated
Dishes	Main	Spice Infused Duck Fillet with Orange Zest and Honey and Scented Trio of Rice												Eliminated
Dishes	Dessert	Exotic Fruits in Dragon Fruit Syrup with Caramelised Pineapple and Coconut and Lime Ice Cream*												Eliminated
	Raechel & Andy	7	6	—	7	6	7	7	7	8	9	64	1st	Safe
Ep 18	26 October	The Bees Knees												Safe
Dishes	Starter	Caramelised Scallops with Cauliflower Purée, Crisp Pancetta and Brown Butter Breadcrumbs												Safe
Dishes	Main	Filet Mignon with Oxtail in Red Wine, Fondant Potato and Asparagus												Safe
Dishes	Dessert	Bakewell Tart with Raspberry Compote and Custard												Safe
	Karen & Alex	6	6	6	—	6	6	8	7	7	8	60	3rd	Through to Elimination Cook-Off
Ep 19	27 October	The Green Wood												Through to Elimination Cook-Off
Dishes	Starter	Seafood Terrine with Dill Mayonnaise and Homemade Soda Bread												Through to Elimination Cook-Off
Dishes	Main	Wild Boar Ragu with Homemade Pasta, Crispy Fried Apple and Parmesan Salad*												Through to Elimination Cook-Off
Dishes	Dessert	Forest Tart with Wild Forest Berries Chantilly Cream												Through to Elimination Cook-Off

===== Elimination Cook-Off =====
- Episode 20
- Airdate – 28 October
- Description – Laura & Louis and Raechel & Andy were set for an Elimination Cook-Off after their performance in the previous round. They had to use Tamworth Pork as the hero of a starter dish in 45 minutes. For the next challenge, the teams had to cook their signature dish in 90 minutes and were again judged blind by Frances.

Instant Restaurant Summary
Group 1
Team and Episode Details		Michael's Scores		Prue's Scores		Brad's Scores		Total (out of 60)	Result
		Bath blue cheese-based	Signature	Bath blue cheese-based	Signature	Bath blue cheese-based	Signature	Total (out of 60)	Result
Laura & Louis		7	8	8	6	8	7	44	Through to next round
Dishes	Pork-based	Asian Pork Broth with Vermicelli Noodles							Through to next round
Dishes	Signature	Five Spice Duck Breast with Shallot Puree, Fit Tart Tatin and Red Wine and Port Jus							Through to next round
Karen & Alex		2	2	2	5	7	6	25	Eliminated
Dishes	Gooseberries-based	Pork Three Ways with Celeriac Remoulade							Eliminated
Dishes	Signature	Fish and Fennel Stew with Croutons							Eliminated

=== Round 5 ===
==== The Farmer's Choice ====
- Episode 21
- Airdate 31 October
- Description — For the first challenge, the remaining teams had to make a farmer's feast of 50 dishes in two hours. Each team had to choose their Farmer's Chosen box. The two farmer's choice and Judge's Choice winners being safe and the judges weakest scoring team being eliminated. From the eliminated teams in the previous rounds, Razan & Reda were brought back as a wild card.

The Farmer's Choice
Main
Team	Dish	Result
Anna & Faye	Green Breakfast Tortilla with Fresh Berries and White Chocolate	Through to next round
Laura & Louis	Banana Pancakes Sweetcorn Fritters, Streaky Bacon, Gaucemole & Tomato Salsa	Through to next round
Linda & Simon	American Pancakes with Beef Hash and Poached Eggs	Through to next round
Ami & Nikola	Breakfast Bruschetta Two Ways with Mushrooms and Asparagus	Through to next round
Razan & Reda	Falafel and Grilled Halloumi with Homemade Flatbread	Through to next round
Rebecca & Nansai	Exotic Omelette with Shawarma Chicken and Homemade Flatbread	Eliminated
Raechel & Andy	French Toast with Strawberry and Rhubarb Compote	Farmer's Choice
Catherine & Debbie	Shakshuka with Jasmine and Melon and Iced Tea	Judges Choice
Ben & Dan	Saddleback Pancakes with Fried Eggs	Through to next round

=== Round 6 ===
==== Quarter Finals Group A ====
- Episode 22
- Airdate 1 November
- Description — The remaining teams were divided into two groups. The first group had to make a trio of up to 30 canapés each for 40 people in two-and-a-half hours with the guests and judges choosing their favorite. The two least popular went to a Sudden-death Cook-off.

The Farmer's Choice
Main
Team	Dish	Result
Catherine & Debbie	Tequila Prawns with Mango Salsa and Soft Tortilla Wrap; Steak on a Chip with Tarragon Bearnaise; Pink Prosecco Jelly with Summer Fruits	Judges Choice
Ben & Dan	Mini Burger Sliders with Homemade Burger Sauce; BBQ Jalapeño Poppers in Streaky Bacon; Mini Toffee Apples	Through to Elimination Cook-off
Anna & Faye	Pork Lemongrass Skewers with Asian Dipping Sauce; Miso Slaw with Prawn and Chicken Gyoza; Australian Win Set Syrup with Watermelon Granita	Through to Elimination Cook-off
Laura & Louis	Crab Cakes with Dipping Saunce; Chicken Satay with Asian Slaw and Peanut Sauce; Orange Welshcakes with Bitter Chocolate Mousse	People's Choice

===== Elimination Cook-Off =====
- Episode 23
- Airdate – 2 November
- Description – Ben & Dan and Anna & Faye were set for an Elimination Cook-Off after their performance in the previous round. They had to cook three courses with the starter due in 90 minutes the main in 60 minutes and the dessert 30 in minutes.

Instant Restaurant Summary
Group A
Team and Episode Details		Michael's Scores			Prue's Scores			Total (60 out of 100)	Result
Ben & Dan		6	5	5	6	4	5	31	Eliminated
Dishes	Starter	Fresh Devon Mussels with a White Wine Sauce and Bruschetta							Eliminated
Dishes	Main	Asian Pork Belly with Spiced Jus and Pickled Watermelon Salad							Eliminated
Dishes	Dessert	Chocolate Brownie with Bourbon and Vanilla Ice Cream							Eliminated
Anna & Faye		7	6	6	7	5	6	37	Through to next round
Dishes	Starter	Friend Green Basil Ravioli with Tomato Chutney							Through to next round
Dishes	Main	Seared Scallops with Pea and Chilli Risotto and Crispy Prosciutto							Through to next round
Dishes	Dessert	Spiced Poached Pears Duck Breast with a Light Panna Cotta and Vin Santo Syrup							Through to next round

==== Semi Finals Group A Preliminary Elimination ====
- Episode 24
- Airdate 3 November
- Description — The group's remaining three teams (Anna & Faye, Catherine & Debbie and Laura & Louis) faced off in the penultimate semi-finals in a barbecue challenge to cook chicken and pastry in 90 minutes. The least judged team was eliminated and the winner gets immunity into the semi finals. The remaining two teams faced off in an Elimination Cook-Off. They had to cook from the leftovers of the previous challenge with a pastry of their choice.

Semi Finals Group A
Main
Team	Dish	Result
Anna & Faye	Herb Chicken with Rainbow Bulgur Wheat Salad	Through to Elimination Cook-Off
Laura & Louis	Tandoori Chicken with Tarkha Dhal	Through to Elimination Cook-Off
Catherine & Debbie	Peruvian Spiced Chicken with Toasted Corn, Avocado and Quinoa Salad	Through to Semi-Final

Elimination Cook-Off
Group A
Team and Episode Details		Michael's Scores	Prue's Scores	Total (20 out of 100)	Result
	Anna & Faye	8	9	17	Eliminated
Dishes	Main	Chicken Leek and Thyme Pie with Watercress and Bacon Crumb Salad			Eliminated
	Laura & Louis	9	10	19	Through to Semi-Finals
Dishes	Main	Chicken Samosa with Mango Chutney and Mint Coriander and Cucumber Raita			Through to Semi-Finals

==== Semi Finals Group A Elimination ====
- Episode 25
- Airdate 4 November
- Description — The group's remaining teams (Catherine & Debbie and Laura & Louis) faced off in the group semi-finals. They had to make Italian cuisine. The teams 90 minutes for their starters, 60 minutes for the mains and minutes for dessert.

Instant Restaurant Summary
Group 1
Team and Episode Details		Michael's Scores			Prue's Scores			Francesco's Scores			Total (90 out of 60)	Result
Laura & Louis		6	6	7	7	5	7	6	4	6	54	Eliminated
Dishes	Starter	Vegetable Risotto with Parmesan Crisp and Edible Flower										Eliminated
Dishes	Main	Pan Seared Seabass with Stuffed Courgette Flowers, Olive Tapenade and Tomato Sauce										Eliminated
Dishes	Dessert	Almond Panna Cotta with Cherry Sorbet, Cherry Jelly and Honeycombg										Eliminated
Catherine & Debbie		5	7	8	6	8	8	5	7	8	62	Through to Grand Final
Dishes	Starter	Parmesan Baked Ricotta with Marinated Olives and Trio of Breadsticks										Through to Grand Final
Dishes	Main	Lobster Tagliatelle with Tomato Sauce										Through to Grand Final
Dishes	Dessert	Sicilian Lemon Tart with Berry Flavoured Gelato										Through to Grand Final

=== Round 7 ===
==== Quarter Finals Group B ====
- Episode 26
- Airdate 7 November
- Description — The second group had to make one savory and one sweet dish for 50 sixth-grade students in Stoneleigh Abbey. They had two-and-a-half hours preparation time, 30 minutes to serve the savory dish and 30 minutes to serve the sweet dish. The students and judges would pick the two best teams who would be safe from the Elimination Coof-Off.

The Students Choice
Main
Team	Dish		Result
Ami & Nicola	Savory	Turkey Sliders with Sweet Potato Wedges	Students Choice
Ami & Nicola	Sweet	Crazy Popping Sunday	Students Choice
Simon & Linda	Savory	Lean Hotdogs with Homemade Bread and Ketchup	Through to Elimination Cook-off
Simon & Linda	Sweet	Spiced Apple Flapjack	Through to Elimination Cook-off
Razan & Reda	Savory	Chicken and Vegetable Skewer with Salad and Dip	Judges Choice
Razan & Reda	Sweet	Chocolate Orange Truffles	Judges Choice
Raechel & Andy	Savory	Cornflake Chicken with Chips and Homemade Ketchup	Through to Elimination Cook-off
Raechel & Andy	Sweet	Fruit Skewer with Sweet Fritter and Sauce	Through to Elimination Cook-off

===== Elimination Cook-Off =====
- Episode 27
- Airdate – 8 November
- Description – Raechel & Andy and Simon & Linda were set for an Elimination Cook-Off after their performance in the previous round. They had to cook three courses with the starter due in 90 minutes the main in 60 minutes and the dessert 30 in minutes.

Instant Restaurant Summary
Group A
Team and Episode Details		Michael's Scores			Prue's Scores			Total (60 out of 100)	Result
Raechel & Andy		5	6	7	5	8	7	38	Eliminated
Dishes	Starter	English Pea Soup with Parmesan Crisp							Eliminated
Dishes	Main	Rump of Venison with Spiced Red Cabbage and Pomme Purée							Eliminated
Dishes	Dessert	Sticky Toffee Pudding with Toffee Sauce							Eliminated
Simon & Linda		4	7	8	4	8	9	40	Through to next round
Dishes	Starter	Wensleydale and Gruyère Soufflé with Cranberries, Pear and Rocket Salad							Through to next round
Dishes	Main	Trio of Rabbit with Pearl Barley Risotto							Through to next round
Dishes	Dessert	Cry Baby Ice Cream with Homemade Waffle Cone							Through to next round

==== Semi Finals Group B Preliminary Elimination ====
- Episode 28
- Airdate 9 November
- Description — The group's remaining three teams (Simon & Linda, Razan & Reda and Ami & Nicola) faced off in the penultimate semi-finals with a barbecue challenge to cook salmon and pasta in 90 minutes. The least judged team was eliminated and the winner gets immunity into the semi finals. The remaining two teams faced off in an Elimination Cook-Off. They had to cook from the leftovers of the previous challenge with a pastry of their choice.

Semi Finals Group A
Main
Team	Dish	Result
Ami & Nicola	Scandinavian Salmon with Pickled Beetroot, Pickled Cucumber and New Potatoes	Through to Elimination Cook-Off
Simon & Linda	Malaysian Salmon with Sambal Sauce and Nasi Lemak Rice	Through to Semi-Final
Razan & Reda	Grilled Salmon with Green Olives and Harissa Sauce	Through to Elimination Cook-Off

Elimination Cook-Off
Group A
Team and Episode Details		Michael's Scores	Prue's Scores	Total (20 out of 100)	Result
	Ami & Nicola	5	5	17	Through to Semi-Finals****
Dishes	Main	Salmon Ricotta and Dill Ravioli with a Cream Sauce			Through to Semi-Finals****
	Razan & Reda	5	5	19	Eliminated
Dishes	Main	Spicy Salmon Spinach and Ricotta Cannelonni with Salsa			Eliminated

==== Semi Finals Group B Elimination ====
- Episode 29
- Airdate 10 November
- Description — The group's remaining teams (Ami & Nicola and Simon & Linda) faced off in the group semi-finals. They had to make Italian cuisine. The teams 90 minutes for their starters, 60 minutes for the mains and minutes for dessert. The guest judge was blind tasting

Instant Restaurant Summary
Group 1
Team and Episode Details		Michael's Scores			Prue's Scores			Russell's Scores			Total (90 out of 60)	Result
Ami & Nicola		6	7	8	7	8	9	7	8	9	69	Through to Grand Final
Dishes	Starter	Pan Seared Cod with Tomatoes, Butterbeans and Prosciutto Crisp										Through to Grand Final
Dishes	Main	Fig Stuffed Pork with Radicchio Braised Fennel and Balsamic Fig Sauce										Through to Grand Final
Dishes	Dessert	Limoncello and Pistachio Semifredo with Pistachio Semifreddo										Through to Grand Final
Simon & Linda		5	7	5	6	8	5	4	7	5	52	Eliminated
Dishes	Starter	Sardines in Sweet and Sour Sauce with Aubergine Involtini and Homemade Bread										Eliminated
Dishes	Main	Duck Ragu with Pappardelle Pasta; Duck Breast with Apricots										Eliminated
Dishes	Dessert	Prosecco Jelly with Summer Fruits, Mascarpone, Italian Meringue and Coulis										Eliminated

=== Grand Final ===
- Episode 30
- Airdate 11 November
- Description — The finalists (Ami & Nicola and Catherine & Debbie) faced off in the Grand Finals. They had to two hours to prepare the courses and serve their starter, 90 minutes for minutes for main and

Instant Restaurant Summary
Group 1
Team and Episode Details		Michael's Scores			Prue's Scores			Raymond's Scores			Result
Ami & Nicola		-	-	-	-	-	-	-	-	-	Champions
Dishes	Starter	Celebration of Scottish Salmon: Salmon Mousse, Salmon Confit and Roe									Champions
Dishes	Main	Balmoral Steak with Staggis***** Bonbon, Potato Stack and Whisky Cream Sauce									Champions
Dishes	Dessert	Scottish Strawberry Summer's Day: Strawberry Panna Cotta with Champagne Jelly and Chocolate Soil									Champions
Catherine & Debbie		-	-	-	-	-	-	-	-	-	Eliminated
Dishes	Starter	Goat's Cheese and Tomato Terrine with Bloody Mary Sauce									Eliminated
Dishes	Main	Roast Cod with Crispy Potato Nest, Caper Mayonnaise and Pea and Herb Purée									Eliminated
Dishes	Dessert	Strawberry and Elderflower Fraisier with White Chocolate Shard									Eliminated

== Notes ==
* Teams were late to present the dish..
** The team had pre-prepared by hunting their meats and were, thus, given an hour less..
*** Sewin was not available due to the climate, so it was replaced by salmon.
**** With scored tied, the judges evaluated the previous rounds dish for difference.
***** Staggis is colloquially referred to as a steak and haggis.
