= A Girl Called Jules =

1970 film

- Film poster
- Directed by: Tonino Valerii
- Story by: Tonino Valerii; Francesco Mazzei
- Based on: La ragazza di nome Giulio by Milena Milani
- Produced by: Francesco Mazzei
- Starring: Silvia Dionisio; Gianni Macchia; Esmeralda Ruspoli; Anna Moffo
- Cinematography: Stelvio Massi
- Edited by: Franco Fraticelli
- Music by: Riz Ortolani
- Production company: Julia Film
- Distributed by: PAC
- Release date: 26 June 1970 (Italy)
- Running time: 110 minutes
- Country: Italy
- Box office: ₤542.076 million

A Girl Called Jules (Italian: La ragazza di nome Giulio) is a 1970 Italian drama film directed by Tonino Valerii.

== Cast ==
- Silvia Dionisio as Jules
- Gianni Macchia as Franco
- Esmeralda Ruspoli as Laura, mother of Jules
- Anna Moffo as Lia
- Maurizio Degli Esposti as Lorenzo
- John Steiner as the guardian
- Roberto Chevalier as Camillo
- Livio Barbo as Amerigo
- Riccardo Garrone as Carvalli
- Raúl Martínez as Luciano
- Malisa Longo as Serafina
- Nino Nini as priest of Santa Maria del Giglio
- Umberto Raho as Father Dario, the confessor
- Ivano Staccioli as Professor of philosophy
- Tonino Valerii (cameo)

== Production ==
After directing three Spaghetti Western films, director Tonino Valerii was worried about being typecast as a director of only Spaghetti Westerns. He began exploring other genres and was initially interested in adapting Livia De Stefani's novel Black Grapes. The original story of Black Grapes involved gangsters, a topic that became popular in Italy after the release of Damiano Damiani's The Day of the Owl.

Valerii was introduced to producer Francesco Mazzei by Riz Ortolani. When approaching him for Black Grapes, Mazzei countered the offer to film an adaptation of La ragazza di nome Giulio.

Screenplay credits on the actual film prints state that Marcello Coscia, Bruno Di Geronimo, Maurio Di Nardo, Francesco Mazzei and Valerii are responsible for the film's screenplay. Valerii disregarded this stating that these people "did not actually write the film!" and that the film was written by Giuseppe Murgia and Beppe Bellecca.

Joan Fontaine was originally cast to play Laura, the title character's mother, but she left the set a few days before the end of shooting due to economic disagreements with the producer Francesco Mazzei; she was replaced by Esmeralda Ruspoli and all her scenes had to be reshot. The film received mixed reviews.

== Release ==
A Girl Called Jules was distributed theatrically in Italy by PAC where it was first shown in Italy on 26 June 1970. The film grossed a total of 542.076 million Italian lire domestically. It was entered into the 20th Berlin International Film Festival where it was supposed to be screened on the last day of the festival, but the screening was eventually cancelled as the festival was interrupted on 5 July 1970.
