= My Kitchen Rules UK series 1 =

My Kitchen Rules UK
- Series 1
- No. of episodes: 10

Release
- Original network: Sky Living
- Original release: 23 January – 27 March 2014

Series chronology
- Next → Series 2 (2016)

The first season of the British and Irish competitive cooking competition show, My Kitchen Rules, with Irish competitors was derived from the Australian-show of the same name My Kitchen Rules. It premiered on 23 January 2014. Danny & Kev won the inaugural season.

== Teams ==
Region	Members	Relationship	Status
Dublin, Ireland	Claire & Rebecca	Schoolfriends	Eliminated (Round 2)
Essex, The South	Danny & Kev	Firefighters	Winners 27 March (Grand Final)
Liverpool, The North	Steph & Gabbi	Housemates	Eliminated (Round 3)
Derbyshire, The Midlands	Duncan & Stewart	Neighbours	Eliminated (Instant Restaurants)
Newport, Wales	Emma and Phillips	Hairdresser & Client	Runners-up 27 March (Grand Final)
Scotland	Catriona & Alliona	Best Friends	Eliminated (Round 4)

== Elimination history ==
Teams' Competition Progress
Round:		Instant Restaurants	Round 2	Round 3	Round 4	Finale
Round:		1	2	3	4	5
Teams:		Progress				
The South	Danny & Kev	4th (60)	Safe (Sudden-Death)	Safe (Sudden-Death)	Through to Grand Final	Champions (50)
Wales	Emma & Phillip	1st (77)	Immune	Safe (18) (Elimination Cook-Off)	Through to Grand Final (14) (Elimination Cook-Off)	Runners-up (49)
Scotland	Catriona & Alliona	5th (42)	Safe (18) (Breakfast Challenge)	Safe (18) (Barbeque Challenge)	Eliminated (10)	—N/a
The North	Steph & Gabbi	2nd (71)	Safe (12) (Elimination Cook-Off)	Eliminated (15)	—N/a	—N/a
Scotland	Claire & Rebecca	3rd ((66)	Eliminated (11)	—N/a	—N/a	—N/a
The Midlands	Paul & Mel	6th (39)	—N/a	—N/a	—N/a	—N/a

== Competition details ==
=== Instant Restaurants ===
During the Instant Restaurant rounds, each team hosts a three-course dinner for judges and fellow teams. They are scored and ranked among their group and judges, with the lowest scoring team being eliminated.

==== Round 1 ====
- Episodes 1 to 6
- Airdate – 23 January to 27 February
- Description – The first of the two instant restaurant groups are introduced into the competition in Round 1. The lowest scoring team at the end of this round is eliminated.

Instant Restaurant Summary
Group 1
Team and Episode Details		Guest Scores						Jason's Scores			Lorraine's Scores			Total (out of 100)	Rank	Result
Team and Episode Details		C&R	D&K	S&G	D&S	E&P	C&A	Starter	Main	Dessert	Starter	Main	Dessert	Total (out of 100)	Rank	Result
	Claire & Rebecca	—	5	5	7	4	6	5	5	6	6	9	8	66	3rd	Through to Kitchen Headquarters
Ep 1	23 January															Through to Kitchen Headquarters
Dishes	Starter	Sous Vide Salmon on Samphire with Beetroot, Aioli and Balsamic Pearls														Through to Kitchen Headquarters
Dishes	Main	Braised Cheeks of Irish Beef in Stout with Colcannon Potato Cake & Glazed Carrots														Through to Kitchen Headquarters
Dishes	Dessert	Lady's Irish Breakfast: Coffee Chocolate Mousse & Whisky Cream; Lemon Cream & Orange Curd; Shortbread Soldiers														Through to Kitchen Headquarters
	Danny & Kev	4	—	6	6	3	6	5	5	6	6	7	6	60	4th	Through to Kitchen Headquarters
Ep 2	30 January	Scoville Station														Through to Kitchen Headquarters
Dishes	Starter	Thai Fishcakes with Homemade Chilli Jam														Through to Kitchen Headquarters
Dishes	Main	Hot and Sticky Essex Pork Ribs with Straw Potatoes, Bok Choi & Apple Slaw														Through to Kitchen Headquarters
Dishes	Dessert	Chilli Chocolate Mousse Cake with Pistacchio, Raspberry Sauce & Cardamom Cream														Through to Kitchen Headquarters
	Steph & Gabbi	6	4	—	7	6	5	7	6	7	7	7	9	71	2nd	Through to Kitchen Headquarters
Ep 3	6 February	Bocca del Rosa														Through to Kitchen Headquarters
Dishes	Starter	Melanzana alla Parmigiana with Parmesan Shard, Deep-Fried Bocconcini & a Balsamic Reduction														Through to Kitchen Headquarters
Dishes	Main	Trio of Ravioli with different fillings : Italian Sausage Meat, Butternut Squash with Spinach & Mascarpone with Whole Egg Wolk														Through to Kitchen Headquarters
Dishes	Dessert	Zeppolini Piccolini with a Trio of Saunces : Chocolate, Toffee & Custard														Through to Kitchen Headquarters
	Duncan & Stewart	3	1	5	—	2	4	5	4	4	5	3	3	39	6th	Eliiminated
Ep 4	13 February	Belly of the Sun														Eliiminated
Dishes	Starter	Derbyshire Oatcake Cups with Fried Mackerel and Rhubarb Ketchup														Eliiminated
Dishes	Main	Jollof-ish Rice featuring Duncan's Special Seasoning with Citrus & Raisin Spring Greens														Eliiminated
Dishes	Dessert	'Danger High Voltage!'														Eliiminated
	Emma & Phillip	7	5	7	6	—	8	7	9	8	8	6	6	77	1st	Safe
Ep 5	20 February	Once Upon A Time														Safe
Dishes	Starter	Pan Fried Sea Bass on Samphire with a Bisque Sauce														Safe
Dishes	Main	"Three Little Pigs" : Belly of Pork, Pork and Chorizo Balls and Pork Tenderloin with Olive Oil Mash and Red Cabbage														Safe
Dishes	Dessert	Vanilla Panna Cotta with a Caramel Shard														Safe
	Catriona & Allina	3	3	6	5	2	—	3	3	4	4	4	5	42	5th	Through to Kitchen Headquarters
Ep 6	27 February	Pleasure														Through to Kitchen Headquarters
Dishes	Starter	A Stack of Stornaway Black Pudding with a Trio of Fresh Shellfish : Scallops, Cockles and Crab														Through to Kitchen Headquarters
Dishes	Main	Rack of Lamb with a Herby Skirlie Crust on a Bed of Pea and Mint Puree Served with Potato Dauphinoise														Through to Kitchen Headquarters
Dishes	Dessert	"Wee Flamin' Clouties wi' a Shivery Bite Cloutie Dumbling Flambeed in Whiskey with Vanilla Ice Cream														Through to Kitchen Headquarters

=== Round 2 ===
==== Lake District Bed and Breakfast Challenge ====
- Episode 7
- Airdate 6 March
- Description — For the first challenge, all contestants cooked for the general public in the Lake District in the kitchen of a Bed and breakfast for an ultimate breakfast dish to serve 15 Bed and Breakfast owners and their guests. The winner will also be safe from elimination, the Judge's Choice worst dish will go straight to the Elimination Cook-off and the other two teams will face a Sudden-Death Cook-Off. In the Sudden-Death, the two remaining teams had 30 minutes with the same key ingredient, chicken. For the Elimination Cook, the remaining teams had 45 minutes to creates a seafood date. Emma and Phillip had immunity for the episode.

Breakfast challenge
Main
Team	Dish	Result
Steph & Gabbi	Breakfast Hash Sausage Meatballs, Mushrooms, Tomatoes, Cheesy Beans & a Duck Egg	To Elimination Cook Off
Claire & Rebecca	Mexican Breakfast Sweetcorn Fritters, Streaky Bacon, Gaucemole & Tomato Salsa	Through to Sudden-Death Cook Off
Danny & Kev	Breakfast USA Blueberry Pancakes, Crispy Bacon, Honey Yoghurt & Maple Syrupt	Through to Sudden-Death Cook Off
Catriona & Alliona	Scottish Pancake Stack with Fromage Frais and Berries	Safe
Kitchen HQ Sudden-Death Cook-Off
Team	Dish	Result
Claire & Rebecca	Sticky Asian Chicken in Lettuce Cups	To Elimination Cook Off
Danny & Kev	Turkish Chicken Stew with a Flatbread and Herb Salad	Safe

Kitchen HQ Elimination Cook-Off
Team	Jason's Scores	Lorraine's Scores	Dish	Result
Steph & Gabbi	6	6	Oysters Rockefeller Baked with Creamy Spinach and Pancetta	Safe
Claire & Rebecca	6	5	Deconstructed Tuna Nicoise Salad	Eliminated

=== Round 3 ===
==== Camper Van Challenge ====
- Episode 8
- Airdate 13 March
- Description — For the second challenge, the remaining contestants cooked for 40 campers at Sandy Balls. The popular choice was safe from elimination. For the Sudden-Death Cook-Off, the key ingredient was cheese and the two teams had 30 minutes to cook. For the Elimination Cook-Off, the teams had 90 minutes to cook a main course.

Barbecue challenge
Main
Team	Dish	Result
Emma & Phillip	Deep Fried Salmon Ball with Soft Boiled Quail's Egg	To Elimination Cook Off
Steph & Gabbi	Barbecued Quail with Panzanella and Vegetable Crisps	Through to Sudden-Death Cook Off
Danny & Kev	Jerked King Prawns Blueberry Pancakes, Crispy Bacon, Honey Yoghurt & Maple Syrupt	Through to Sudden-Death Cook Off
Catriona & Alliona	Lavendar Lamb with New Potatoes and Asparagus	Safe
Kitchen HQ Sudden-Death Cook-Off
Team	Dish	Result
Steph & Gabbi	Goat's Cheese Bon Bon, Roquefort and Poached Pear and Baked Camembert with Crostini	To Elimination Cook Off
Danny & Kev	Goats' Cheese and Leek Tart with Asparagus Tips, Onion Jam and a Pear and Walnut Salad	Safe

Kitchen HQ Elimination Cook-Off
Team	Jason's Scores	Lorraine's Scores	Dish	Result
Emma & Phillip	9	9	Pan Friend Hake with Potato Rösti, Pea Puree with Pancetta and Fennel Veloute	Safe
Steph & Gabbi	7	8	Squid Ink Tagilioini with Clams, Razor Clams and Mussels and Riccotta Stuffed Courgette Flower	Eliminated

=== Round 4 ===
==== Swanky Soiree Challenge ====
- Episode 9
- Airdate 20 March
- Description — For the third challenge, the remaining contestants cooked for 30 VIPs (relatives and friends of the contestans) at Grove House in four and a half hours. The guests scored each team out of 10, including the judges. The popular choice went straight to the Grand Final. For the Elimination Cook-Off, the remaining two teams had to make a trio of desserts.

VIP challenge
Main
Team	Guests	Jason's Scores	Lorraine's Scores	Dish	Result
Emma & Phillip	8	7	7	Surf and turf with Soft Boiled Quail's Egg	To Elimination Cook Off
Danny & Kev	7	9	9	Smoked Saddles of Lamb Blueberry Pancakes, Crispy Bacon, Honey Yoghurt & Maple Syrup	Through to Grand Final
Catriona & Alliona	6	7	8	Seafood Symphony with New Potatoes and Asparagus	To Elimination Cook Off

Kitchen HQ Elimination Cook-Off
Team	Jason's Scores	Lorraine's Scores	Dish	Result
Emma & Phillip	7	7	Raspberry Mousse; Lemon Creme Brulee; Frangipane Tart	Through to Grand Final
Catriona & Alliona	5	5	Summer Fruit Pavlova; Dark Chocolate Mousse; Strawberry Shortbread	Eliminated

=== Finale ===
- Episode 10
- Airdate 27 March, 2014
- Description — For the starter, only one teammate could cook in one hour. For the mains, they teams had to make six dishes for the other prior competitors in 90 minutes. They had 90 minutes to make dessert.

Grand Final
Starter
Team	Jason's Scores	Lorraine's Scores	Dish
Emma & Phillip	7	7	Lobster Tail on Zabaglioni and Crab-Filled Parmesan Basket
Danny & Kev	8	8	Trio of Black Pudding with Scallop, Quails' Egg, Pancetta and Apple Sauce

Grand Final
Mains
Team	Guests	Jason's Scores	Lorraine's Scores	Dish
Emma & Phillip	7	7	7	Duck Breasts with a Port and Blackberry Sauce, Celeriac Cream and Fondant Potatoes
Danny & Kev	6	5	5	Seafood Medley with Homemade Pasta, Rainbow Tomatoes, Basil and Chilli Saunce

Grand Final
Dessert
Team	Jason's Scores	Lorraine's Scores	Dish	Result
Emma & Phillip	7	7	Coffee Mocha Pot; Mexican Churros; Irish Cream Ice Cream	Eliminated
Danny & Kev	9	9	Poached Pear with Pear Wafer; Filo Basket with Ice Cream; Chocolate Mousee with Honeycomb	Winner
