= Wahaca =

Mexican-style street food restaurant group in the United Kingdom

Oaxaca Ltd.
- Trade name: Wachaca
- Industry: Restaurant
- Founded: August 2007; 19 years ago
- Founder: Thomasina Miers; Mark Selby
- Headquarters: London, England, UK
- Number of locations: 14 (2025)
- Website: www.wahaca.co.uk

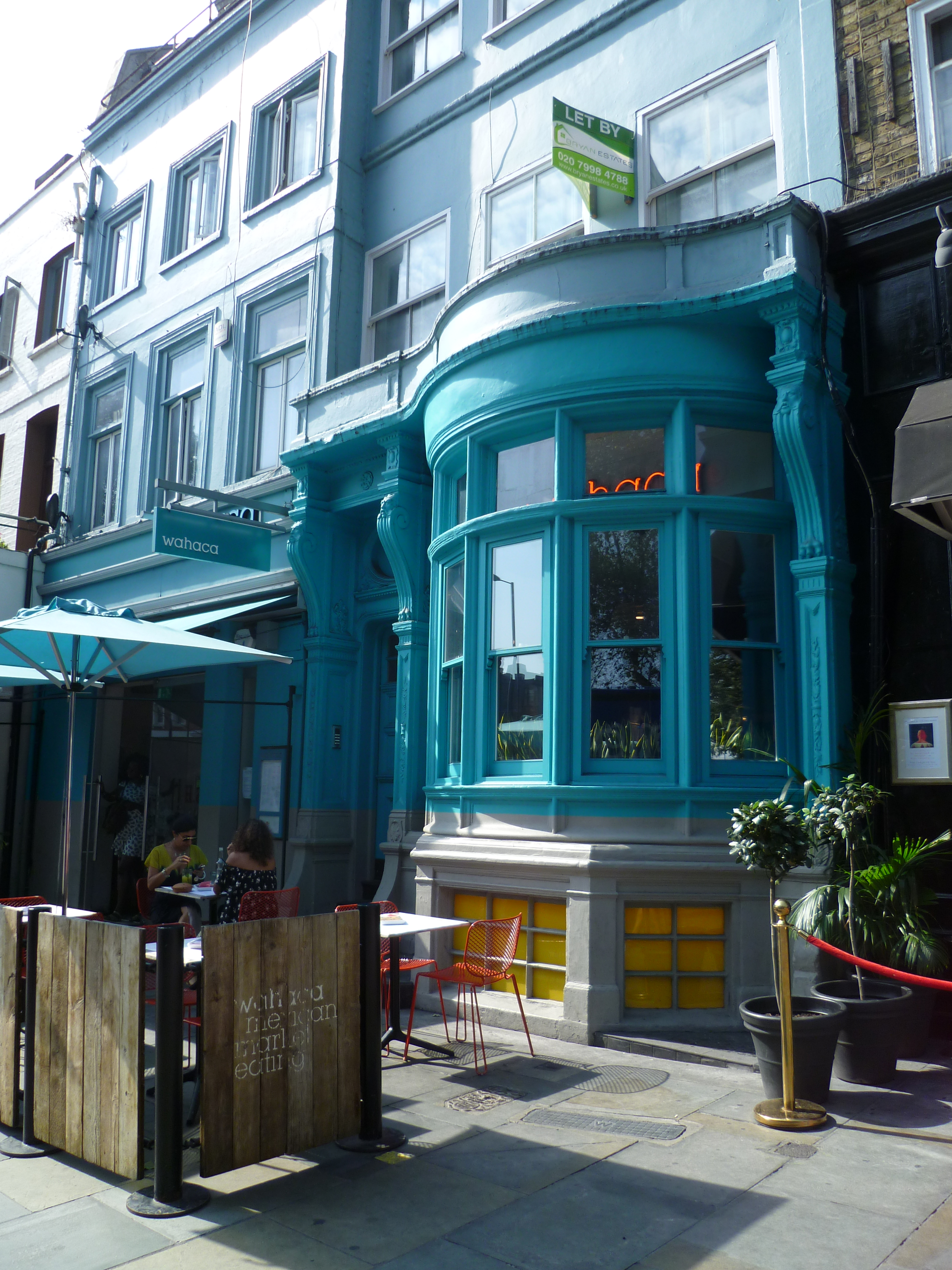
Wahaca, Islington, 2016

Wahaca (legally incorporated as Oaxaca Ltd.) is a restaurant group selling Mexican-style street food, co-founded by Thomasina Miers, based in London, England. Wahaca is a phonetic spelling of the Mexican State of Oaxaca.

== History ==
Miers opened the first branch in Chandos Place, London in August 2007, focused on Mexican street food. In October 2008 a second Wahaca opened at Westfield in London. Two further branches in Canary Wharf and Soho followed in 2011, and Wahaca launched its first mobile street kitchen. In 2012 it opened its Top One Wahaca Southbank Experiment.

In 2014 the company launched a fast food-style brand, DF Tacos, which operated restaurants and at food halls. These closed in 2025.

In September 2015 Wahaca opened its first restaurant in the north west, based in Manchester.

In July 2016 Wahaca launched its "at home" range.

In October 2016, Wahaca opened its first restaurant in Scotland, in central Edinburgh.

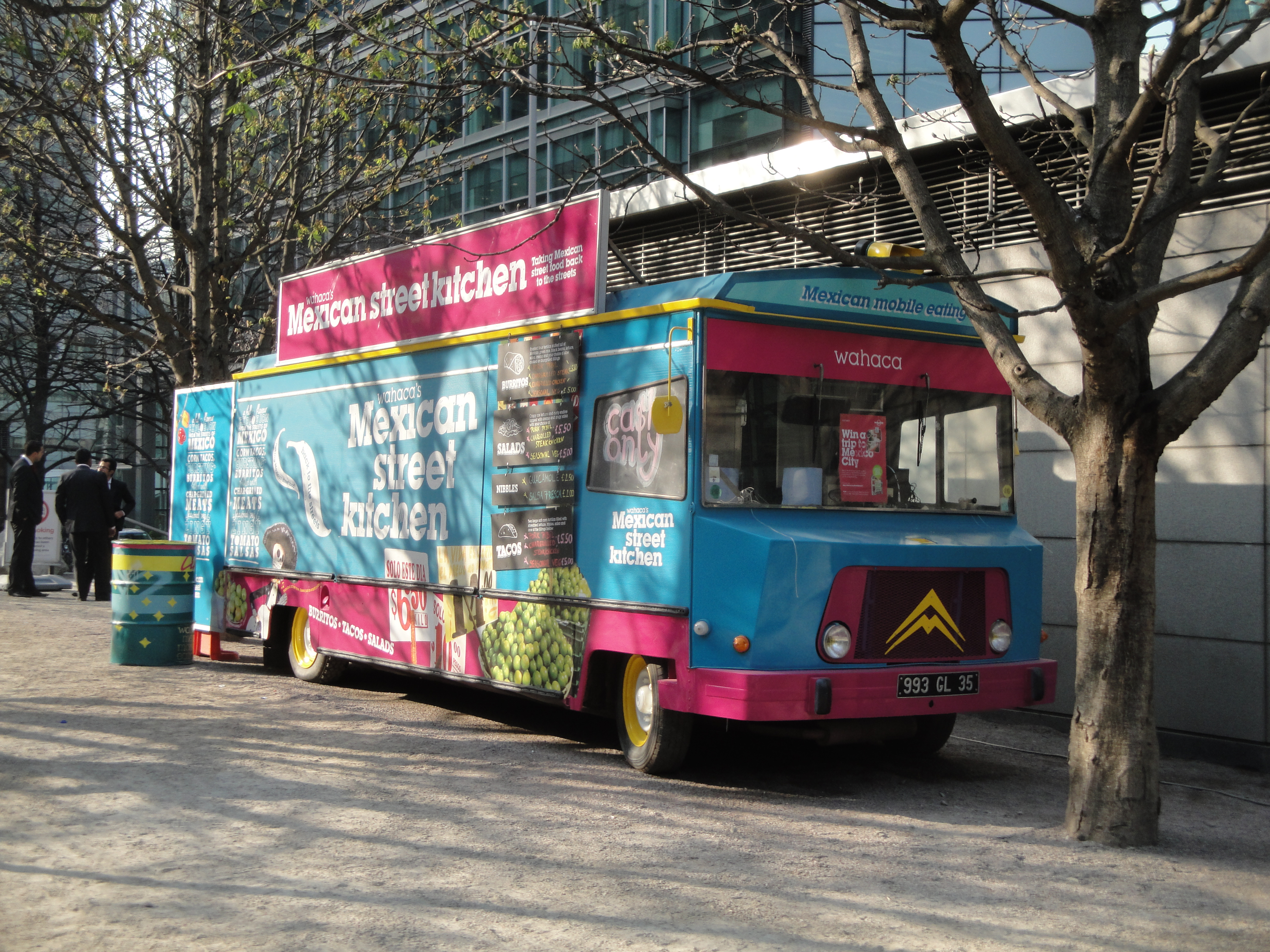
Wahaca mobile street kitchen, 2012

As of December 2017, Wahaca had 25 branches, up from 19 branches in September 2015. They also had three bars and two street kitchen locations.

In November 2017, Wahaca used the Mexican holiday Day of the Dead as the basis for a three-day festival to promote their business.

In August 2020, Wahaca announced that it would close ten of its 28 restaurants due to a downturn in business caused by the coronavirus pandemic. As part of the restructuring the following Wahaca restaurants were permanently closed: Bluewater (Kent), Bristol, Brixton (London), Charlotte Street (London), Chichester, Manchester, Liverpool, Kentish Town (London), Southampton, and St Paul’s (London).

In November 2020, Dick Enthoven, owner of Nandos, bought a £4m majority stake in Wahaca's parent company, Oaxaca Ltd. Wahaca entered into a Company Voluntary Arrangement (CVA), in which shareholders and lenders agreed to write off £25m of debt while injecting £5m into the restaurant chain.

In April 2023, Wahaca announced that it would no longer serve steak with a view to reducing its carbon footprint.

== Awards ==
Wahaca has won awards for its food, design, and sustainability. In 2016, co-founders Mark Selby and Thomasina Miers were voted restaurateurs of the year by Caterer Magazine.

In 2016, Wahaca became the first restaurant group in the UK to be certified as carbon neutral.

== Norovirus outbreak ==
In November 2016, Wahaca restaurants primarily in London, but also in other locations including Manchester, were suspected as the source of a norovirus outbreak leading to 1000 people falling ill, with symptoms including vomiting. In response, Wahaca temporarily closed nine outlets and apologised to those who had been unwell.

== Employment rights ==
In June 2019, Wahaca was criticised for making serving staff pay part of the bills of customers who left without paying. Following a backlash on social media, they changed the policy.

== See also ==
- O'Tacos
