= Gizzi Erskine =

English chef and TV personality

The Honourable Gizzi Erskine
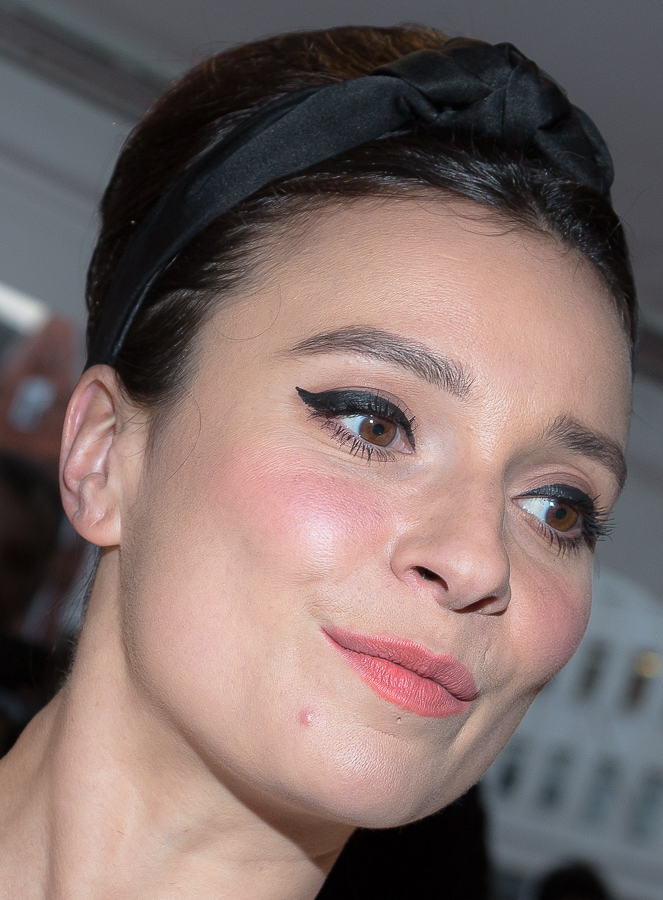
- Gizzi Erskine at the Glamour Awards in 2015
- Born: Griselda Maxwell Erskine; 20 August 1979 (age 46); Wandsworth
- Education: Leiths School of Food and Wine
- Occupations: Chef, TV personality, food writer
- Television: Cook Yourself Thin; Cookery School; Drop Down Menu; The Ones To Watch; 12 Again; Cooks to Market

The Honourable Griselda "Gizzi" Maxwell Erskine (born 20 August 1979) is an English chef and TV personality.

== Early years ==
Erskine was born in Wandsworth, to photographer Iain Maxwell Erskine, 2nd Baron Erskine of Rerrick (1926-1995), and his second wife, model and actress Maria Josephine (daughter of Dr Josef Klupt, of Richmond, Surrey). She was the second of three daughters.

== Career ==
She trained at Leiths School of Food and Wine in London.

Erskine presented two seasons of Channel 4's cookery show Cook Yourself Thin and presented Channel 4's daytime programme Cookery School in 2011. She has also presented cookery features for ITV1's This Morning, contributed to Healthy Food Guide magazine and appeared on Sky1's Taste. She now co-presents channel 4's cookery programme Drop Down Menu with Matt Tebbutt. She has also appeared on other TV shows, including Cooks To Market and Iron Chef on Channel 4. As a food writer, her books include Kitchen Magic and Skinny Weeks and Weekend Feasts.

On 14 July 2013, she joined The Sunday Times as the Sunday Times Cook in the newspaper's weekly magazine.

Erskine is co-host of the podcast Sex, Lies and DM Slides, along with Sydney Lima. Each week celebrity guests are invited to open up their social media DM boxes.

== Bibliography ==
Cookbooks

- Gizzi's Kitchen Magic (2010)
- My Kitchen Table: 100 Foolproof Suppers (2012)
- Skinny Weeks and Weekend Feasts (2013)
- Gizzi's Healthy Appetite (2015)
- Gizzi's Season's Eatings (2016)
- Slow - Food worth taking time over (2018)
- Restore (2020)
