= Baron Erskine of Rerrick =

Extinct barony in the Peerage of the United Kingdom

Baron Erskine of Rerrick, of Rerrick in Kirkcudbrightshire, was a title in the Peerage of the United Kingdom. It was created in 1964 for Sir John Erskine, 1st Baronet, who served as Governor of Northern Ireland from 1964 to 1968. He had already been created a baronet in the Baronetage of the United Kingdom on 5 July 1961. He was succeeded by his son, the second Baron. On his death in 1995 both titles became extinct. The second Baron was father of chef and television personality Griselda ('Gizzi') Maxwell Erskine.

== Barons Erskine of Rerrick (1964) ==
- John Maxwell Erskine, 1st Baron Erskine of Rerrick (1893–1980)
- Iain Maxwell Erskine, 2nd Baron Erskine of Rerrick (1926–1995)
