= My Kitchen Rules (British TV series) =

- Genre: Cooking show
- Judges: Lorraine Pascale (2014); Jason Atherton (2014); Michael Caines (2016); Prue Leith (2016); Glynn Purnell (2017); Rachel Allen (2017)
- Narrated by: Hugh Dennis (2014); Mark Benton (2016–17)
- Country of origin: United Kingdom
- Original language: English
- No. of series: 3
- No. of episodes: 80

Production
- Running time: 60 minutes (inc. adverts)
- Production companies: Boundless (2014); 7Wonder Productions (2016–17)

Original release
- Network: Sky Living (2014); Channel 4 (2016–17)
- Release: 23 January 2014 – 17 November 2017

Related
- My Kitchen Rules

My Kitchen Rules is a British cooking show that first aired on Sky Living from 23 January to 27 March 2014 and then on Channel 4 from 3 October 2016 to 17 November 2017.

== Transmissions ==
Series	Start date	End date	Episodes
1	23 January 2014	27 March 2014	10
2	3 October 2016	11 November 2016	30
3	25 September 2017	17 November 2017	40
