= Thomasina Miers =

English cook, writer and television presenter (born 1976)

Thomasina Miers OBE
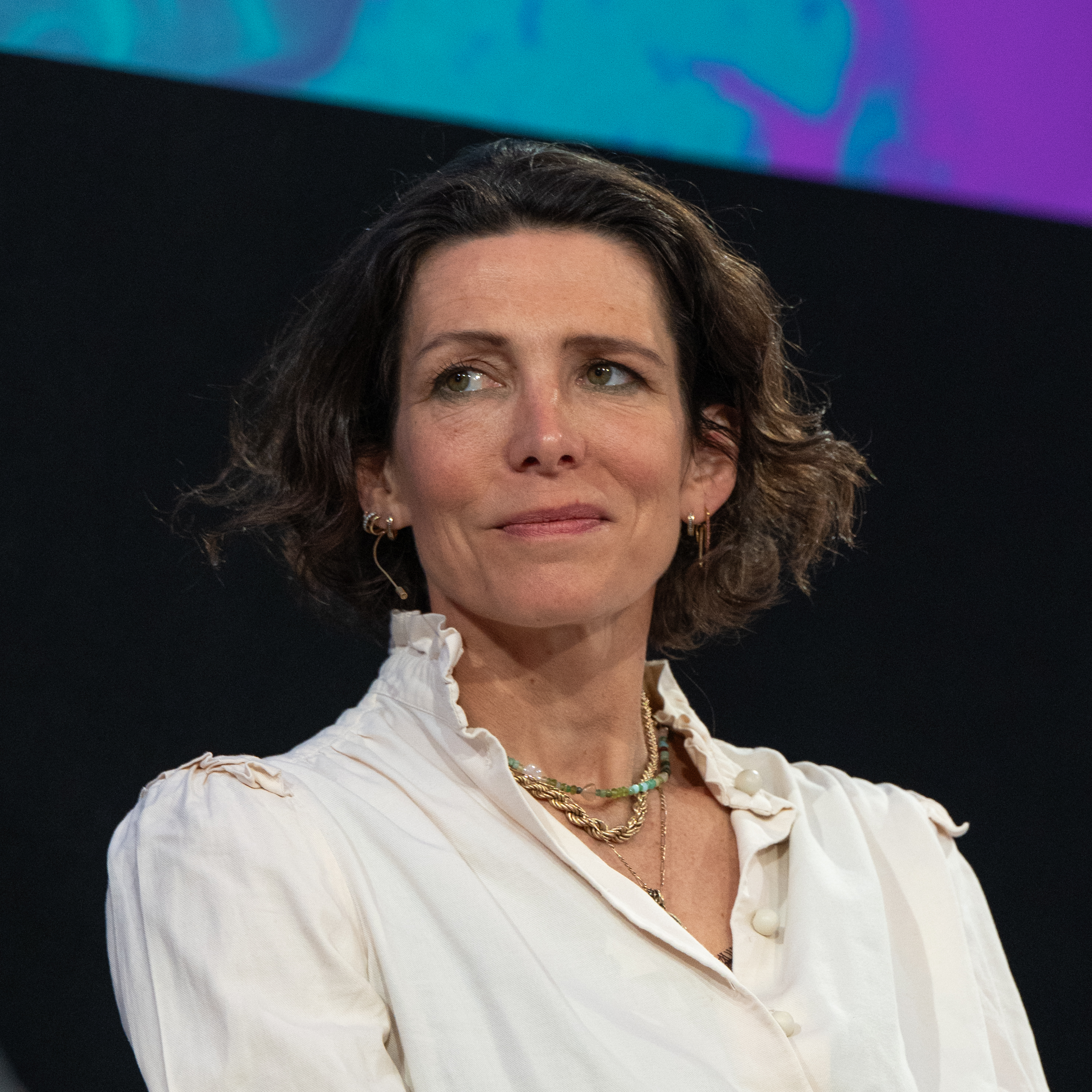
- At SXSW London, June 2026
- Born: February 1976 (age 50); Cheltenham, Gloucestershire, England
- Education: St Paul's Girls' School
- Alma mater: Ballymaloe Cookery School
- Occupations: cook, writer and television presenter
- Known for: Founder of Wahaca; Winner of UK Masterchef (2005)
- Spouse: Mark Williams
- Children: 3 daughters

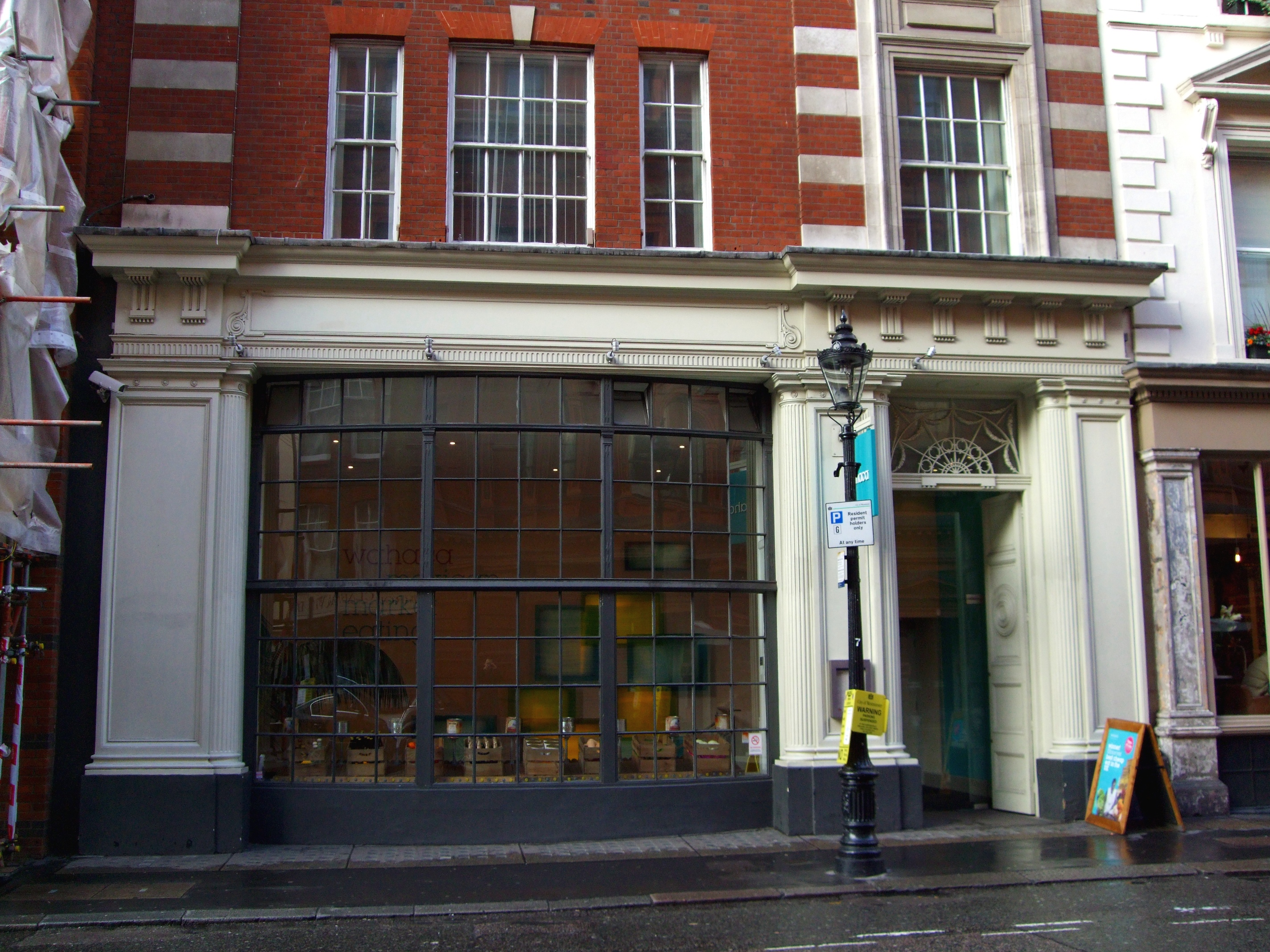
Wahaca, Covent Garden, 2008

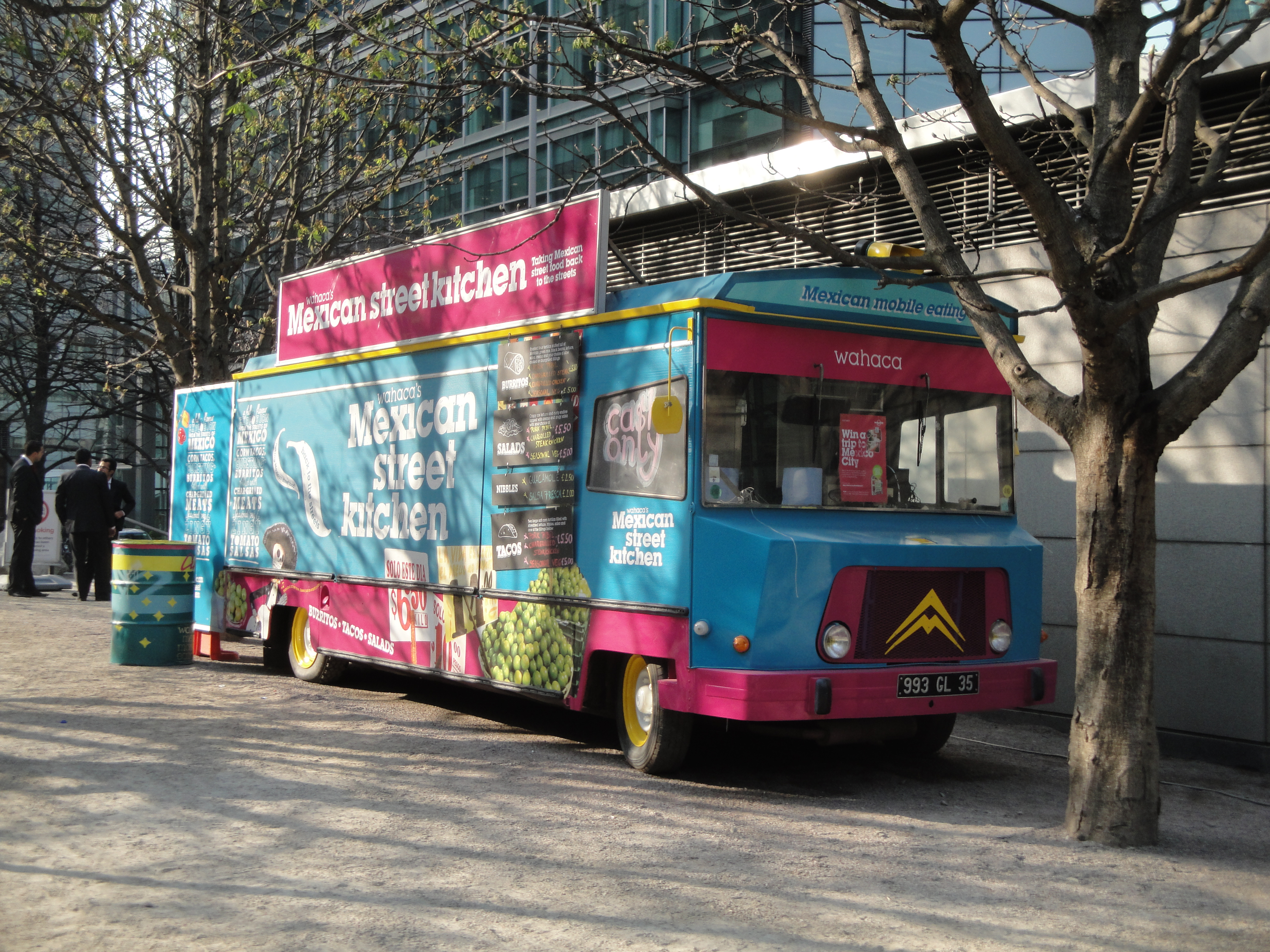
Wahaca mobile street kitchen, 2012

Thomasina Jean Miers, OBE (born February 1976) is an English cook, writer and television presenter. She is the co-founder of the Wahaca chain of Mexican street food restaurants.

== Early life ==
Thomasina Jean Miers was born in February 1976 in Cheltenham, the daughter of (Michael) Probyn Miers, a joiner and furniture maker, formerly a management consultant and Niki Miers, of Guiting Power, Cheltenham. She grew up in "a big rambling house" at Acton, West London. The Miers family, landed gentry originally of Aldingham, Cumbria (then in Lancashire), owned the Ynyspenllwch estate in Glamorganshire until the time of her grandfather, Commander Richard Eustace Probyn Miers, RN. Miers has a twin brother, Dighton, and a sister, Talulah.

She was educated at St Paul's Girls' School, studied modern languages at the University of Edinburgh and studied at Ballymaloe Cookery School. She worked as a freelance cook and writer, with influences from time spent in Mexico.

== Career ==
In 2005, Miers won the BBC TV cookery competition MasterChef, "impressing judges John Torode and Gregg Wallace with her bold and, at times, eccentric cooking style".

She has made two series of cookery programmes for Channel 4 with co-presenter Guy Grieve: Wild Gourmets in 2007 and A Cook's Tour of Spain in 2008. In 2011, she presented Mexican Food Made Simple for Channel 5.

She is co-editor with Annabel Buckingham of the cookbook Soup Kitchen (with an introduction by Hugh Fearnley-Whittingstall). She has also written Cook: Smart Seasonal Recipes for Hungry People, The Wild Gourmets: Adventures in Food and Freedom, with Guy Grieve, and Mexican Food Made Simple.

Miers co-founded Wahaca, which became a chain of Mexican "street food" restaurants, alongside Mark Selby in 2006. The company opened its first restaurant in London's Covent Garden in August 2007 and in October 2008 a second opened at Westfield London. Wahaca launched their first mobile kitchen in 2011, selling Mexican street food on the streets of London. By the end of 2017 Wahaca had 25 branches, and in January 2021 there were 13.

== Personal life ==
Miers is married to Mark Williams, a fund manager at Liontrust Asset Management and they have three daughters. The family live near Queen's Park.

In January 2019, Miers was made an Officer of the Order of the British Empire (OBE) for services to the food industry; she received the honour from the Duke of Cambridge later in the year at an investiture ceremony at Buckingham Palace.

== Books ==
- The Wild Gourmets: Adventures in Food and Freedom (3 September 2007) ISBN 9780747591573 co-author Guy Grieve
- Wahaca – Mexican Food Made Simple (4 March 2010) ISBN 9780340994979
- Wahaca – Mexican Food at Home (21 June 2012) ISBN 9781444722390
- Chilli Notes (8 May 2014) ISBN 9781444776881
- Cantina: Recipes from a Mexican Kitchen (1 November 2014) ISBN 978-1742703992
- Home Cook (2 March 2017) ISBN 9781783350964
- Meat-Free Mexican (5 May 2022) ISBN 9781529371840
- Mexican Table (21 August 2025) ISBN 9781837833900

Preceded by Rosa Baden-Powell	Masterchef UK champion 2005	Succeeded by Peter Bayless
