= Glynn Purnell =

English chef, restaurateur and television personality

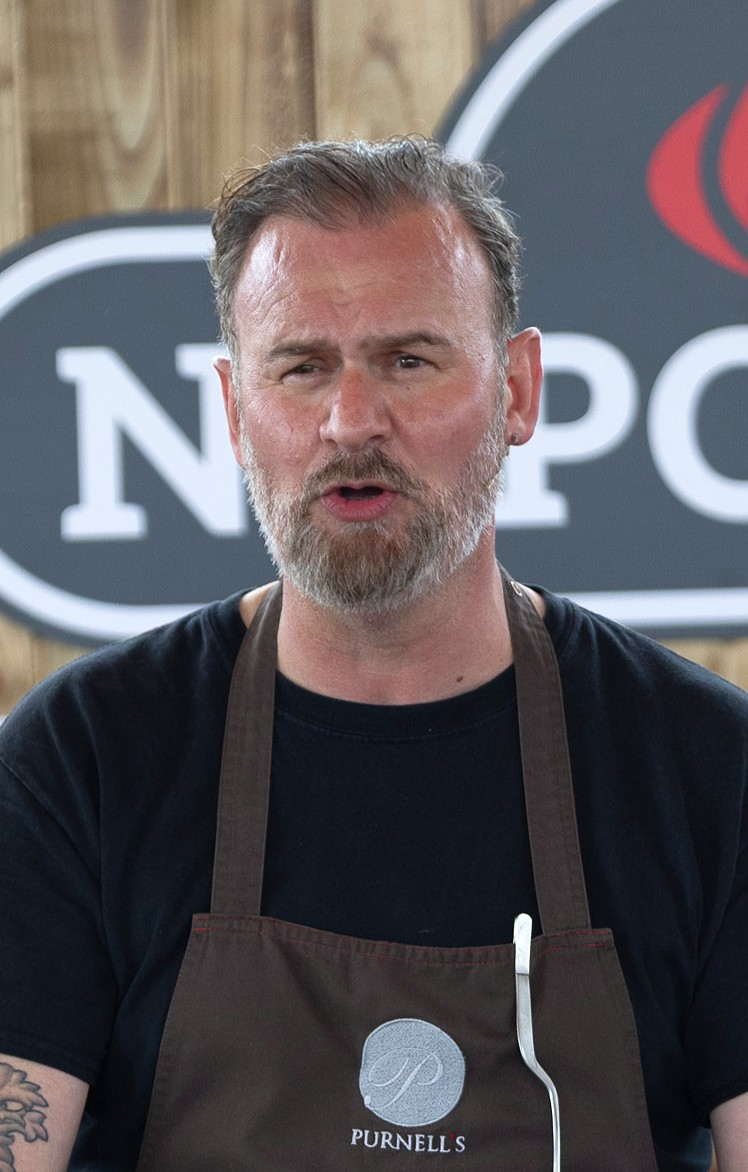
- Purnell in 2025
- Born: January 1975 (age 51); Chelmsley Wood, Solihull, England
- Children: 3
- Culinary career
- Cooking style: Modern British
- Current restaurant(s): Trillium Plates by Purnell's
- Previous restaurant(s): Jessica's Purnell's The Asquith The Mount by Glynn Purnell
- Television show: Great British Menu
- Award won: Michelin star

Glynn Purnell (born January 1975) is an English chef, restaurateur and television personality from Solihull. Formerly head chef at Jessica's, he is the proprietor of The Mount by Glynn Purnell and Plates by Purnell and was until 2024 head chef at Purnell's. Both Jessica's and Purnell's were awarded a Michelin star.

== Early life ==
Purnell was born in Chelmsley Wood, a large council estate in north Solihull; the Birmingham Post has described him as "undoubtably the finest chef to hail from Chelmsley Wood", and he calls himself the "Yummy Brummie". His father worked in a factory, and his mother was a dinner lady. One of four children, when he was young he used to cook for his younger brother and sister, feeding them beans on toast with curry powder and chopped onions. His first experience working in a kitchen was when he did work experience at the Metropole Hotel at Birmingham's National Exhibition Centre at the age of 14; when he left school, he returned there for a six-year apprenticeship.

== Career ==
=== Chef ===
Purnell's career in fine dining started in 1996 when he joined Andreas Antona at Simpsons restaurant, then based in Kenilworth, Warwickshire, as chef de partie. While there he worked on placements with other notable chefs including Gordon Ramsay and Gary Rhodes, and at restaurants in Lyon, Montpellier and the Basque Country. In 2002 he worked for six months as sous chef at Claude Bosi's Hibiscus restaurant in Ludlow, Shropshire.

In 2003 Purnell was appointed to his first head chef role at Jessica's in Edgbaston, Birmingham, which in 2005 was awarded the first Michelin star given to a Birmingham restaurant and the same year was also named English Restaurant of the Year by the AA.

Purnell left Jessica's in 2007 and opened his own restaurant, Purnell's in Cornwall Street, in Birmingham city centre. Purnell's was awarded a Michelin star in January 2009, and itself won the AA Restaurant of the Year award in September of the same year. The restaurant also won the Square Meal Best Restaurant of the Year Award in 2012.

In August 2010 it was announced that Purnell would be opening a second restaurant, The Asquith, an "ambitious, neighbourhood restaurant", in the premises of the former Jessica's in Edgbaston. The Asquith closed in April 2011 due to a dispute with the building's landlord, and in 2015 the building was converted to residential use. Purnell subsequently opened The Mount by Glynn Purnell, a gastropub in Henley-in-Arden, and Plates by Purnell's, a tapas restaurant, in Birmingham.

Purnell's closed in October 2024 due to reduced bookings, leading to complaints about worthless vouchers.

In December 2025, Glynn Purnell opened a new restaurant in Birmingham, Trillium Restaurant, in collaboration with Phil Innes from Loki Wine, a local wine merchant.. Purnell leads the kitchen as Chef Patron, supported by a team headed by Head Chef Rob Palmer, Sous Chef Andrew Kay, and Junior Sous Chef Morgan Williams.

The restaurant offers refined cuisine in a relaxed, contemporary format, with sharing-style dishes providing an alternative to traditional tasting menus, with wine as a central component of the dining experience.

Trillium has received positive reviews from critics, including The Guardian and Coravin, which awarded the restaurant two glasses.

The Mount by Glynn Purnell closed following a final service on 15 March 2026, with industry reports citing rising running costs, including food prices and energy bills, as making the site unviable.

=== Television ===
Purnell is a regular presenter and chef on the BBC show Saturday Kitchen. He has also appeared as judge on Come Dine With Me - Champion of Champions, and featured on Secret Kitchen and Great British Menu. In 2017, he helmed 40 episodes of My Kitchen Rules for its third series.

=== Books ===
Purnell's 2014 Cracking Yolks & Pig Tales combines recipes with personal reminiscences, and was followed by two further cookery books, Rib Ticklers and Choux-ins (2016) and A Purnell's Journey: There and Back Again (2020). He has also published two children's books, The Magical Adventures of Whoops the Wonder Dog (2018) and Arnold the Alpaca (2021).

== Personal life ==
Purnell has three children.
