= Prue Leith =

South African-British chef, broadcaster, and writer (born 1940)

Dame Prue Leith DBE
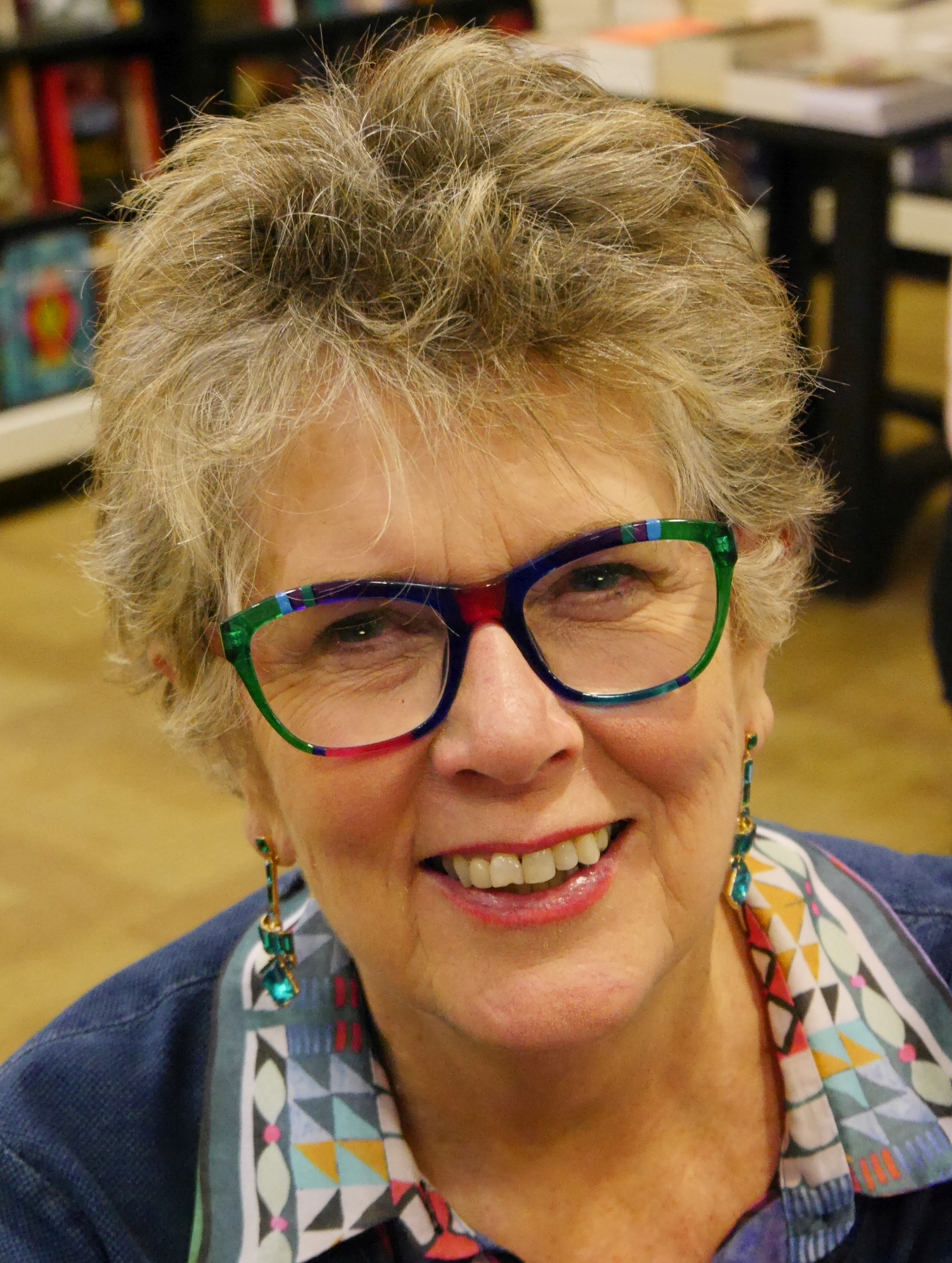
- Leith in 2018
- Born: Prudence Margaret Leith; 18 February 1940 (age 86); Cape Town, South Africa
- Citizenship: South Africa; United Kingdom
- Education: University of Cape Town
- Occupations: Restaurateur; broadcaster; cookery writer; novelist; television personality; businesswoman
- Television: The Great British Menu (2006–2016); My Kitchen Rules (2016); The Great British Bake Off (2017–2025); Junior Bake Off (2019)
- Spouses: Rayne Kruger (m. 1974; died 2002); John Playfair (m. 2016)
- Children: 2, including Danny Kruger
- Relatives: Sam Leith (nephew)

Dame Prudence Margaret Leith (born 18 February 1940) is a South African and British restaurateur, broadcaster, cookery writer, businesswoman, television personality, novelist, chef, and former university chancellor.

Leith was a judge on BBC Two's Great British Menu for eleven years, from 2005-16. She left it to join The Great British Bake Off in March 2017, replacing Mary Berry as a judge, when the television programme moved to Channel 4. She remained a judge until 2025. She was Chancellor of Queen Margaret University, Edinburgh from 2016 to 2024.

== Early life ==
Leith was born on 18 February 1940 in Cape Town, then Cape Province, now Western Cape, South Africa.

== Career ==
In 1960, Leith moved to London to attend the Cordon Bleu Cookery School and then began a business supplying high-quality business lunches. This grew to become Leith's Good Food, a party and event caterer. In 1969, she opened Leith's, her Michelin-starred restaurant in Notting Hill, eventually selling it in 1995. In 1975, she founded Leith's School of Food and Wine, which trains professional chefs and amateur cooks. The group reached a turnover of £15 million in 1993. She sold it and, in 1995, helped found the Prue Leith College, since renamed Prue Leith Chef's Academy, and Prue Leith Culinary Institute in South Africa. Odd Plate Restaurant was renamed Prue Leith's Restaurant.

The first woman appointed to the British Railways Board in 1980, Leith set about improving its much-criticised catering. The catering division, Travellers Fare, was detached from the hotels business in 1982 with outlets created, including Casey Jones and Upper Crust. Leith left British Rail in September 1985.

Concurrently with running her business, Leith became a food columnist for, successively, the Daily Mail, Sunday Express, The Guardian and the Daily Mirror. Aside from writing 12 cookery books, including Leith's Cookery Bible, she has written eight novels: Leaving Patrick, Sisters, A Lovesome Thing, Choral Society, A Serving of Scandal, The Food of Love: Laura's Story, The Prodigal Daughter, and The Lost Son. The last three form the Angelotti Chronicles or Food of Love trilogy. Her memoir, Relish, was published in 2013.

Her first television appearance was in the 1970s as a presenter of two 13-episode magazine series aimed at women at home, made by Tyne Tees Television. She was a last-minute replacement for Jack de Manio, and with no experience and a director who liked everything scripted, including interviews, she disliked the experience. Later, in the 1980s, she was the subject of two television programmes about her life and career: the first episode of Channel 4's Take Six Cooks and the BBC's The Best of British, a series about young entrepreneurs. In 1999, she was one of the Commissioners on Channel 4's Poverty Commission. She returned to television to be a judge on The Great British Menu for 11 years until 2016 and a judge for My Kitchen Rules, which she left to replace Mary Berry in The Great British Bake Off. In January 2026, She announced her retirement from the Bake Off in an instagram post.

She has been involved in food in education. When chair of the Royal Society of Arts she founded and chaired the charity Focus on Food (now part of the Soil Association) which promotes cooking in the curriculum. She also started, with the charity Training for Life, the Hoxton Apprentice; a not-for-profit restaurant which for ten years trained the most disadvantaged long-term unemployed young people. Until 2015, she was a member of the Food Strand of the grant-giving foundation, Esmée Fairbairne. From 2007 to 2010, she was the Chair of the School Food Trust, the government quango largely responsible for the improvement in school food after Jamie Oliver's television exposé of the poor state of school dinners. The Trust (now the Children's Food Trust) also set up and runs Let's Get Cooking, an organisation of over 5,000 cooking clubs in state schools, of which she is a patron. She is vice-president of The Sustainable Restaurant Association; a trustee of Baby Taste Journey (an education charity concerned with healthy food for infants); Patron of The Institute for Food, Brain and Behaviour, Sustain's Campaign for Better Hospital Food, and the Prue Leith Chef's Academy in her native South Africa.

She has also been active in general education, chairing Ashridge Management College (2002–07); 3E's Enterprises (an education company turning round failing schools and managing academies (1998–2006) and Chairman of Governors at the secondary school Kings College in Guildford (2000–07).

She has also been involved in many diverse organisations: she chaired the Restaurateurs Association (1990–94); she was a member of the Investors in People working group; she chaired the Royal Society of Arts (RSA; 1995–97); and Forum for the Future (2000–03). She was a director of the housing association, Places for People (1999–2003) and a member of the Consumer Debt Working Group that contributed to the Conservative Party's 2006 policy document Breakdown Britain (2004–05). She has also been one of the voices in favour of Brexit, defending her choice, although lately voicing concern over lowering of food standards.

While at the RSA, she led the successful campaign to use the empty plinth, now known as the Fourth Plinth, in Trafalgar Square to house changing sculptures or installations by the best contemporary artists.

Leith has been a non-executive director of British Rail; British Transport Hotels; Safeway; Argyll plc, the Leeds Permanent Building Society; Whitbread plc; Woolworths plc; the Halifax; Triven VCT; Omega International plc; and Belmond Hotels Ltd (formerly Orient Express Hotels) and is a director and investor in several start-up companies.

In July 2017, she was installed as the Chancellor of Queen Margaret University, Edinburgh.

In December 2021, she was the castaway on BBC Radio 4's Desert Island Discs.

In February 2024, Leith's ten-part cookery series Prue Leith's Cotswold Kitchen began airing on ITV1. Following a second series in 2025, a third series began airing in early 2026.

In 2025, Leith participated in the sixth series of The Masked Singer as "Pegasus". She was eliminated in the second episode.

== Personal life ==
Leith holds dual South African and British citizenship.

=== Family ===
Leith was married to property developer and author Rayne Kruger from 1974 until his death aged 80 in December 2002. The couple had two children, a son and a daughter. Their daughter, Li-Da Kruger (a Cambodian adoptee), is a filmmaker. Their son, Danny Kruger, was a speechwriter and adviser to David Cameron, and is the MP for the constituency of East Wiltshire for Reform UK, having left the Conservative Party on 15 September 2025.

In October 2016, Leith married John Playfair, a retired clothes designer; the couple originally lived in separate homes, but have subsequently built a house together in Moreton-in-Marsh, Gloucestershire, where they both live.

Leith's brother, ex-restaurateur James Leith, is married to the biographer Penny Junor.

== Political views ==
Leith voted for Brexit, saying she "dithered and dithered for ages because there were really good arguments on both sides".

In May 2020, Leith expressed support for the breach of the COVID-19 lockdown by Dominic Cummings and his wife Mary Wakefield, whom her son described as "old friends".

=== Campaigning for assisted dying ===
Leith's other brother, David, who had worked for the RAF and also for Prue Leith's Good Food, died from bone cancer in 2012, aged 74, in conditions described by her as "absolute agony". After his death, Leith started campaigning for making assisted dying legal in Britain. In 2023, she filmed a documentary for Channel 4 with her son Danny, who has opposite views on the subject. She is a Patron of Dignity in Dying and, in 2023, spoke in Parliament on the subject.

== Honours ==
Leith holds thirteen honorary degrees or fellowships from British universities.

She was appointed an Officer of the Order of the British Empire (OBE) in 1989, a Commander of the Order of the British Empire (CBE) in the 2010 Birthday Honours and a Dame Commander of the Order of the British Empire (DBE) in the 2021 Birthday Honours for services to food, broadcasting and charity.

She received the Veuve Clicquot Business Woman of the Year Award in 1990.
