= Francesco Mazzei =

Italian chef

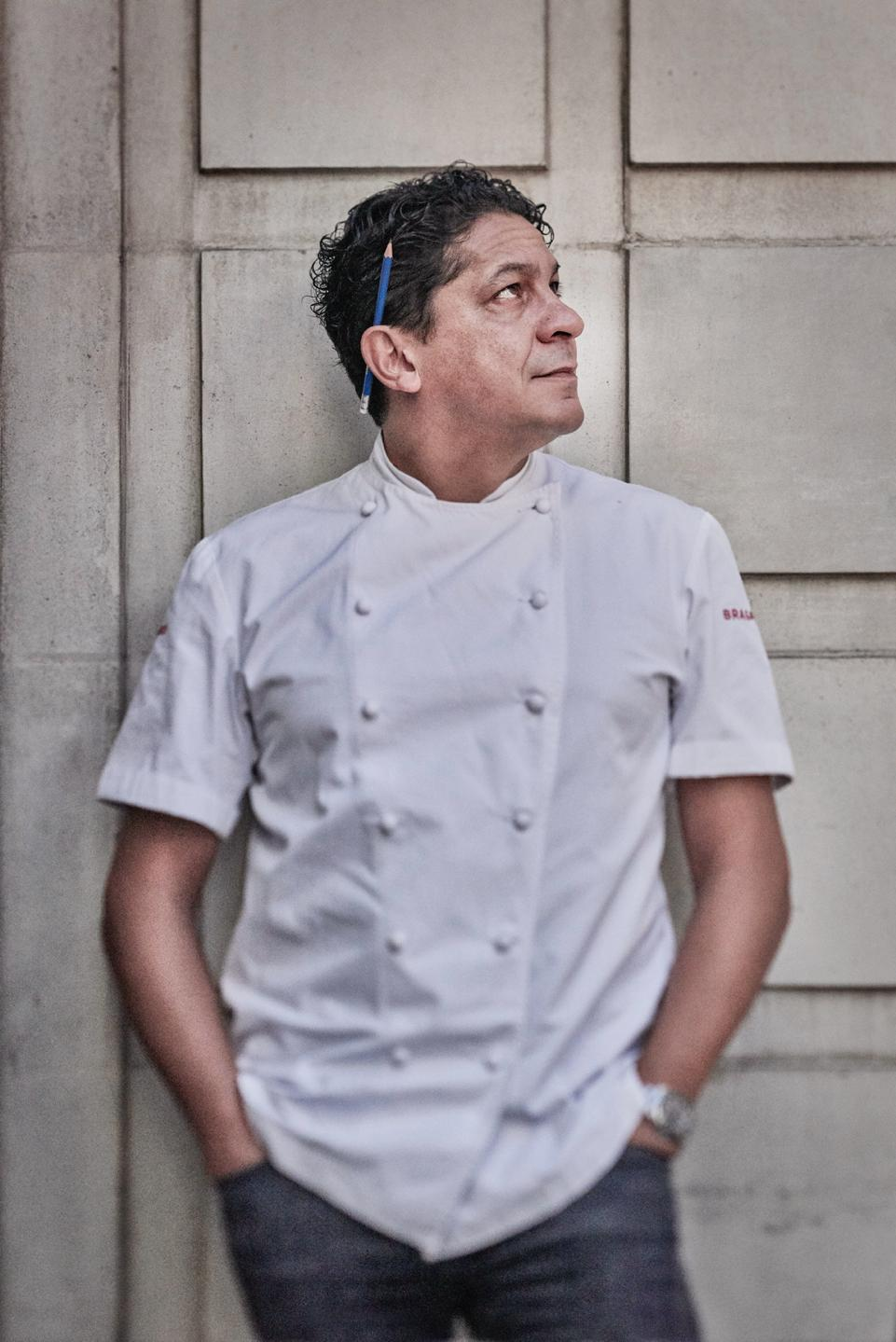
- Born: 1973 (age 52–53); Cerchiara di Calabria, Italy
- Occupation: Chef
- Awards: Order of Merit of the Italian Republic
- Website: www.cheffrancescomazzei.com

Francesco Mazzei (born 1973) is a world-renowned Italian chef, best known for championing the cuisine of Southern Italy in the United Kingdom and beyond. He is considered as one of the leading Italian chefs in the United Kingdom.

== Early life ==
Mazzei was born in 1973 in Cerchiara di Calabria, in the province of Cosenza. His family produced their own olive oil, bread and cured meats, and from the age of nine he spent his summers working in his uncle's gelateria.

== Career ==
=== Early career ===
Mazzei worked at the Grand Hotel in Rome before moving to London in the mid-1990s, where he spent around three and a half years at The Dorchester under chefs Willi Elsener and Henry Brosi. He then returned to Rome as sous chef at the Michelin-starred La Terrazza dell'Eden.

Back in London he worked as a sous chef at Cantina del Ponte, for the Santini group, for which he also opened restaurants in Edinburgh and Milan, and with restaurateur Alan Yau at Hakkasan and Yauatcha. He also opened the Royal Sporting Club in Bangkok. He later cooked at Franco's on Jermyn Street and in 2006 was chosen by Chris Corbin and Jeremy King as head chef of St Alban on Lower Regent Street, which opened in 2007.

=== L'Anima (2008–2015) ===
In 2008 Mazzei opened L'Anima near Liverpool Street in the City of London as chef-patron. Its dining room was designed by Claudio Silvestrin. In a 2008 review, Jay Rayner called it the City's "latest – and best – restaurant", and a 2009 profile in The Daily Telegraph credited Mazzei with putting southern Italian food on the map; in it he credited his mother with his love of cooking. In 2014 the restaurant hosted the final of Celebrity MasterChef. He left L'Anima in March 2015, after seven years. The restaurant closed in March 2018.

In 2010, while at L'Anima, Mazzei created a range of Calabrian-inspired dishes for the PizzaExpress chain, including the spicy Calabrese pizza. He has said the partnership led the chain to source its salami from Calabria.

=== D&D London (2015–2023) ===
In 2015 Mazzei joined D&D London as chef-patron of Sartoria on Savile Row, which reopened under him later that year after a refurbishment. Its menu drew on his southern Italian roots and family recipes. In April 2017 he opened Radici (Italian for "roots"), a southern Italian trattoria on the former site of D&D's Almeida restaurant in Islington, where he had lived for more than 20 years. In November 2017 he opened Fiume at Battersea Power Station, with his long-time colleague and fellow Calabrian Francesco Chiarelli as head chef. Speaking at the time, he said London restaurants were struggling to recruit European staff because of the city's high living costs and uncertainty after the Brexit vote.

In 2022 Mazzei appeared at Sartoria in the London episode of the CNN series Stanley Tucci: Searching for Italy, cooking Scottish scallops with 'nduja for Tucci. The two are long-standing friends, and Mazzei cooked at Tucci's wedding.

During the first COVID-19 lockdown in 2020, Mazzei and his team cooked meals for NHS staff at Barts Health NHS Trust hospitals, working with the HEROES charity.

Mazzei left D&D London in April 2023 after seven years; Sartoria and Fiume continued under the group.

=== Malta ===
In June 2023 Mazzei began a residency at Villa Corinthia, the restaurant of the Corinthia Palace hotel in Attard, Malta. Planned to run until December 2023, it was extended into 2024 and has continued alongside his London work.

=== Highgrove dinner ===
On 7 February 2025 King Charles III and Queen Camilla hosted a black-tie dinner at Highgrove House celebrating Italian food and the Slow Food movement, ahead of their state visit to Italy that April. Mazzei created the menu, inspired by the actor Stanley Tucci, using British produce with Italian olive oil the only import. Dishes included Scottish crab panzanella and ravioli with Westcombe ricotta and Highgrove herbs. It was the first time Mazzei had cooked for the King.

=== Mezzogiorno ===
In September 2024 Corinthia London announced that Mazzei would open a restaurant in the hotel's former Northall dining room. Mezzogiorno by Francesco Mazzei opened on 20 November 2025, with Mazzei as chef-patron and Chiarelli as head chef. The name, meaning both "midday" and southern Italy, is shared with his cookbook. The restaurant was added to the Michelin Guide in January 2026 and was awarded two AA Rosettes in February 2026. It won Best Fine Dining at the 2026 Italian Awards. Reviewing it for the Financial Times in February 2026, Jay Rayner described Mazzei as "quite simply the best" of the Italian chefs working in London and praised the "earthy, jagged edges" of his cooking.

=== Other work ===
Mazzei has advised the regional government of Calabria on promoting the region's artisan produce outside Italy. In 2023 he created a pizza, the No. 10, for the Franco Manca chain. He has also written and been interviewed about the food of his native Calabria for publications including the Financial Times and Foodism.

== Charity work ==
Mazzei is listed as an ambassador of Leukaemia UK, and in 2016 cooked at Who's Cooking Dinner?, an annual fundraising dinner for the leukaemia charity Leuka. In 2017 he supported The Felix Project, a London charity that redistributes surplus food, including through a lunch menu at Sartoria. He has also supported the Associazione Bambino Gesù del Cairo, which runs the Oasi della Pietà children's home in Cairo. In 2025 he taught a masterclass for the Felix Project's first cohort of chef apprentices.

== Awards and recognition ==
In July 2019 Mazzei was appointed a Knight (Cavaliere) of the Order of Merit of the Italian Republic.

== Bibliography ==
- Mezzogiorno: Francesco Mazzei Recipes from Southern Italy (Penguin Random House, 2015)

== Television ==
- Saturday Kitchen (BBC), a frequent guest since 2007
- MasterChef
- The Wine Show (2016)
- Hell's Kitchen Italia (Sky Uno, 2015), guest chef
- James Martin's Saturday Morning
- Cooking with the Stars
- Stanley Tucci: Searching for Italy (CNN, 2022)

== Personal life ==
Mazzei lives in Islington, north London, with his family.
