= The Great British Bake Off series 15 =

Fifteenth series of The Great British Bake Off

The Great British Bake Off
- Series 15
- Presented by: Noel Fielding; Alison Hammond
- Judges: Paul Hollywood; Prue Leith
- No. of contestants: 12
- Winner: Georgie Grasso
- Runners-up: Christiaan de Vries; Dylan Bachelet
- Location: Welford Park, near Newbury, Berkshire
- No. of max. bakes: 30
- No. of episodes: 10

Release
- Original network: Channel 4
- Original release: 24 September – 26 November 2024

Series chronology
- ← Previous; Series 14 Next → Series 16

The fifteenth series of The Great British Bake Off began on 24 September 2024. Alison Hammond and Noel Fielding returned as hosts, with Paul Hollywood and Prue Leith returning to judge the series. The bakers competing in the series were announced on 17 September 2024.

The series was won by Georgie Grasso, with Dylan Bachelet and Christiaan de Vries finishing as the runners-up.

== Bakers ==
Contestant	Age	Hometown	Occupation	Finish	Place
Jeff Thomas	67	West Yorkshire, England (Note: Originally from The Bronx)	Retired university lecturer	Episode 2	12th (quit)
Hazel Vaughan	71	Kent, England	Retired nail technician	Episode 2	11th
John Mincher	37	West Midlands, England	Directorate support manager	Episode 3	10th
Mike Wilkins	29	Wiltshire, England	Farm manager	Episode 4	9th
Andy Ryan	44	Romford, England	Car mechanic	Episode 5	8th
Nelly Ghaffar	44	Dorset, England (Note: Originally from Slovakia)	Palliative care assistant	Episode 6	7th
Sumayah Kazi	18	Lancashire, England	Gap Year student	Episode 7	6th
Illiyin Morrison	31	Norfolk, England	Birth trauma specialist midwife	Episode 8	5th
Gill Howard	53	Lancashire, England	Senior category manager	Episode 9	4th
Christiaan de Vries	33	London, England (Note: Originally from the Netherlands)	Menswear designer	Episode 10	Runner-up
Dylan Bachelet	20	Aylesbury, England	Retail assistant	Episode 10	Runner-up
Georgie Grasso	34	Carmarthen, Wales	Paediatric nurse	Episode 10	1st

== Results summary ==
Baker	Episodes									
Baker	1	2	3	4	5	6	7	8	9	10
Georgie	HIGH	LOW	HIGH	SB	SAFE	SAFE	HIGH	SB	LOW	WINNER
Christiaan	LOW	HIGH	SAFE	SAFE	SAFE	SAFE	SAFE	LOW	SB	RUNNER-UP
Dylan	SAFE	SAFE	SB	HIGH	SAFE	LOW	SB	HIGH	HIGH	RUNNER-UP
Gill	SAFE	SAFE	SAFE	SAFE	SB	HIGH	LOW	LOW	OUT	
Illiyin	SAFE	LOW^{[c]}	SAFE	SAFE	LOW	SAFE	LOW	OUT		
Sumayah	HIGH	SB	SAFE	LOW	HIGH	SB	OUT			
Nelly	SAFE	SAFE	HIGH	SAFE	SAFE	OUT				
Andy	SAFE	SAFE	LOW	SAFE	OUT					
Mike	SAFE	SAFE	SAFE	OUT						
John	SB	SAFE	OUT							
Hazel	LOW	OUT								
Jeff	N/A^{[a]}	WD^{[b]}								

^{[a]} Jeff was ill and unable to compete during the technical challenge and showstopper in episode 1. As a result, the judges decided that it was unfair to eliminate anyone in his absence.
^{[b]} Jeff left the show during the technical challenge in episode 2 after feeling unwell.
^{[c]} Illiyin's showstopper in episode 2 was evaluated without her, as she fainted at the end of the challenge and required medical attention.

Colour key:

Baker was one of the judges' least favourite bakers that week, but was not eliminated.
Baker was one of the judges' favourite bakers that week, but was not the Star Baker.
Baker got through to the next round.
Baker did not compete that week.
Baker withdrew from the show.
Baker was eliminated.
Baker was the Star Baker.
Baker was a series runner-up.
Baker was the series winner.

== Episodes ==
=== Episode 1: Cake ===
The first episode is Cake Week. For the first challenge, the bakers were given two hours to produce an elevated version of their signature loaf cake. For the technical challenge, set by Paul, the bakers were asked to bake a batch of eight perfectly symmetrical mini Battenberg cakes, consisting of a light sponge sandwiched in a silky buttercream, coated in apricot jam and wrapped in marzipan. The bakers were given five minutes to inspect and taste a mini Battenburg cake with no additional recipe, and were then given two hours and fifteen minutes to complete the challenge. For the showstopper challenge, the bakers were asked to make a hyper-realistic illusion cake in four hours.

Baker	Signature (Loaf Cake)	Technical/Taste And Bake (8 Mini Battenbergs)	Showstopper (Hyperrealistic Illusion Cake)	Result
Andy	'My First Bake' Loaf Cake	8th	'It's an Overnight Job' Illusion Cake	Safe
Christiaan	'Umami Apple' Loaf Cake	2nd	'Sweet Seams are Made With This' Illusion Cake	Safe
Dylan	'Sticky Rice' Loaf Cake	4th	'Canopic Jar' Illusion Cake	Safe
Georgie	Vanilla & Chocolate Marble Loaf Cake	1st	'Fanny the Chicken' Illusion Cake	Safe
Gill	'It's All V's Fault' Loaf Cake	6th	Crown Green Bowling Illusion Cake	Safe
Hazel	'Raspberry Surprise' Loaf Cake	10th	'Handbag' Illusion Cake	Safe
Illiyin	'Cinnamon Roll' Loaf Cake	7th	Vase Illusion Cake	Safe
Jeff	'Guiding Star' Loaf Cake	Did not compete	Did not compete	Safe
John	Cherry & Chocolate Marble Loaf Cake	3rd	'The Perfect Brunch' Illusion Cake	Star Baker
Mike	Lemon and Linseed Loaf Cake	11th	'My Favourite Cake & Books' Illusion Cake	Safe
Nelly	Coconut Loaf Cake	5th	'Retro 90's Shoes' Illusion Cake	Safe
Sumayah	'Halwa Surprise' Loaf Cake	9th	'Pato the Duck' Illusion Cake	Safe

=== Episode 2: Biscuits ===
The second episode is Biscuit Week. For the first challenge, the bakers were given two hours to produce twelve Viennese whirls sandwiched in any shape, flavour, and filling of their choice. For the technical challenge, set by Prue, the bakers were asked to bake in two hours a batch of twelve mint cream biscuits, consisting of a buttery biscuit topped with a smooth peppermint cream and coated in tempered dark chocolate. For the showstopper challenge, the bakers were asked to make a biscuit puppet theatre with edible biscuit puppets.

Baker	Signature (Viennese Whirls)	Technical (Mint Cream Biscuits)	Showstopper (Biscuit Puppet Theatre)	Result
Andy	'PB & J' Viennese Whirls	10th	'If Pigs Could Fly' Biscuit Puppet Theatre	Safe
Christiaan	Floral Viennese Whirls	6th	'Finding Home' Biscuit Puppet Theatre	Safe
Dylan	'Campfire Cookie' Viennese Whirls	11th	'Rabbit In The Moon' Biscuit Puppet Theatre	Safe
Georgie	Rhubarb & Custard Viennese Whirls	9th	‘Welsh Festival' Biscuit Puppet Theatre	Safe
Gill	'Two Desserts' Viennese Whirls	4th	'The Gingerbread Man' Biscuit Puppet Theatre	Safe
Hazel	Coffee Viennese Whirls	5th	'Punch & Judy' Biscuit Puppet Theatre	Eliminated
Illiyin	Pistachio & White Chocolate Viennese Whirls	8th	'Strawberry Fields Forever' Biscuit Puppet Theatre	Safe
Jeff	'What's The Matter? Are You Not Feeling Well?' Viennese Whirls	Withdrew		
John	Irish Cream & Coffee Viennese Whirls	2nd	'Welsh Adventures' Biscuit Puppet Theatre	Safe
Mike	Malted Brown Butter & Raspberry Viennese Whirls	1st	'Go Farming' Biscuit Puppet Theatre	Safe
Nelly	'My First Dog' Viennese Whirls	7th	'Forest Dance' Biscuit Puppet Theatre	Safe
Sumayah	Cheese & Blackberry Viennese Whirls	3rd	'Enchanted Garden' Biscuit Puppet Theatre	Star Baker

^2 Jeff withdrew from the show altogether after falling ill during the technical challenge.
^3 Illiyin fainted at the end of the showstopper challenge. Since she was still able to complete the round, the judges continued with evaluating her bake, deeming her a candidate for elimination alongside Georgie and Hazel.

=== Episode 3: Bread ===
The ten remaining bakers were asked to carry out three challenges. The Signature Challenge was to make twelve identical savoury buns which had to be from an enriched, yeast-based dough, but could be any flavour and any shape. The Technical Challenge let the bakers watch Paul Hollywood demonstrate the plaiting of seven strands of dough to form a wreath before they then had two and a half hours to repeat the exercise. The final Showstopper Challenge this week was to make a cornucopia, also called a 'horn of plenty', filled with at least two different types of bread.

Baker	Signature (Savoury Buns)	Technical (Plaited Loaf)	Showstopper (Bread Cornucopia Display)	Result
Andy	'Maisie's Mini Salami' Savoury Buns	3rd	'New York, Neeeeeeew Yoooork' Cornucopia	Safe
Christiaan	Mushroom and Sage Pesto Savoury Buns	8th	'Wildflower Delights' Cornucopia	Safe
Dylan	Gochujang & Garlic Savoury Buns	10th	'Cat' Cornucopia	Star Baker
Georgie	'Pesto Brunch' Savoury Buns	7th	'My Favourite Things' Cornucopia	Safe
Gill	Bury Black Pudding Savoury Buns	5th	'All Day Holiday' Cornucopia	Safe
Illiyin	Jamaican Brown Chicken Savoury Buns	4th	Bread Cornucopia	Safe
John	'Yamas!' Savoury Buns	9th	'Horn of Pride' Cornucopia	Eliminated
Mike	'Baaa-o' Savoury Buns	6th	'Zeus's Horn' Cornucopia	Safe
Nelly	'Ethnic Harmony' Savoury Buns	1st	Cornucopia	Safe
Sumayah	'Sunflower' Savoury Buns	2nd	'Friendship & Family' Cornucopia	Safe

=== Episode 4: Caramel ===
The nine remaining bakers tackled caramel this week throughout the three challenges. For the signature challenge, the bakers were asked to make 12 identical caramel biscuits. For the technical challenge, they were tasked with making a classic pear tarte tatin with a walnut praline ice cream. The bakers had three hours to complete the challenge. For the showstopper, the challenge was to make a caramel mousse cake with at least two types of caramel decorations in four and a half hours.

Baker	Signature (12 Caramel Biscuits)	Technical (Pear Tarte Tatin)	Showstopper (Caramel Mousse Cake)	Result
Andy	'A Bit Of A Fix' Caramel Biscuits	9th	'Lonely Tree' Mousse Cake	Safe
Christiaan	'Spiced Nut Stroopwafels' Caramel Biscuits	2nd	'Tropicaramel' Mousse Cake	Safe
Dylan	'Oats With Pineapple' Caramel Biscuits	5th	Lemon Honey & Ginger Mousse Cake	Safe
Georgie	'Favourite Chocolate Bar' Caramel Biscuits	1st	'Glass Rose Mirror' Mousse Cake	Star Baker
Gill	'Fruit and Nut Millionaire' Caramel Biscuits	8th	'Sticky Toffee' Mousse Cake	Safe
Illiyin	'Almond Florentine' Caramel Biscuits	4th	Caramel And White Chocolate Mousse Cake	Safe
Mike	'Dad's Favourite' Caramel Biscuits	7th	Coffee Popcorn Mousse Cake	Eliminated
Nelly	'Good Old Times' Caramel Biscuits	6th	'Behind Every Great Woman' Mousse Cake	Safe
Sumayah	Sesame Hibiscus Caramel Biscuits	3rd	'Banoffee Pecan' Mousse Cake	Safe

=== Episode 5: Pastry ===
The eight remaining bakers faced pastry based three challenges. For the signature challenge, the bakers were asked to make a dozen frangipane tarts in two hours. For the technical challenge, Paul Hollywood tasked them with making his version of a spanakopita with homemade filo pastry shaped in a spiral and gave them two and a half hours to complete the bake. For the showstopper, the bakers had to produce a Paris-Brest centerpiece with an edible stand in four hours.

Baker	Signature (12 Frangipane Tarts)	Technical (Spanakopita)	Showstopper (Paris-Brest)	Result
Andy	'Nan's Sweets' Frangipane Tarts	7th	'All You Need Is Love' Paris-Brest	Eliminated
Christiaan	Cashew & Black Sesame Frangipane Tarts	2nd	Orange & Pecan Paris-Brest	Safe
Dylan	Coffee and Dark Chocolate Frangipane Tarts	1st	'Contrasts of Tea' Paris-Brest	Safe
Georgie	'Almond Bakewell' Frangipane Tarts	6th	Pistachio and Raspberry Paris-Brest	Safe
Gill	Pistachio & Blueberry Frangipane Tarts	8th	Lemon & Thyme Paris-Brest	Star Baker
Illiyin	'Taste of the Tropics' Frangipane Tarts	5th	'Crown of Nuttiness' Paris-Brest	Safe
Nelly	'Iceberg' Frangipane Tarts	3rd	Pistachio Paris-Brest	Safe
Sumayah	Raspberry & Coconut Frangipane Tarts	4th	'Tree of Life' Paris-Brest	Safe

=== Episode 6: Autumn ===
The seven remaining bakers faced three challenges themed around autumn. For the signature, they had 2 hours and 45 minutes to make a decorative pie with autumnal flavours. The technical recipe was Prue Leith's vegan adaptation of a traditional parkin; the bakers had an hour and a half to complete the challenge. The showstopper required them to produce elaborate vegetable cakes themed around an autumn festival.

Baker	Signature (Autumnal Pie)	Technical (Vegan Parkin)	Showstopper (Autumnal Festival Cake)	Result
Christiaan	'Forest Cano-Pie'	6th	'Roots of Samhain' Cake	Safe
Dylan	Autumnal Apple Pie	4th	Diwali Cake	Safe
Georgie	Pumpkin & Pecan Pie	2nd	'Tree Trunk Scene' Cake	Safe
Gill	Blackberry & Apple 'Windy Day' Pie	7th	Bonfire 'Parrot' Cake	Safe
Illiyin	Autumnal Fruit Pie	1st	'Day of the Dead' Cake	Safe
Nelly	‘Out in Nature’ Pie	5th	'Woman in Autumn' Cake	Eliminated
Sumayah	Butternut & Pecan Pie	3rd	'Autumn Leaves' Harvest Cake	Star Baker

=== Episode 7: Desserts ===
The six remaining bakers were tested on their dessert-making skills. The signature challenge was for eight mini meringue nests with two fillings, to be completed in two and a quarter hours. For the technical, Prue Leith tasked the contestants with making a traditional English pudding: the spotted dick. The showstopper asked the bakers to put their own spin on a classic Italian tiramisu, giving them four and a half hours to complete this challenge.

Baker	Signature (8 meringue Nests)	Technical (Spotted Dick)	Showstopper (Tiramisu)	Result
Christiaan	'Smell The Roses' Meringue Nests	3rd	'Memphis Milano' Tiramisu	Safe
Dylan	'Coconut Illusion' Meringue Nests	1st	'Concrete Box' Tiramisu	Star Baker
Georgie	'Aunty Meryl's' Plum Meringue Nests	2nd	'Old Italian' Tiramisu	Safe
Gill	'Just Peachy' Meringue Nests	4th	'Coconut Latte Charlotte Russe' Tiramisu	Safe
Illiyin	Piña Colada Meringue Nests	5th	'Jewelry Box' Tiramisu	Safe
Sumayah	'Pomegranate & Plenty More' Meringue Nests	6th	'Batik Mousse Cake' Tiramisu	Eliminated

=== Episode 8: The '70s (Quarterfinals) ===
In the quarterfinal, the five remaining bakers were given three retro challenges, taking them back to the 1970s. The signature required them to create a decorative stack of at least 30 profiteroles. The technical was Paul Hollywood's banoffee pie. Although the bakers were given ingredient measures, they did not have any instructions for how to make the pie. The showstopper challenge was to make a '70s-style tiered gateau.

Baker	Signature (Profiterole Stack)	Technical (Banoffee Pie)	Showstopper ('70s Gateau)	Result
Christiaan	'I Got Choux Babe' Profiterole Stack	2nd	Lemon, Hazelnut and Advocaat '70s Gâteau	Safe
Dylan	'Sci-Fi' Profiterole Stack	3rd	Mint Chocolate '70s Gâteau	Safe
Georgie	'Tribute to Freddie' Profiterole Stack	1st	Vintage Black Forest '70s Gâteau	Star Baker
Gill	'70s Christmas Tree' Profiterole Stack	5th	'Geoff's Cafe' '70s Gâteau	Safe
Illiyin	'Ode to the '70s Afro' Profiterole Stack	4th	'Peach Melba' '70s Gâteau	Eliminated

=== Episode 9: Patisserie (Semifinal) ===
Baker	Signature (Breakfast Pastries)	Technical (Opera cake)	Showstopper (Fruit-Shaped Entremets)	Result
Christiaan	Rhubarb and Saffron Danish & Za'atar and Gruyère Swirls	3rd	'Sorrento Citrus' Entremets	Star Baker
Dylan	Hazelnut & Cinnamon Croissants	1st	Avocado and Orange Entremets	Safe
Georgie	Coffee and Hazelnut Pinwheels & Chocolate Pain Suisse	4th	'Market Box Fruits' Entremets	Safe
Gill	'Pain Au Sausage Sandwich' and Banana & Custard Pastries	2nd	'Pick Your Own Car Keys' Entremets	Eliminated

=== Episode 10: Final ===
Baker	Signature (Scones)	Technical (Afternoon Tea Display)	Showstopper (Hanging Cake)	Result
Christiaan	Curry & Coconut Scones	1st	'Sculpted Summer' Hanging Cake	Runner-up
Dylan	Strawberry & Salmon Scones	3rd	'Colours of Murano' Hanging Cake	Runner-up
Georgie	'Afternoon Tea' Scones	2nd	'Summer Garden Celebration' Hanging Cake	Winner

== Specials ==
Two specials were commissioned for the festive season:

=== The Great Christmas Bake Off ===
The Great Christmas Bake Off featured five soap opera stars: Chris Bisson from Emmerdale, Natalie Cassidy and Dean Gaffney from EastEnders, Shobna Gulati from Coronation Street, and Sheree Murphy from Emmerdale and Hollyoaks.

Baker	Signature (Yule Log)	Technical (Mini Meringue Christmas Trees)	Showstopper (Biscuit Soap Scene)	Result
Chris	Spiced Ginger & Soursop Yule Log	2nd	'Carol Singing At The Woolpack' Biscuit Soap Scene	Winner
Dean	Irish Cream & Raspberry Yule Log	3rd	'When Wellard Stole The Turkey' Biscuit Soap Scene	Runner-up
Natalie	Mincemeat & Brandy Yule Log	4th	'Ghosts of Christmas Past' Biscuit Soap Scene	Runner-up
Sheree	'Festive Tiramisu' Yule Log	1st	'Tricia's Demise' Biscuit Soap Scene	Runner-up
Shobna	'Black Forest' Yule Log	5th	'Fire in the Corner Shop' Biscuit Soap Scene	Runner-up

=== The Great New Year Bake Off ===
The Great New Year Bake Off featured six Scottish bakers from past series: Lea Harris from Series 1, Series 3 runner-up James Morton, Norman Calder from Series 5, Series 11 winner Peter Sawkins, Kevin Flynn from Series 13, and Nicky Laceby from Series 14.

Baker	Signature (Black Bun)	Technical (Shortbread Snowflake)	Showstopper (Cranachan Based Dessert)	Result
James	'Rabbie Burns' Black Bun	1st	Cranachan Croquembouche	Runner-up
Kevin	Tartan Black Bun	6th	Cranachan 'Cake or Meringue?'	Runner-up
Lea	'Coo Pie' Black Bun	4th	'In Bed Before The Bells' Cranachan Mousse Cake	Runner-up
Nicky	'Angus The Highland Cow' Black Bun	3rd	'This is no Cranachan Pie' Dessert Tower	Runner-up
Norman	'Mum's Special' Black Bun with Macaroons	5th	'Cranapav Palova Tower'	Runner-up
Peter	'Scottish Thistle' Black Bun	2nd	'Cranachan Croquembouche'	Winner

== Ratings ==
The first episode of the 15th series was watched by 3.6 million viewers according to overnight figures, down from the 4.3 million of 2023.

Episode no.	Airdate	7-day viewers (millions)	Channel 4 weekly ranking	Weekly ranking all channels
1	24 September 2024	7.72	1	2
2	1 October 2024	7.47	1	3
3	8 October 2024	7.48	1	2
4	15 October 2024	7.37	1	3
5	22 October 2024	7.22	1	3
6	29 October 2024	7.19	1	4
7	5 November 2024	7.35	1	3
8	12 November 2024	7.38	1	4
9	19 November 2024	7.12	1	10
10	26 November 2024	7.70	1	10
