= Pantxineta =

Traditional Basque Country dessert

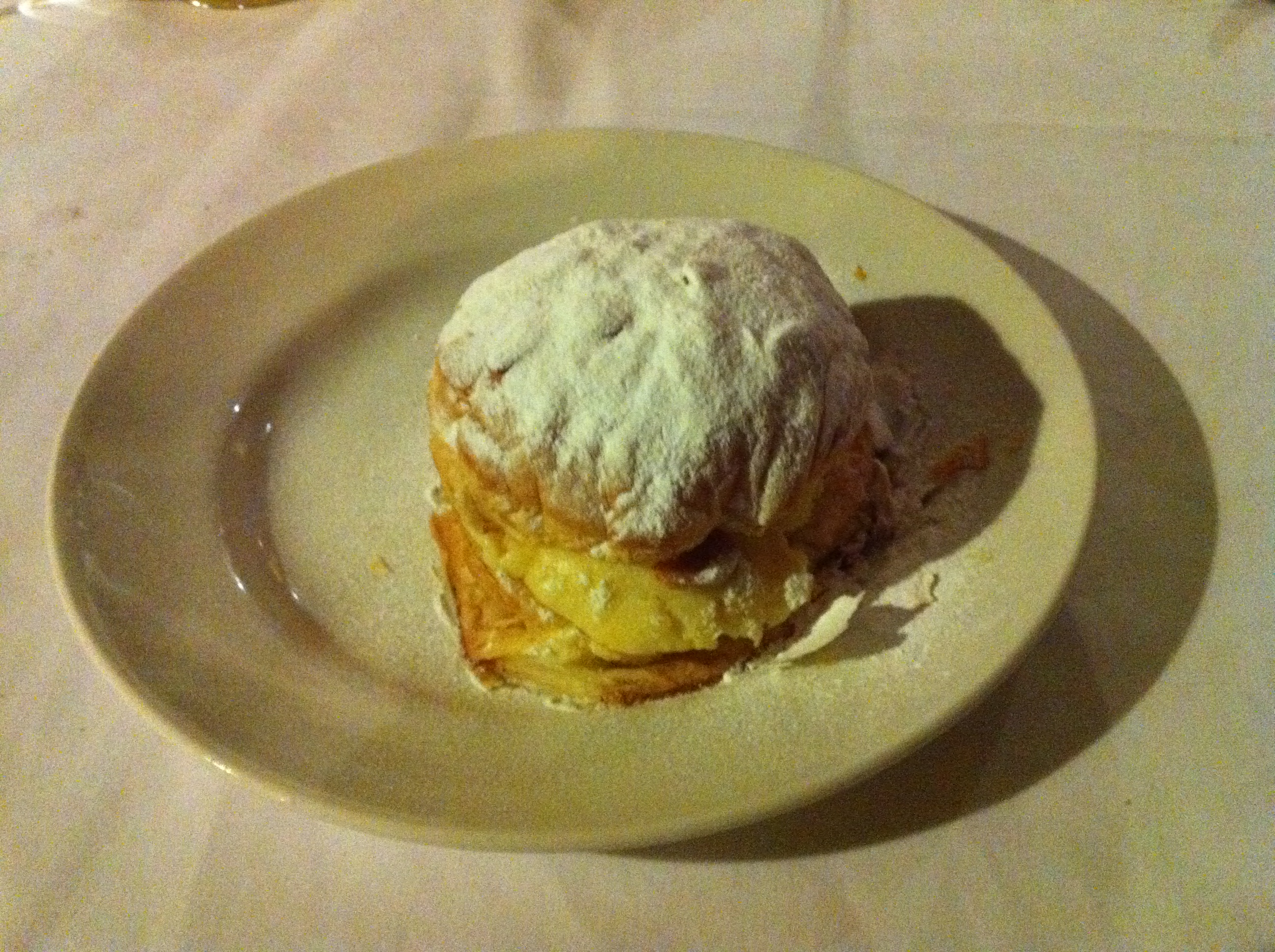
Pantxineta

The pantxineta is a typical dessert of the Basque Country. It consists of a bun of puff-pastry filled with thick custard cream; it is topped with almonds and often decorated with icing sugar.

== History ==
The Dictionary of Basque gastronomy defines the "pantxineta" as a tart of puff-pastry and custard cream created at the beginning of the 20th century in San Sebastián by the House of Otaegui, a local patisserie, ca. 1915. Back then, San Sebastian was a summer vacation resort for the Spanish royalty, aristocrats and bourgeoisie; patisseries and restaurants thrived, usually serving food and dishes heavily influenced by the cuisine of nearby France. Apparently, the pantxineta was devised in an attempt to imitate traditional French frangipane tarts; however, instead of employing the usual almond-based frangipane filling, a baker at Otaegui used a thick custard, and covered the tart with an outer layer of puff-pastry. They initially called the desert a "frantxi-pan", which in the local basque dialect quickly evolved into "pantxineta".

== Characteristics ==
Since its inception, the desert has grown in popularity due to its simplicity and tastiness, and it is nowadays considered one of the cornerstone desserts of Basque cuisine. It is usually served warm, either reheated or, whenever possible, straight out of the baking oven. Sometimes it is served along hot chocolate syrup, which is poured on top of the pastry.

== Ingredients ==
The principal ingredients of the pantxineta are milk, butter, sugar, eggs, flour, almonds and hazelnuts.

== See also ==
- List of desserts
