= The Great British Bake Off series 16 =

Sixteenth series of The Great British Bake Off

The Great British Bake Off
- Series 16
- Presented by: Noel Fielding; Alison Hammond
- Judges: Paul Hollywood; Prue Leith
- No. of contestants: 12
- Winner: Jasmine Mitchell
- Runners-up: Tom Arden; Aaron Mountford-Myles
- Location: Welford Park, near Newbury, Berkshire
- No. of episodes: 10

Release
- Original network: Channel 4
- Original release: 2 September – 4 November 2025

Series chronology
- ← Previous; Series 15 Next → Series 17

The sixteenth series of The Great British Bake Off began on 2 September 2025, again presented by Alison Hammond and Noel Fielding and judged by Paul Hollywood and Prue Leith. The bakers competing in the series were announced on 19 August 2025. This series is the last to feature Prue Leith.

The series was won by Jasmine Mitchell, with Tom Arden and Aaron Mountford-Myles finishing as the runners-up.

== Bakers ==
Baker	Age	Hometown	Occupation	Finish	Place
Hassan Islam	30	Rotherham, England	Analytical research & development scientist	Episode 1	12th
Leighton Morgan	59	Surrey, England	Software delivery manager	Episode 2	11th
Carol 'Pui Man' Li (Note: Originally from Hong Kong)	51	Essex, England	Bridal designer	Episode 3	10th
Jessika Trassel	32	London, England	Service designer	Episode 4	9th
Nadia Mercuri	41	Liverpool, England	Hairdresser	Episode 5	8th
Nataliia Richardson (Note: Originally from Ukraine)	32	East Yorkshire, England	Office assistant	Episode 6	7th
Lesley Holloway	59	Kent, England	Hairdresser	Episode 7	6th
Iain Ross	29	Belfast, Northern Ireland	Software engineer	Episode 8	5th
Toby Littlewood	29	Warwickshire, England	Business development executive	Episode 9	4th
Aaron Mountford-Myles	38	Stoke-on-Trent, England	Senior systems architect	Episode 10	Runner-up
Thomas "Tom" Arden	31	London, England	Creative entrepreneur	Episode 10	Runner-up
Jasmine Mitchell	23	London, England	Medical student	Episode 10	1st

== Results summary ==
Baker	Episodes									
Baker	1	2	3	4	5	6	7	8	9	10
Jasmine	SAFE	HIGH	SB	SB	HIGH	SB	HIGH	SB	SB	WINNER
Aaron	SAFE	LOW	SAFE	SAFE	SB	LOW	SAFE	HIGH	LOW^{[a]}	RUNNER-UP
Tom	HIGH	SB	HIGH	HIGH	HIGH	SAFE	SAFE	LOW	LOW^{[a]}	RUNNER-UP
Toby	LOW	LOW	SAFE	HIGH	LOW	SAFE	SB	SAFE	OUT^{[a]}	
Iain	SAFE	SAFE	LOW	LOW	SAFE	SAFE	LOW	OUT		
Lesley	SAFE	SAFE	SAFE	SAFE	SAFE	HIGH	OUT			
Nataliia	SB	SAFE	LOW	SAFE	SAFE	OUT				
Nadia	SAFE	SAFE	HIGH	SAFE	OUT					
Jessika	HIGH	SAFE	SAFE	OUT						
Pui Man	SAFE	LOW	OUT							
Leighton	LOW	OUT								
Hassan	OUT									

^{[a]} With the exception of Jasmine, none of the bakers could be considered for Star Baker due to missteps in the showstopper round and were all considered for elimination.

Colour key:

Baker was one of the judges' least favourite bakers that week, but was not eliminated.
Baker was one of the judges' favourite bakers that week, but was not the Star Baker.
Baker got through to the next round.
Baker was eliminated.
Baker was the Star Baker.
Baker was a series runner-up.
Baker was the series winner.

== Episodes ==
=== Episode 1: Cake ===
The first episode is Cake Week. For the first challenge, the bakers were given two hours to produce a decorative Swiss roll. For the technical challenge, set by Paul, the bakers were asked to create nine Fondant Fancies. The bakers were given five minutes to inspect and taste a mini Fondant Fancy cake with no additional recipe, and were then given two and a quarter hours to complete the challenge. For the showstopper challenge, the bakers were asked to make a landscape cake in four hours.

Baker	Signature (Swiss Roll)	Technical/Taste and Bake (9 Fondant Fancies)	Showstopper (Landscape Cake)	Result
Aaron	'Pure (But No) Honey' Swiss Roll	4th	'Pastel Paradiso' Landscape Cake	Safe
Hassan	Chocolate, Coffee & Caramel Swiss Roll	10th	'Japanese Bamboo Forest' Landscape Cake	Eliminated
Iain	'Fift-Queen's University' Swiss Roll	8th	'It's All Downhill From Here' Landscape Cake	Safe
Jasmine	Lemon & Raspberry Swiss Roll	9th	'Scottish Highland' Landscape Cake	Safe
Jessika	Coconut & Grapefruit Swiss Roll	2nd	'Birthday Morning' Landscape Cake	Safe
Leighton	'Amalfi Coast Lemon Glade' Swiss Roll	6th	'The Green, Green Grass of Home' Landscape Cake	Safe
Lesley	'Lemons & Daisies' Swiss Roll	5th	'Dad's Bob Ross' Landscape Cake	Safe
Nadia	'Cherry Amour' Swiss Roll	7th	'My Island Dream' Landscape Cake	Safe
Nataliia	'Ukrainian Passion Petal' Swiss Roll	3rd	'Ukraine' Landscape Cake	Star Baker
Pui Man	Lemon & Matcha Swiss Roll	11th	'Hong Kong Lion Rock' Landscape Cake	Safe
Toby	Rhubarb & Custard Swiss Roll	1st	'PB and J-acob's Ladder' Landscape Cake	Safe
Tom	'Tartan' Swiss Roll	12th	'Icelandic' Landscape Cake	Safe

=== Episode 2: Biscuits ===
The second episode is Biscuit Week. For the first challenge, the bakers were given two hours to produce twelve Slice and Bake biscuits. For the technical challenge, set by Prue, the bakers were asked to bake in two hours a batch of Chocolate Hobnob biscuits, topped with a thin layer of caramel and contain two different feathered chocolate designs. For the showstopper challenge, the bakers were asked to make a biscuit time capsule filled with five edible mementos in four hours.

Baker	Signature (12 Slice & Bake Biscuits)	Technical (Chocolate Hobnobs)	Showstopper (Biscuit Time Capsule)	Result
Aaron	'Mini Winnies' Slice & Bake Biscuits	8th	'Sugar in Spring' Biscuit Time Capsule	Safe
Iain	'Mince Pie Cat-astrophe' Slice & Bake Biscuits	5th	'If I Could Turn-table Back Time' Biscuit Time Capsule	Safe
Jasmine	'Sail Around the World' Slice & Bake Biscuits	4th	'Our Favourite Scottish Summers' Biscuit Time Capsule	Safe
Jessika	'Egg-cellent Brunch' Slice & Bake Biscuits	7th	'Trails and Tales' Biscuit Time Capsule	Safe
Leighton	'Orange Slices of Delight' Slice & Bake Biscuits	10th	'Piano Memories' Biscuit Time Capsule	Eliminated
Lesley	'Cupcake' Slice & Bake Biscuits	9th	'Happy Memories' Biscuit Time Capsule	Safe
Nadia	'Amma's Avos' Slice & Bake Biscuits	2nd	'Picnic Basket' Biscuit Time Capsule	Safe
Nataliia	'Yorkshire Welcome' Slice & Bake Biscuits	3rd	'A Slice of Life' Biscuit Time Capsule	Safe
Pui Man	'Year of the Ox' Slice & Bake Biscuits	11th	'Jumbo Boat' Biscuit Time Capsule	Safe
Toby	'Bex's Breakfast' Slice & Bake Biscuits	1st	'Treasure Chest' Biscuit Time Capsule	Safe
Tom	'Hagia Sophia' Slice & Bake Biscuits	6th	'Granny's Cottage' Biscuit Time Capsule	Star Baker

=== Episode 3: Bread ===
The third episode is Bread Week. For the first challenge, the bakers were given two hours to produce a savoury Monkey bread. For the technical challenge, set by Paul, the bakers were asked to bake in two hours a dozen glazed doughnuts, six of which containing a strawberry glazing. For the showstopper challenge, the bakers were given five hours to make their own celebratory tiered Sweet Bread.

Baker	Signature (Savoury Monkey Bread)	Technical (12 Glazed Ring Doughnuts)	Showstopper (Celebratory Tiered Sweet Bread)	Result
Aaron	'Not For Everyone' Monkey Bread	3rd	'Flowers in Paradise' Sweet Bread	Safe
Iain	'Irish Cheese Board' Monkey Bread	6th	'It's A Samhain-derful Time of the Year' Sweet Bread	Safe
Jasmine	'Mediterranean Mezze' Monkey Bread	1st	'Midsummer Flower Crown' Sweet Bread	Star Baker
Jessika	'Picnic Season' Monkey Bread	7th	'Rain, Dance, Celebration' Sweet Bread	Safe
Lesley	'Family Favourite' Monkey Bread	9th	'Korovai' Sweet Bread	Safe
Nadia	Italian Monkey Bread	2nd	'Gâteaux de Mariage de Rêve' Sweet Bread	Safe
Nataliia	'Family Table' Monkey Bread	8th	'Three Generations Korovai' Sweet Bread	Safe
Pui Man	'Festival Basin' Monkey Bread	10th	'Coconut Cocktail Wedding' Sweet Bread	Eliminated
Toby	'Tre Scimmie (Three Monkeys)' Monkey Bread	4th	'The Bread That Stolle Christmas' Sweet Bread	Safe
Tom	'French Dègustation' Monkey Bread	5th	'Cinnamon Tower' Sweet Bread	Safe

=== Episode 4: Back To School ===
The fourth episode is Back To School Week. For the first challenge, the bakers were given two hours to produce 12 flapjacks. For the technical challenge, set by Prue, the bakers were asked to bake in two hours a batch of school cake, made with vanilla sponge, white glacé icing, and covered in sprinkles, with a jug of custard to go with it. For the showstopper challenge, the bakers were given four and a half hours to make their own Summer Fête School Display containing one large bake, and two batches of twelve small bakes.

Baker	Signature (12 Flapjacks)	Technical (16 School Cakes)	Showstopper (Summer Fête School Display)	Result
Aaron	'Lat Snacks' Flapjacks	2nd	'Four Hour Relay: Bake Edition' Summer Fête Stall	Safe
Iain	'Banana Jacks' Flapjacks	3rd	'The Auld' Summer Fête Stall	Safe
Jasmine	Raspberry, Chocolate and Hazelnut Flapjacks	1st	'My Favourite Games' Summer Fête Stall	Star Baker
Jessika	'Red Wine Rendezvous' Flapjacks	7th	'Prehistoric Pantry' Summer Fête Stall	Eliminated
Lesley	'Dan's Cherry Bakewell' Flapjacks	5th	'Happy Memories of the 70's' Summer Fête Stall	Safe
Nadia	Cherry and Coconut Flapjacks	9th	'Traditional Bake Sale' Summer Fête Stall	Safe
Nataliia	'First Day' Flapjacks	8th	'Rucksack Memories' Summer Fête Stall	Safe
Toby	'Carrot Patch' Flapjacks	4th	'Schooldays' Summer Fête Stall	Safe
Tom	Apple Crumble Flapjacks	6th	'Cocknowle' Summer Fête Stall	Safe

=== Episode 5: Chocolate ===
The fifth episode is Chocolate Week. For the first challenge, the bakers were given two and a half hours to produce some highly decorated chocolate mousse cups. For the technical challenge, set by Paul, the bakers were asked to bake in two and a half hours a white chocolate tart, featuring a buttery shortcrust pastry, and a silky smooth set white chocolate ganache, all while selecting their own ingredients with no recipe. For the showstopper challenge, the bakers were given four and a half hours to make their own Chocolate Fondue Display, including a highly decorated chocolate centrepiece with an edible dipping pot to hold their chocolate sauce.

Baker	Signature (6 Chocolate Mousse Cups)	Technical (White Chocolate Tart)	Showstopper (Chocolate Fondue Display)	Result
Aaron	'Caramel Tiramoussiato' Mousse Cups	3rd	'Pianola Grande' Chocolate Fondue	Star Baker
Iain	'Kriek Craic' Mousse Cups	7th	'Glenariff Park' Chocolate Fondue	Safe
Jasmine	Chocolate Praline Mousse Cups	2nd	'Chocolate Tree' Chocolate Fondue	Safe
Lesley	'Tiramisu' Mousse Cups	1st	'Death by Chocolate' Chocolate Fondue	Safe
Nadia	'Summer Strawberry' Delight Mousse Cups	8th	'Ladies Day' Chocolate Fondue	Eliminated
Nataliia	'Granny's Garden' Mousse Cups	6th	'Last Day of Pompeii' Chocolate Fondue	Safe
Toby	Chocolate Orange Mousse Cups	5th	'Campsite Delight' Chocolate Fondue	Safe
Tom	'Tiramousoooo' Chocolate Mousse Cups	4th	'Ocean Scene' Chocolate Fondue	Safe

=== Episode 6: Pastry ===
The sixth episode is Pastry Week. For the signature challenge, the bakers were given two and a half hours to produce a savoury pastry plait with a savoury filling. For the technical challenge, set by Paul, the bakers were asked to bake in two and a half hours a gala pie with piccalilli. For the showstopper challenge, the bakers were given four hours to make their own visually stunning sculpted tart.

Baker	Signature (Savoury Plait)	Technical (Gala Pie)	Showstopper (Sculpted Tart)	Result
Aaron	'Jamaican Beef Patty' Savoury Plait	7th	'No One Gnomes' Sculpted Tart	Safe
Iain	'Irish Stew-sage Roll' Savoury Plait	2nd	'Giant's Causeway' Sculpted Tart	Safe
Jasmine	'Aunt Pom's Sausage Roll' Savoury Plait	1st	'The Orchard' Sculpted Tart	Star Baker
Lesley	'Dad's Favourite' Savoury Plait	3rd	'Mabel's Bumblebee' Sculpted Tart	Safe
Nataliia	'Kyiv in a Crust' Savoury Plait	5th	Swan Sculpted Tart	Eliminated
Toby	'Sivell Place' Savoury Plait	4th	'Rollercoast-tart' Sculpted Tart	Safe
Tom	'Hong Kong Sausage Roll' Savoury Plait	6th	'Risalamande' Sculpted Tart	Safe

=== Episode 7: Meringue ===
The seventh episode is Meringue Week. For the signature challenge, the bakers were given two hours to produce 12 Mini Meringue Pies with a Meringue topping. For the technical challenge, set by Paul, the bakers were asked to bake some perfectly risen raspberry soufflé's in a staggered start and finish time. For the showstopper challenge, the bakers were given four and a half hours to make their own beautifully decorated "Vacherin Glacé" with a Meringue shell and ice cream.

Baker	Signature (12 Mini Meringue Pies)	Technical (4 Soufflés)	Showstopper (Vacherin Glacé)	Result
Aaron	'Almost Mont Blanc' Meringue Pies	2nd	'Kitsune Sundae' Vacherin Glacé	Safe
Iain	'Lucky Rhubarb' Meringue Pies	1st	'Bingate Redemption' Vacherin Glacé	Safe
Jasmine	Raspberry & Passion Fruit Meringue Pies	4th	'Scallop Shell' Vacherin Glacé	Safe
Lesley	Lemon & Raspberry Meringue Pies	6th	'Wedding Cake' Vacherin Glacé	Eliminated
Toby	'Apple Lattice' Meringue Pies	3rd	'Mango Tree' Vacherin Glacé	Star Baker
Tom	Rhubarb & Strawberry Meringue Pies	5th	'Family Forage' Vacherin Glacé	Safe

=== Episode 8: Desserts (Quarterfinals) ===
The eighth episode is Desserts Week. For the signature challenge, the bakers were asked to produce a Basque cheesecake. For the technical challenge, set by Prue, the bakers were asked to bake six orange and cardamom steamed puddings drizzled with golden syrup and served with crème anglaise. For the showstopper challenge, the bakers were given four and a half hours to make a celebratory free-standing trifle.

Baker	Signature (Basque Style Cheesecake)	Technical (6 Gluten-Free Orange Upside Down Puddings)	Showstopper (Celebratory Free-Standing Trifle)	Result
Aaron	'Basque in Sake' Cheesecake	5th	'Trifle Haters' Trifle	Safe
Iain	'Christmas Box' Basque Cheesecake	2nd	'Triflemina' Trifle	Eliminated
Jasmine	Mango and Passion Fruit Basque Cheesecake	4th	Strawberry and Lemon Trifle	Star Baker
Toby	White Chocolate and Passion Fruit Basque Cheesecake	3rd	'Nanny Mo's' Sherry Trifle	Safe
Tom	Black Sesame & Lemon Curd Basque Cheesecake	1st	'Greek' Trifle	Safe

=== Episode 9: Pâtisserie (Semifinal) ===
The ninth episode is Pâtisserie Week. For the signature challenge, the bakers were given two hours and forty-five minutes to bake twelve cream horns in two different flavors. For the technical challenge, set by Paul, the bakers were asked to bake a framboisier with a fondant rose and a sugar glass dome. For the showstopper challenge, the bakers were asked to make a macaron centerpiece depicting something meaningful to them, with an edible structure at least forty-five centimetres high and displaying a minimum of thirty filled macarons.

Baker	Signature (Cream Horns)	Technical (Framboisier)	Showstopper (Macaron Centerpiece)	Result
Aaron	'Puddings Reimagined' Cream Horns	3rd	'Sloth' Macaron Centerpiece	Safe
Jasmine	Mocha & Raspberry Pistachio Cream Horns	1st	'Christmas Tree' Macaron Centerpiece	Star Baker
Toby	Chocolate, Coffee & Lemon Meringue Pie Cream Horns	4th	'Crate of Lemons' Macaron Centerpiece	Eliminated
Tom	Chocolate Orange & Lemon Raspberry Cream Horns	2nd	'The Beehive' Macaron Centerpiece	Safe

^1 With the exception of Jasmine, none of the bakers could be considered for Star Baker due to missteps in the showstopper round and were all considered for elimination.

=== Episode 10: Final ===
Baker	Signature (12 Iced Finger Buns)	Technical (White Chocolate and Lemon Madeleines)	Showstopper (Table Cake)	Result
Aaron	Pear & Rhubarb Iced Finger Buns	2nd	'Final Tea Party' Table Cake	Runner-up
Jasmine	Apricot & Strawberry Iced Finger Buns	3rd	'Summer Celebration' Table Cake	Winner
Tom	Piña Colada & Hot Dog Iced Finger Buns	1st	'All Roads Lead To The Tent' Table Cake	Runner-up

== Specials ==
Two specials were commissioned for the festive season:

=== The Great Christmas Bake Off ===
The Great Christmas Bake Off featured Peep Show's David Mitchell, Isy Suttie, Matt King, Olivia Colman, and Sophie Winkleman. It first screened on Channel 4 on Christmas Day 2025. The Signature Challenge was Christmas Tree Decorations made in biscuit. The Technical Challenge was to make six miniature Turkey Pies. The Showstopper involved the contestants baking a cake representing their favourite Peep Show moment.

Baker	Signature (Christmas Tree Decorations)	Technical (Miniature Turkey Pies)	Showstopper (Favourite Peep Show Moment Cake)	Result
David	'Shortbread Baubles' Biscuit Tree Decorations	2nd	'Cauliflower is Traditional' Cake	Runner-up
Isy	'Christmas Jumpers' Biscuit Tree Decorations	4th	'Mark and Dobby's Meet Cute' Cake	Runner-up
Matt	'Birds Oft' Forgotten at Christmas' Biscuit Tree Decorations	3rd	'Super Hans in Windsor' Cake	Runner-up
Olivia	'Stained Glass' Biscuit Tree Decorations	1st	'Sophie Buried in the Ball Pit' Cake	Winner
Sophie	'Christmas Angels' Biscuit Tree Decorations	5th	'Big Suze & Mark in Bed' Cake	Runner-up

=== The Great New Year Bake Off ===
The Great New Year Bake Off featured eight bakers from past series competing in pairs: Selasi Gbormittah and Val Stones from Series 7, Briony Williams from Series 9 and Tasha Stones from Series 14, Series 9 winner Rahul Mandal and Series 12 winner Giuseppe Dell'Anno, and Andy Ryan and Nelly Ghaffar from Series 15. For the signature challenge, the bakers were given two hours and thirty minutes to bake twelve savory pies into a festive display. For the technical challenge, set by Paul, the bakers were asked to bake six New Year's chocolate and hazelnut entremets, swapping positions every fifteen minutes. For the showstopper challenge, the bakers were asked to make a biscuit scene depicting a Christmas film.

Bakers	Signature (Festive Pie Display)	Technical (New Year's Entremets)	Showstopper (Christmas Film Biscuit Scene)	Result
Andy & Nelly	'Going Off with a Bang!' Pie Display	4th	'Ticket to the North Pole' Biscuit Scene	Runner-up
Briony & Tasha	'Christmas Wreath' Pie Display	3rd	'Stolen Christmas' Biscuit Scene	Runner-up
Giuseppe & Rahul	'Lucky Feather' Pie Display	2nd	'Spoonful of Sugar' Biscuit Scene	Runner-up
Selasi & Val	'Christmas Tree' Pie Display	1st	'Buddy & the Empire State' Biscuit Scene	Winners

== Ratings ==
Episode no.	Airdate	7-day viewers (millions)	28-day viewers (millions)	Channel 4 weekly ranking	Weekly ranking all channels
1	2 September 2025	7.26	8.73	1	1
2	9 September 2025	7.05	8.50	1	1
3	16 September 2025	6.72	8.10	1	1
4	23 September 2025	6.70	8.03	1	2
5	30 September 2025	6.72	7.92	1	3
6	7 October 2025	6.97	8.05	1	4
7	14 October 2025	6.70	7.71	1	5
8	21 October 2025	6.84	7.81	1	5
9	28 October 2025	7.00	7.65	1	5
10	4 November 2025	6.94	7.36	1	4
