= The Great British Bake Off series 14 =

Season of television series

The Great British Bake Off
- Series 14
- Presented by: Noel Fielding; Alison Hammond
- Judges: Paul Hollywood; Prue Leith
- No. of contestants: 12
- Winner: Matty Edgell
- Runners-up: Josh Smalley; Dan Hunter
- Location: Welford Park, near Newbury, Berkshire
- No. of max. bakes: 30
- No. of episodes: 10

Release
- Original network: Channel 4
- Original release: 26 September – 28 November 2023

Series chronology
- ← Previous; Series 13 Next → Series 15

The fourteenth series of The Great British Bake Off began on 26 September 2023. In December 2022, Matt Lucas announced his departure from the show after three series as a co-presenter. In March 2023, Alison Hammond was announced as his replacement and joined Noel Fielding as co-host. Paul Hollywood and Prue Leith returned to judge the series. The bakers competing in the series were announced on 18 September 2023, and included the show’s first ever deaf contestant.

The series was won by Matty Edgell, with Dan Hunter and Josh Smalley finishing as the runners-up.

== Bakers ==
| Contestant | Age | Hometown | Occupation | Finish | Place |
|---|---|---|---|---|---|
| Amos Lilley | 43 | London, England | Deli and grocery manager | Episode 1 | 12th |
| Keith Barron | 60 | Hampshire, England | Chartered accountant | Episode 2 | 11th |
| Abbi Lawson | 27 | Cumbria, England | Delivery driver | Episode 3 | 10th |
| Nicky Laceby | 52 | Shropshire, England | Retired cabin crew and pet-therapy charity volunteer | Episode 5 | 8th (tie) |
| Rowan Claughton | 21 | West Yorkshire, England | English literature student | Episode 5 | 8th (tie) |
| Dana Conway | 25 | Essex, England | Database administrator | Episode 6 | 7th |
| Saku Chandrasekara | 50 | Herefordshire, England | Intelligence analyst | Episode 7 | 6th |
| Cristy Sharp | 33 | London, England | Personal assistant | Episode 8 | 5th |
| Tasha Stones | 27 | Bristol, England | Children's charity participation officer | Episode 9 | 4th |
| Dan Hunter | 42 | Cheshire, England | Civil engineering resource planner | Episode 10 | Runner-up |
| Josh Smalley | 27 | Leicestershire, England | Chemical biology post-doctoral research associate | Episode 10 | Runner-up |
| Matty Edgell | 28 | Cambridgeshire, England | PE and science teacher | Episode 10 | 1st |

== Results summary ==
| Baker | Episodes | | | | | | | | | |
| Baker | 1 | 2 | 3 | 4 | 5 | 6 | 7 | 8 | 9 | 10 |
|---|---|---|---|---|---|---|---|---|---|---|
| Matty | SAFE | SAFE | SAFE | SB | SAFE | LOW | SAFE | SB | LOW | WINNER |
| Dan | SB | SAFE | LOW | HIGH | SAFE | SAFE | SB | LOW | HIGH | Runner-up |
| Josh | SAFE | HIGH | HIGH | SAFE | HIGH | SB | HIGH | HIGH | SB | Runner-up |
| Tasha | SAFE | SB | SB | N/A^{[a]} | SAFE | HIGH | SAFE | SAFE | OUT | |
| Cristy | HIGH | SAFE | SAFE | LOW | SB | HIGH | LOW | OUT | | |
| Saku | SAFE | SAFE | SAFE | LOW | LOW | LOW | OUT | | | |
| Dana | LOW | SAFE | SAFE | SAFE | LOW | OUT | | | | |
| Nicky | LOW | LOW | SAFE | HIGH | OUT | | | | | |
| Rowan | SAFE | SAFE | LOW | SAFE | OUT | | | | | |
| Abbi | HIGH | SAFE | OUT | | | | | | | |
| Keith | HIGH | OUT | | | | | | | | |
| Amos | OUT | | | | | | | | | |

^{[a]} Tasha was ill and unable to compete during the technical and showstopper in episode 4. As a result, the judges decided that it was unfair to eliminate anyone in her absence.

Colour key:

Baker was one of the judges' least favourite bakers that week, but was not eliminated.
Baker was one of the judges' favourite bakers that week, but was not the Star Baker.
Baker got through to the next round.
Baker did not compete that week.
Baker was eliminated.
Baker was the Star Baker.
Baker was a series runner-up.
Baker was the series winner.

== Episodes ==
=== Episode 1: Cake ===
The first episode is Cake Week. For the first signature challenge, the bakers were given two hours to produce a Vertical Layer Cake made of sponge and icing. For the technical challenge, set by Paul, the bakers were tasked with making "The Great British Bake Off Cake" (the one seen in the credits each week) in two hours, comprising two layers of moist chocolate sponge covered with chocolate ganache and fresh raspberries. A 3D cake replica of an animal of the bakers' choosing was set as the showstopper; the bakers were given four hours, the judges expecting the bake to be mostly sponge.

| Baker | Signature (Vertical Layer Cake) | Technical (The Great British Bake Off Cake) | Showstopper (Animal Cake) | Result |
|---|---|---|---|---|
| Abbi | Foraged Poppy Seed, Lemon & Blackcurrant Vertical Layer Cake | 3rd | 'Herbert the Herdwick' Cake | Safe |
| Amos | Blood Orange & Dark Chocolate Vertical Layer Cake | 2nd | 'Orca on a Wave' Cake | Eliminated |
| Cristy | 'Lemon Meringue' Vertical Layer Cake | 6th | 'Raspberry Ripple' Duck Cake | Safe |
| Dan | Rhubarb & Custard Vertical Layer Cake | 1st | 'Bruno' Cake | Star Baker |
| Dana | 'Salted Caramel Latte' Vertical Layer Cake | 12th | 'My Amazing Gracie' Cake | Safe |
| Josh | 'Tropical' Vertical Layer Cake | 8th | 'Mum's Highland Cow' Cake | Safe |
| Keith | 'Dad's Chocolate Orange' Vertical Layer Cake | 4th | 'Maisie' Cake | Safe |
| Matty | 'Tiramisu' Vertical Layer Cake | 7th | 'Marty the Cocker Spaniel' Cake | Safe |
| Nicky | 'St. Clements' Vertical Layer Cake | 10th | 'Always Beavering Around' Cake | Safe |
| Rowan | Chocolate & Raspberry Vertical Layer Cake | 9th | 'Cosmopolitan Lobster' Cake | Safe |
| Saku | Chaminda's Favourite Vertical Layer Cake | 5th | 'Tikiri the Turtle' Cake | Safe |
| Tasha | Black Sesame & Yuzu Vertical Layer Cake | 11th | Robin Cake | Safe |

=== Episode 2: Biscuits ===
In Biscuit Week the signature bake was twelve Marshmallow biscuits of whatever form in 2 1/2 hours. In the technical challenge, set by Prue, the bakers had 1 1/2 hours to bake twelve custard cream biscuits. The showstopper challenge gave them four hours to bake an Illusion Biscuit display which represented the bakers favourite meal.

| Baker | Signature (12 Marshmallow Biscuits) | Technical (12 Custard Creams) | Showstopper (Illusion Biscuit Display) | Result |
|---|---|---|---|---|
| Abbi | 'Flavours of Tunisia' Marshmallow Biscuits | 1st | 'Dim Sum Brunch' Illusion Biscuits | Safe |
| Cristy | 'Nanny June's' Marshmallow Biscuits | 9th | 'Family Charcuterie Board' Illusion Biscuits | Safe |
| Dan | 'Waterwheel' Marshmallow Biscuits | 2nd | 'Cheese & Onion Pie' Illusion Biscuits | Safe |
| Dana | 'Mallow-Dramatic' Marshmallow Biscuits | 7th | 'Friday Night Takeaway' Illusion Biscuits | Safe |
| Josh | 'Black Forest' Marshmallow Biscuits | 6th | 'JJ's Burger & Fries' Illusion Biscuits | Safe |
| Keith | 'Letter from America' Marshmallow Biscuits | 11th | 'Seaside Meal Deal' Illusion Biscuits | Eliminated |
| Matty | 'Half-Time' Marshmallow Biscuits | 5th | 'Cheeseboard' Illusion Biscuits | Safe |
| Nicky | 'Tasty Teatime Treat' Marshmallow Biscuits | 4th | 'A Home from Home Steak Pie' Illusion Biscuits | Safe |
| Rowan | Lemon, Rosemary & Violet Marshmallow Biscuits | 3rd | ‘Charcuterie Board’ Illusion Biscuits | Safe |
| Saku | Pistachio & Raspberry Marshmallow Biscuits | 10th | 'Sri Lankan Breakfast Feast' Illusion Biscuits | Safe |
| Tasha | 'After-School Treat' Marshmallow Biscuits | 8th | 'Japanese Katsu & Matcha' Illusion Biscuits | Star Baker |

=== Episode 3: Bread ===
The bakers were tasked with making their own cottage loaf in 2 3/4 hours for the signature challenge. For the technical challenge, set by Paul, the task was baking 8 Devonshire Splits, i.e. buns which are split in half and are filled with jam, clotted cream and strawberries, in 2 1/2 hours. In the showstopper, the bakers were given four hours to make a sweet or savoury Plaited Centrepiece Loaf that featured two different types of flour.

| Baker | Signature (Cottage Loaf) | Technical (8 Devonshire Splits) | Showstopper (Plaited Centrepiece Loaf) | Result |
|---|---|---|---|---|
| Abbi | 'Country Kitchen' Cottage Loaf | 8th | 'My Favourite Tree' Plaited Centrepiece | Eliminated |
| Cristy | Cranberry, Rosemary & Walnut Cottage Loaf | 6th | Honey & Chocolate Plaited Centrepiece | Safe |
| Dan | Wild Garlic Cottage Loaf | 10th | 'Stuffed Crust Pizza' Plaited Centrepiece | Safe |
| Dana | 'Bread-ley Cooper' Cottage Loaf | 3rd | 'Tea Beside the Sea' Plaited Centrepiece | Safe |
| Josh | 'Nduja' Pizza Cottage Loaf | 4th | 'Tiger Mascot' Plaited Centrepiece | Safe |
| Matty | Olive & Tomato Cottage Loaf | 7th | 'The Hammers' Plaited Centrepiece | Safe |
| Nicky | Roast Garlic & Rosemary Cottage Loaf | 5th | 'Angus the Highland Cow' Plaited Centrepiece | Safe |
| Rowan | Olive & Tomato Cottage Loaf | 9th | 'A Bread Rowan Tree' Plaited Centrepiece | Safe |
| Saku | Cinnamon & Orange Cottage Loaf | 1st | 'Peacock on a Branch' Plaited Centrepiece | Safe |
| Tasha | Roast Garlic and Rosemary Malted Cottage Loaf | 2nd | 'Medusa' Plaited Centrepiece | Star Baker |

=== Episode 4: Chocolate ===
A "luxurious" chocolate torte, to be made without wheat flour in 2 1/2 hours, was set as the signature challenge. The technical challenge, set by Prue, required six individual-sized caramelized white chocolate and blackcurrant cheesecakes to be baked in two hours. For the showstopper the bakers were given four hours to make an "Edible Chocolate Box Cake" — an edible chocolate box with filled molded chocolates and containing a chocolate cake.

| Baker | Signature (Chocolate Torte) | Technical (6 White Chocolate & Blackcurrant Cheesecake) | Showstopper (Edible Chocolate Box Cake) | Result (Note: Tasha returned home after falling ill during the technical challenge and did not participate in the showstopper. As a result, the judges decided not to eliminate anyone, and the following episode would include a double elimination.) |
|---|---|---|---|---|
| Cristy | Cherry & Chocolate Torte | 7th | 'For Love' Chocolate Box Cake | Safe |
| Dan | Chilli and Chocolate Torte | 1st | 'A Treasure Chest of Delight' Chocolate Box Cake | Safe |
| Dana | 'I Cherry-ish You' Chocolate Torte | 5th | 'Once Upon a Time' Chocolate Box Cake | Safe |
| Josh | Raspberry & Chocolate Torte | 6th | 'Chemistry Centenary' Chocolate Box Cake | Safe |
| Matty | Hazelnut & Chocolate Torte | 2nd | Chocolate Box Cake | Star Baker |
| Nicky | 'Dreamy' Chocolate Torte | 4th | 'This is No Ordinary Chocolate Box' Cake | Safe |
| Rowan | 'Mocha' Chocolate Torte | 3rd | 'Grandpa's Paints' Chocolate Box Cake | Safe |
| Saku | Chocolate & Raspberry Torte | 8th | 'Time for Cricket' Chocolate Box Cake | Safe |
| Tasha | Ginger, Almond & Dark Chocolate Torte | Did not finish | Did not compete | Safe |

=== Episode 5: Pastry ===
For the signature challenge, the bakers were required to produce twelve individual savoury picnic pies, made with hot water crust pastry, in two hours. The technical challenge, set by Paul, asked the bakers to bake a Dauphinoise Pithivier, using flaky "rough puff" pastry and accompanied by a blue cheese sauce, in two hours and forty-five minutes. The showstopper challenge tasked the bakers with making a decorative sweet pie display with a minimum of three pies, in fours hours; the judges expected them to have a sweet pastry case.

| Baker | Signature (12 Savoury Picnic Pies) | Technical (Dauphinoise Pithivier) | Showstopper (Decorative Sweet Pie Display) | Result |
|---|---|---|---|---|
| Cristy | Creamy Mushroom & Leek Picnic Pies | 5th | 'Autumnal Lattice' Decorative Pies | Star Baker |
| Dan | Lamb Keema Picnic Pies | 1st | 'Journey Around South America' Decorative Pies | Safe |
| Dana | 'Spud-tacular' Picnic Pies | 2nd | 'The Apple of my Pie' Decorative Pies | Safe |
| Josh | 'Post-Match'’ Picnic Pies | 8th | 'From Flour to Flower' Decorative Pies | Safe |
| Matty | 'Spanakopità' Picnic Pies | 7th | 'Ski Trip' Decorative Pies | Safe |
| Nicky | Pork & Cheese Picnic Pies | 9th | 'Gran's Garden Trio' Decorative Pies | Eliminated |
| Rowan | Pork & Sweet Potato Picnic Pies | 4th | 'Lattice Fabulous' Decorative Pies | Eliminated |
| Saku | Spicy Tuna Picnic Pies | 6th | 'Pie Chart' Decorative Pies | Safe |
| Tasha | Sausage, Apple & Cranberry Picnic Pies | 3rd | 'Sea or Ski?' Decorative Pies | Safe |

=== Episode 6: Botanical ===
The signature challenge asked the bakers to make twelve individual spiced buns in two hours and forty-five minutes. Prue's technical challenge tasked them with making a lemon and thyme drizzle cake, topped with crystallised lemon peel and thyme, in 1½ hours. The showstopper challenge required the bakers to make a floral dessert, in any style but with at least one significant baked element, and celebrating flowers in flavours and design, in 4 1/2 hours.

| Baker | Signature (12 Spiced Buns) | Technical (Lemon and Thyme Drizzle Cake) | Showstopper (Floral Dessert) | Result |
|---|---|---|---|---|
| Cristy | Maple, Pecan & Cinnamon Spiced Buns | 1st | Elderflower, Strawberry & Rhubarb Floral Dessert | Safe |
| Dan | 'Dreaming of Greece' Spiced Buns | 3rd | 'Sunny Meadows' Floral Dessert | Safe |
| Dana | 'Bun in a Million' Spiced Buns | 6th | 'Stop and Smell the Rosé' Floral Dessert | Eliminated |
| Josh | Lemon & Blueberry Spiced Buns | 2nd | Rhubarb, Raspberry & Hibiscus Floral Dessert | Star Baker |
| Matty | 'Rum Drunk' Spiced Buns | 4th | Blackberry & Elderflower Floral Dessert | Safe |
| Saku | Swedish Cinnamon Spiced Buns | 5th | Earl Grey & Hibiscus Floral Dessert | Safe |
| Tasha | 'Yultide' Spiced Buns | 7th | Elderflower & Hibiscus Floral Dessert | Safe |

=== Episode 7: Desserts ===
The signature challenge required the bakers to produce eight crème caramels in 2 3/4 hours. The technical challenge, set by Paul, tasked them with making six individual orange and ginger treacle puddings in 1 1/2 hours. A meringue bombe with a dessert of the bakers' choice inside was set as the showstopper, to be made in four hours.

| Baker | Signature (8 Crème Caramels) | Technical (6 Orange and Ginger Treacle Puddings) | Showstopper (Meringue Bombe) | Result |
|---|---|---|---|---|
| Cristy | Orange Crème Caramels | 4th | 'Croquembouche' Meringue Bombe | Safe |
| Dan | 'Thai Green Curry' Crème Caramels | 2nd | 'Pale Blue Dot' Meringue Bombe | Star Baker |
| Josh | 'Nan's Favourite' Crème Caramels | 3rd | 'Game, Set and Match' Meringue Bombe | Safe |
| Matty | Chai Crème Caramels | 6th | 'English Italian Summer' Meringue Bombe | Safe |
| Saku | 'Mini Watalappan' Crème Caramels | 5th | 'Flowers for my Bee' Meringue Bombe | Eliminated |
| Tasha | Fig, Honey and Rosemary Crème Caramels | 1st | Plum and Ginger Meringue Bombe | Safe |

=== Episode 8: Party (Quarterfinals) ===
The signature challenge required the bakers to make twelve sausage rolls, using the pastry of their choice, in two hours. The technical challenge, set by Paul, asked the bakers to make a chocolate caterpillar cake in 2 1/2 hours. The bakers had 4½ hours to make their showstopper challenge, a colourful and decorative 'Anything But Beige' Buffet display of a mixture of sweet and savory party foods, baking at least 12 of each item.

| Baker | Signature (12 Sausage Rolls) | Technical (Chocolate Caterpillar Cake) | Showstopper ('Anything But Beige' Buffet) | Result |
|---|---|---|---|---|
| Cristy | Cranberry & Sage Sausage Rolls | 2nd | 'Marvellous Sweet Factory' Buffet | Eliminated |
| Dan | 'Dumplings in Disguise' Sausage Rolls | 5th | 'Prehistoric Party Poopers' Buffet | Safe |
| Josh | Turkey & Cranberry ‘Christmas’ Sausage Rolls | 4th | 'It's Christmas!!!' Buffet | Safe |
| Matty | 'Classic' Sausage Rolls | 3rd | 'Sports' Buffet | Star Baker |
| Tasha | 'Cider in the Park' Sausage Rolls | 1st | 'Birthdays on the Farm' Buffet | Safe |

=== Episode 9: Patisserie (Semifinal) ===
Patisserie week's signature challenge was for the bakers to make two batches of twelve decorated financiers in two hours. The technical challenge, set by Prue, was to bake a tarte aux pommes with short buttery pastry, with a smooth almond frangipane and apple puree, and topped with arranged glazed apple slices, all in 2 1/2 hours. The showstopper challenge gave the bakers four hours to produce a Millefoglie, an elegant highly decorated Italian celebration cake with at least four layers of buttery, flaky puff pastry, in four hours.

| Baker | Signature (24 Financiers) | Technical (Tarte aux Pommes) | Showstopper (Millefoglie) | Result |
|---|---|---|---|---|
| Dan | Fancy Financiers | 3rd | 'Hypersonic' Millefoglie | Safe |
| Josh | Perfect Pudding Financiers | 1st | Lemon, Blackberry & Blackcurrant Millefoglie | Star Baker |
| Matty | 'Pick Me Up' Financiers | 2nd | 'Taste of Italy' Millefoglie | Safe |
| Tasha | 'Fancy Fruit & Nut' Financiers | 4th | 'Mango Mojito' Millefoglie | Eliminated |

=== Episode 10: Final ===
The final signature challenge tasked the bakers with making eight éclairs in two different flavors, in two hours and fifteen minutes. The final technical challenge, set by Paul, asked the bakers to make nine Lardy cake slices in three hours. The final showstopper challenge was for the bakers to make an elegant celebration cake with at least three tiers, inspired by their first bake, in 4 1/2 half hours. Based on the judges' comments during deliberations, Dan can be seen as an unofficial third place, as they said Josh and Matty were in line to win.

| Baker | Signature (8 Éclairs) | Technical (9 Lardy Cake Slices) | Showstopper (Elegant Tiered Celebration Cake) | Result |
|---|---|---|---|---|
| Dan | 'He Who Dares, Éclairs!' | 2nd | 'Lemon Drizzle Memory Lane' Cake | Runner-up |
| Josh | Tropical and Mocha Éclairs | 1st | 'A Slice For All Seasons' Cake | Runner-up |
| Matty | Black Forest and Banoffee Éclairs | 3rd | 'Final Celebration' Cake | Winner |

== Specials ==
Two specials were commissioned for the festive season:

=== The Great Christmas Bake Off ===
The Great Christmas Bake Off featured Series 8 winner Sophie Faldo, Dan Beasley-Harling from Series 9, Amelia Le Bruin from Series 10, Linda Rayfield from Series 11, George Aristidou from Series 12, and Carole Edwards from Series 13.

For the signature challenge, the bakers had to make 12 mince pies using any pastry, with a festive filling, in 2 hours. The technical challenge, set by Paul, was a tear and share cinnamon snowflake bread, with an enriched dough, in 2¾ hours. The showstopper challenge, was to bake an exquisite celebration cake based on redemption, with any style and flavours, in 4 hours.

| Baker | Signature (Mince Pies) | Technical (Tear and Share Cinnamon Snowflake Bread) | Showstopper (Redemption Celebration Cake) | Result |
|---|---|---|---|---|
| Amelia | ‘Star’ Mince Pies | 3rd | Pistachio and Orange ‘Redemption’ Cake | Runner-up |
| Carole | ‘Typically Tropical’ Mince Pies | 6th | ‘O Christmas Tree, ‘O Christmas Tree’ Cake | Runner-up |
| Dan | ‘Merry Cherry Magic’ Mince Pies | 2nd | ‘Pearfully Does It’ Cake | Runner-up |
| George | ‘Merry Cherry’ Mince Pies | 5th | ‘Roll on Christmas’ Cake | Runner-up |
| Linda | ‘Festive Fun’ Mince Pies | 4th | ‘Festive Revival’ Cake | Runner-up |
| Sophie | ‘Skiing at Christmas’ Mince Pies | 1st | ‘Christmas Candle Centerpiece’ Cake | Winner |

=== The Great New Year Bake Off ===
The Great New Year Bake Off featured Mark Lutton from Series 11, Jürgen Krauss and Maggie Richardson both from Series 12, and Maxy Maligisa from Series 13.

The signature challenge was for the bakers to make 12 Religieuse with a festive theme in two hours. The technical challenge, set by Paul, was for the bakers to make a Galette Des Rois with crisp, buttery pastry and an almond frangipane filling in two hours. The showstopper challenge was for the bakers to create an exquisite New Year’s Smash Cake that had a chocolate dome shell, in 4 hours.

| Baker | Signature (Religieuse) | Technical (Galette Des Rois) | Showstopper (Smash Cake) | Result |
|---|---|---|---|---|
| Jürgen | ‘Lucky Chimney Sweeps’ Religieuse | 4th | ‘New Year’s Sunrise’ Smash Cake | Runner-up |
| Maggie | ‘New Year’s Day Party’ Religieuse | 3rd | ‘Winter Fun’ Smash Cake | Runner-up |
| Mark | ‘Boozy Relig-eusey’ | 2nd | ‘Tropical Snowman’ Smash Cake | Runner-up |
| Maxy | ‘Away In A Manger’ Religieuse | 1st | ‘Phoenix’ Smash Cake | Winner |

== Ratings ==
The first episode of the 14th series has an overnight viewing figure of 4.3 million, a slight fall from the 4.4 million of 2022.

| Episode no. | Airdate | 7-day viewers (millions) | Channel 4 weekly ranking | Weekly ranking all channels |
|---|---|---|---|---|
| 1 | 26 September 2023 | 7.84 | 1 | 2 |
| 2 | 3 October 2023 | 7.54 | 1 | 2 |
| 3 | 10 October 2023 | 7.28 | 1 | 3 |
| 4 | 18 October 2023 | 7.12 | 1 | 4 |
| 5 | 24 October 2023 | 5.89 | 1 | 4 |
| 6 | 31 October 2023 | 6.32 | 1 | 3 |
| 7 | 7 November 2023 | 6.94 | 1 | 3 |
| 8 | 14 November 2023 | 6.77 | 1 | 4 |
| 9 | 21 November 2023 | 6.47 | 1 | 11 |
| 10 | 28 November 2023 | 6.75 | 1 | 10 |
