= The Great British Bake Off series 13 =

The Great British Bake Off
- Series 13
- Presented by: Noel Fielding; Matt Lucas
- Judges: Paul Hollywood; Prue Leith
- No. of contestants: 12
- Winner: Syabira Yusoff
- Runners-up: Abdul Rehman Sharif; Sandro Farmhouse
- Location: Welford Park, near Newbury, Berkshire
- No. of max. bakes: 30
- No. of episodes: 10

Release
- Original network: Channel 4
- Original release: 13 September – 15 November 2022

Series chronology
- ← Previous; Series 12 Next → Series 14

The thirteenth series of The Great British Bake Off began on 13 September 2022. It is again presented by Noel Fielding and Matt Lucas and judged by Paul Hollywood and Prue Leith. The bakers competing in the series were announced on 2 September 2022. The series was filmed at Welford Park, an estate near Newbury, Berkshire which was previously used for the programme from 2014 to 2019.

The season was won by Syabira Yusoff, with Abdul Rehman Sharif and Nelsandro "Sandro" Farmhouse finishing as the runners-up. Yusoff is the first female winner since Sophie Faldo from Season 8.

This was the final series presented by Matt Lucas, who announced his departure from the programme on 6 December 2022.

== Bakers ==
Contestant	Age	Hometown	Occupation	Finish	Place
Will Hawkins	45	London, England	Former charity director	Episode 1	12th
Maisam Algirgeet	18	Manchester, England	Student and sales assistant	Episode 2	11th
James Dewar	25	Cumbria, England	Nuclear scientist	Episode 4	9th (tie)
Rebecca 'Rebs' Lightbody	23	County Antrim, Northern Ireland	Masters student	Episode 4	9th (tie)
Carole Edwards	59	Dorset, England	Supermarket cashier	Episode 5	8th
Dawn Hollyoak	60	Bedfordshire, England	IT manager	Episode 6	7th
Kevin Flynn	33	Lanarkshire, Scotland	Music teacher	Episode 7	6th
Marie-Therese 'Maxy' Maligisa	29	London, England	Architectural assistant	Episode 8	5th
Janusz Domagala	34	East Sussex, England	Personal assistant to head teacher	Episode 9	4th
Abdul Rehman Sharif	29	London, England	Electronics engineer	Episode 10	Runner-up
Nelsandro "Sandro" Farmhouse	30	London, England	Nanny	Episode 10	Runner-up
Syabira Yusoff	32	London, England	Cardiovascular research associate	Episode 10	1st

== Results summary ==
Elimination chart
Baker	1	2	3	4	5	6	7	8	9	10
Syabira	HIGH	HIGH	HIGH	SAFE	LOW	SB	SB	SB	HIGH	WINNER
Abdul	SAFE	HIGH	^{[a]}	SAFE	SAFE	SAFE	SAFE	HIGH	SB	Runner-up
Sandro	HIGH	HIGH	HIGH	HIGH	SB	SAFE	HIGH	LOW	LOW	Runner-up
Janusz	SB	SAFE	SB	HIGH	HIGH	SAFE	LOW	SAFE	OUT	
Maxy	SAFE	SB	SAFE	SB	SAFE	HIGH	SAFE	OUT		
Kevin	SAFE	SAFE	LOW	SAFE	SAFE	LOW	OUT			
Dawn	HIGH	HIGH	LOW	HIGH	LOW	OUT				
Carole	SAFE	LOW	LOW	LOW	OUT					
James	SAFE	HIGH	SAFE	OUT						
Rebs	LOW	LOW	^{[a]}	OUT						
Maisam	LOW	OUT								
Will	OUT									

^{[a]} Abdul and Rebs were ill and unable to compete in episode 3; at the end of the episode, the judges decided it was unfair to eliminate anyone in their absence.

Colour key:

Baker was one of the judges' least favourite bakers that week, but was not eliminated.
Baker was one of the judges' favourite bakers that week, but was not the Star Baker.
Baker got through to the next round.
Baker did not compete that week.
Baker was eliminated.
Baker was the Star Baker.
Baker was a series runner-up.
Baker was the series winner.

== Episodes ==
Colour key:

Baker was eliminated at conclusion of episode
Baker received a "Hollywood handshake" for respective bake
Baker was named "Star Baker" at conclusion of episode
Baker was named runner-up for the series
Baker won series

=== Episode 1: Cake ===
For the first signature challenge, the bakers were required to bake twelve identical mini sandwich cakes in two hours. For the technical challenge, set by Paul, the bakers were tasked with making a six-layered red velvet cake in two hours, each layer sandwiched with cream cheese frosting and sprinkled with red crumbs. A 3D cake replica of a home that the bakers once lived in was set as the showstopper; the bakers were given four hours, the judges expecting the bake to be full of detail.

Baker	Signature (12 Mini Sandwich Cakes)	Technical (Red Velvet Cake)	Showstopper (Cake Home)	Result
Abdul	'Cake-y Cacti'	6th	'Summer In Pakistan'	Safe
Carole	'To Bee or not to Bee'	8th	'Little House In The Country'	Safe
Dawn	Lime, Coconut & Tamarind Spring Cakes	3rd	'Nan's House'	Safe
James	Sticky Toffee Apple Candles	12th	'Last House On The Loch'	Safe
Janusz	Pistachio & Cherry Vodka Liquor Wuzetka	7th	'Home Is Where The Flowers Grow'	Star Baker
Kevin	Mini Persian Love Cakes	4th	'Ba-Na-Na That's My Hame'	Safe
Maisam	Pistachio Cakes with Raspberry Buttercream	5th	'My Childhood Home'	Safe
Maxy	'Mango Magic Mess'	10th	'At My Mama's'	Safe
Rebs	Hazelnut Mocha Latte Mini Cakes	11th	'Piña Colada Cottage'	Safe
Sandro	'A Bitesize of Love'	2nd	'Best Time Ever' Cake	Safe
Syabira	Coconut, Pandan & Caramel Mousse Cake	1st	'Happiest Childhood Memory'	Safe
Will	Ginger & Caramel Squares	9th	'First London Family Home'	Eliminated

=== Episode 2: Biscuits ===
The signature bake was eighteen Decorative macarons with a twist – they must be made to appear like something else. Two hours was given for the challenge. For the technical challenge, set by Prue, the bakers were given one hour and forty-five minutes to bake twelve Garibaldi biscuits with feathered chocolate on top. A 3D biscuit mask to be completed in 4 hours was the showstopper challenge.

Baker	Signature (18 Decorative Macarons)	Technical (Garibaldi Biscuits)	Showstopper (3D Biscuit Mask)	Result
Abdul	'Fudgetastic Maca-Cones'	11th	'Parrot-astic' Biscuits	Safe
Carole	'Just A Mouthful'	4th	'Macaron Masquerade'	Safe
Dawn	'Toy Shop Yarns'	9th	'Baroque-Punk' Mask	Safe
James	'Raccarons'	2nd	Menacing Mask	Safe
Janusz	Miniature Melons	6th	Cubist Mask	Safe
Kevin	Mint Choc Trip	8th	Mythical Mask	Safe
Maisam	Cute Carrots	7th	Venetian Mask	Eliminated
Maxy	Baby Daisies	5th	Masquerade	Star Baker
Rebs	'Wee Branstons'	1st	Floral Fascinator	Safe
Sandro	'Cheat Day Treat'	3rd	Carnival Costume	Safe
Syabira	Satay Macarons	10th	'Two Face, One Soul'	Safe

=== Episode 3: Bread ===
The bakers were set the task of making two sharing-size pizzas in two hours for the signature challenge. The technical challenge, set by Paul, was the baking of twelve pain aux raisins, to be completed in two hours and forty-five minutes. Finally, for their 4 1/2-hour showstopper, the bakers were asked to create their own interpretation of a Swedish celebration 'cake', the Smörgåstårta, topped with exquisite decorations.

Baker	Signature (2 pizzas)	Technical (12 Pain aux raisins)	Showstopper (Smörgåstårta)	Result
Abdul	Did not compete			Safe^{1}
Carole	'Pizza Exceptional'	8th	'Something Fishy' Smörgåstårta	Safe
Dawn	Tex-Mex Pizza	6th	Chicken Souvlaki Smörgåstårta	Safe
James	'It Does Belong!' Ham, Mushroom and Pineapple Pizza	3rd	'The Most Pandastic' Smörgåstårta	Safe
Janusz	Full English Breakfast Pizza	1st	'Fish and Chip Shop' Smörgåstårta	Star Baker
Kevin	'Now Bring Us Some Figgy Pizza'	7th	'I've Started So I'll Fin-ish' Smörgåstårta	Safe
Maxy	Sweet Rosemary Lamb Pizza	2nd	'Curvy Seafood' Smörgåstårta	Safe
Rebs	Did not compete			Safe^{1}
Sandro	Sweet & Spicy Pizza	4th	'Ultimate' Smörgåstårta	Safe
Syabira	Malaysian Prawn Sambal Pizza	5th	Nasi Lemak Smörgåstårta	Safe

^1 Both Abdul and Rebs did not compete due to falling ill. Consequently, no one was eliminated this week but the following week would be a double elimination.

=== Episode 4: Mexican ===
For their signature challenge, the bakers were asked to make twelve individual Pan dulce ("sweet bread" pastries) in 2 1/2 hours. Paul's technical challenge required them to make eight Mexican hand-pressed corn tacos and their fillings, in two hours. The showstopper gave them four hours to make their own four-layer version of a Tres Leches Cake ('three-milk cake', a sponge cake soaked in three kinds of milk).

Baker	Signature (12 Pan dulce)	Technical (8 Tacos)	Showstopper (Tres Leches Cake)	Result
Abdul	Coconut & Raspberry Besos	6th	'Day of the Dead' Tres Leches Cake	Safe
Carole	Orange & Anise Seed Pan Dulce	10th	'Pastel de Chocolate Mexicano' Tres Leches Cake	Safe
Dawn	'Dark Chocolate & Chilli Kick' Conchas	5th	'Blooming' Tres Leches Cake	Safe
James	'Coffee Caramel Oyster' Conchas	8th	Chocolate & Lime 'Many Leches' Cake	Eliminated
Janusz	Cacti Conchas	7th	'Fruity Horchata' Tres Leches Cake	Safe
Kevin	'Sweet Breads are Made of These' Borrachitos	4th	'Meci-Cocoa Pyramid' Tres Leches Cake	Safe
Maxy	'Bella Naranja' Conchas	1st	'Cocoa Flower Fiesta' Tres Leches Cake	Star Baker
Rebs	Lemon Conchas	9th	'Mexican Tiramisu' Tres Leches Cake	Eliminated
Sandro	Filled Concha Buns	3rd	'It's a Fiesta' Tres Leches Cake	Safe
Syabira	Corn on the Cob Conchas	2nd	Sweetcorn & Cinnamon Tres Leches Cake	Safe

=== Episode 5: Desserts ===
For the signature the bakers had two hours to make eight individual steamed puddings, with an accompaniment of their choice. Prue's technical challenge gave them two hours to bake her favourite classic lemon meringue pie. The showstopper challenge required the bakers to produce a three-element mousse-based dessert with a surprise inside, and including three other dessert elements, in four hours, thirty minutes.

Baker	Signature (8 Steamed Puddings)	Technical (Lemon Meringue Pie)	Showstopper (Hidden Surprise Mousse Dessert)	Result
Abdul	Fig & Date Puddings	2nd	'A Little Galaxy' Mousse Dessert	Safe
Carole	'My Little Beauties'	6th	'Strawberry Fields'	Eliminated
Dawn	'Traditional' Steamed Puddings	7th	'Woodland' Mousse Dessert	Safe
Janusz	Piña Colada Puddings	1st	‘Cake Within a Cake Surprise'	Safe
Kevin	Clootie Dumplings	5th	'What The Dog Dug'	Safe
Maxy	Sticky Toffee Puddings	3rd	'Sunset Surprise'	Safe
Sandro	Apple & Cherry Crumble Puddings	4th	'It's a Mousse World'	Star Baker
Syabira	Watermelon Steamed Puddings	8th	'Bee Positive'	Safe

=== Episode 6: Halloween ===
In the program's first-ever Halloween Week, the signature bake was a decorated Apple Cake, to be produced in two hours. The technical challenge set by Paul gave them two hours to produce eight toasted marshmallow and chocolate campfire snack S'mores. The four-hour showstopper challenge asked them to make a Halloween piñata hanging lantern filled with sweet treats.

Baker	Signature (Apple Cake)	Technical (8 S'mores)	Showstopper (Edible Hanging Halloween Piñata Lantern)	Result
Abdul	Bonfire Cake	7th	Witches Lantern	Safe
Dawn	'Ukrainian Sharlotka'	5th	'A Cat in a Fancy Hat' Lantern	Eliminated
Janusz	'Mum's Apple Cake'	2nd	'Halloween Horror Movie Popcorn' Lantern	Safe
Kevin	'Apple Bobbing'	3rd	'Arachna-FOMO' Lantern	Safe
Maxy	Classic Apple & Walnut Cake	6th	'Spoooooky' Lantern	Safe
Sandro	Creepy Apple Crumble Cake	4th	'Dead Disco Ball' Lantern	Safe
Syabira	'Witch Apple'	1st	'Itsy Bitsy Spider' Lantern	Star Baker

=== Episode 7: Custard ===
The signature challenge gave the bakers ninety minutes to produce eight Floating Islands. Prue set a technical challenge giving two hours, forty-five minutes to make six cones filled with pistachio and praline ice cream. The time-sensitive nature of the technical challenge required that the bakers' starting times be staggered (in order—Sandro, Janusz, Syabira, Maxy, Kevin, Abdul) and the judges taste each ice cream cone right after it was completed by the bakers. The showstopper challenge required them to bake a multi-layered gateau featuring a set custard, in four hours.

Baker	Signature (8 Floating Islands)	Technical (6 Pistachio and Praline Ice Cream)	Showstopper (Custard Gateau)	Result
Abdul	Cherry, Orange & Pistachio Floating Islands	4th	Peach & Raspberry Mille-feuille	Safe
Janusz	'Morning Vanilla Latte' Floating Islands	5th	'Neapolitan' Custard Gateau	Safe
Kevin	'Everything's Coming Up Roses' Floating Islands	3rd	'My Honey Valentine' Custard Gateau	Eliminated
Maxy	'Blueberry Lagoon' Floating Islands	2nd	'The Promised Land' Custard Gateau	Safe
Sandro	Cherry, Almond & Hazelnut Floating Island	1st	'Tribute to a Friend' Custard Gateau	Safe
Syabira	Mojito Floating Islands	6th	'Piña Coladas Anyone?' Custard Gateau	Star Baker

=== Episode 8: Pastry (Quarterfinals) ===
The bakers produced a dozen vol-au-vents with a sweet (not the more common savory) filling in the two-hour signature challenge. The technical challenge set by Prue required them to make eight crispy deep-fried spring rolls with a dipping sauce in one hour and twenty minutes. For the showstopper, they were asked to create a spectacular 3D pie scene inspired by a favourite childhood story or nursery rhyme, which involved at least eight pies, all in four hours.

Baker	Signature (12 Sweet Vol-au-vents)	Technical (8 Spring Rolls)	Showstopper (3D Storybook Pie Scene)	Result
Abdul	Coconut and Berry Vol-au-Vents	3rd	'Adventures of a Pie-rate' Pie Scene	Safe
Janusz	'Strawberries & Cream' Vol-au-Vents	2nd	'The Very Hungry Sausage Dog' Pie Scene	Safe
Maxy	'Summertime Fine' Vol-au-Vents	5th	'Spicy Twinkling Stars' Pie Scene	Eliminated
Sandro	'Key-Lime' Vol-au-Vents	1st	Caterpillar Pie Scene	Safe
Syabira	'Citrus Dreams' Vol-au-Vents	4th	'Jack and the Beanstalk' Pie Scene	Star Baker

=== Episode 9: Pâtisserie (Semi-final) ===
In the Patisserie Week signature challenge, the semi-finalist bakers were asked to make six Mini Charlottes in 2 1/2 hours. Prue's technical challenge required they bake four precisely assembled shortcrust pastry vertical tarts in two hours. The showstopper challenge was to make their own version of the Swedish Krokan multi-tiered almond biscuit dough creation in four hours.

Baker	Signature (6 Mini Charlottes)	Technical (4 Chocolate, Hazelnut and Raspberry Vertical Tarts)	Showstopper (Krokan)	Result
Abdul	'Pistachio Tiramisu' Mini-Charlottes	2nd	'To the Stars!' Krokan	Star Baker
Janusz	'Plums in Chocolate' Mini-Charlottes	3rd	'Brighton Pride' Krokan	Eliminated (Note: Viewers were in uproar over Janusz's elimination with TV regulator OFCOM receiving 157 complaints following the airing of the semi-final.)
Sandro	'Caramel Nutty' Mini-Charlottes	4th	'Where it Started to How it's Going' Krokan	Safe
Syabira	'Peanut & Berries' Mini-Charlottes	1st	'The DNA in You' Krokan	Safe

=== Episode 10: Final ===
The signature challenge asked the finalists to produce a perfect picnic, using seasonal British ingredients to make six mini-cakes, six individual vegetarian pies, and six finger sandwiches (first making a classic white bread loaf), in three hours. Paul set the technical challenge, allowing two hours to make a Summer pudding bombe. For the outer shell of their bombe, the bakers were given the unused white bread loaf they baked from their signature challenge. For the 4 1/2 hour showstopper, they needed to make a large edible sculpture on the theme of "Our Beautiful Planet" that consisted of a large cake base and demonstrating three additional baking skills.

Baker	Signature (Seasonal Picnic)	Technical (Summer Pudding Bombe)	Showstopper (Large Planet Themed Edible Sculpture)	Result
Abdul	Summer Picnic	1st	'It's All About The Bees' Edible Sculpture	Runner-up
Sandro	Summer Picnic	3rd	'The World From Different Angles' Edible Sculpture	Runner-up
Syabira	Summer Picnic	2nd	'This is My Home' Edible Sculpture	Winner

== Specials ==
Two specials were commissioned for the festive season:

=== The Great Christmas Bake Off ===
The Great Christmas Bake Off featured five Channel 4 legends in commemoration of the channel's 40th anniversary: Miquita Oliver, Terry Christian, Tony Robinson, Gaby Roslin and Claire Sweeney.

The signature challenge was for the bakers to bake eight individual cakes shaped like baubles, which had to include a filling or an icing, in two hours. The technical challenge, set by Paul, asked the bakers to make a tear and share, with Camembert, in the shape of a Christmas tree, with rough-puff pastry, in one hour and forty-five minutes. The showstopper challenge tasked the bakers to make an edible wreath, made of choux pastry and/or meringue, which had to have a festive filling in three hours.

Baker	Signature (Bauble Cakes)	Technical (Camembert Tear and Share)	Showstopper (Edible Wreath)	Result
Claire	Cherry & Amaretto Bauble Cakes	2nd	Christmas Spiced Edible Wreath	Runner-up
Gaby	Gluten-Free 'Fruity' Bauble Cakes	1st	Passion Fruit 'Big Breakfast' Edible Wreath	Runner-up
Miquita	‘Mirabelle’ Bauble Cakes	3rd	'Abundance & Gratitude' Edible Wreath	Winner
Terry	Chocolate & Brandy Christmas Bauble Cakes	5th	Festive Edible Wreath	Runner-up
Tony	‘Turnip’ Bauble Cakes	4th	'Holy Berry Dog' Edible Wreath	Runner-up

=== The Great New Year Bake Off ===
The Great New Year Bake Off featured Antony Amourdoux and Manon Lagrève (Series 9), Lottie Bedlow (Series 11) and Chigs Parmar (Series 12).

The signature challenge tasked the bakers with making a savoury Wellington in two and a half hours. The technical challenge, set by Prue, was a vegan Baked Alaska in two hours and forty-five minutes. The showstopper challenge was for the bakers to make a bûche entremet in four hours.

Baker	Signature (Savoury Wellington)	Technical (Vegan Baked Alaska)	Showstopper (Bûche Entremet)	Result
Antony	'Kerala Coconut Beef Fry' Wellington	4th	'My Chestnuts With Love' Bûche	Runner-up
Chigs	'Festive Jerk Lamb' Wellington	2nd	'Bougie Bûche'	Runner-up
Lottie	'It was the Salmon' Wellington	3rd	'The Original Yule Log'	Runner-up
Manon	Salmon Roulade Wellington	1st	'Triple Chocolate Village' Bûche	Winner

== Reception ==
Fans on social media criticised the thirteenth series, including the following aspects of the final week: time limit as too short, tasks as heavily complex within time allowed, bakes as short on quality, and judges' perceived overly negative comments.

Besides what fans noted, Nicola Austin of Digital Spy further criticised the series's Technical challenges as the production's intentions for amateur bakers "to fail", highlight one-step instruction, "Make a lemon meringue pie", for week five's (Dessert) "Lemon Meringue Pie"; and lack of instructions to properly use vegetarian gelatin for the finale's "Summer Pudding Bombe". Austin further stated, "[M]uch of the judges' precise specifications, timings and presentation requirements now lean more towards professional standards," different from what Bake Off initially intended to be. She further criticised the series's "stereotypical presentation of Mexican culture" in episode five and other "faux pas on display", like Halloween-themed bakes in episode six and spring rolls as a Technical challenge.

In response to the fan backlash, especially toward the Mexican Week, the producers' decision not to produce nationality-themed challenges for the following fourteenth series was made although this was met with further backlash from TV chef Antony Worrall Thompson.

Contestant Dawn Hollyoak died on 5 July 2024, aged 61, with Hollywood and Leith leading tributes.

== Ratings ==
Episode no.	Airdate	7-day viewers (millions)	Channel 4 weekly ranking	Weekly ranking all channels
1	13 September 2022	8.30	1	1
2	20 September 2022	7.60	1	5
3	27 September 2022	7.35	1	3
4	4 October 2022	7.76	1	3
5	11 October 2022	8.32	1	2
6	18 October 2022	7.79	1	3
7	25 October 2022	7.51	1	3
8	1 November 2022	7.41	1	4
9	8 November 2022	7.70	1	10
10	15 November 2022	8.13	1	10
