= Pithivier =

Round, enclosed French pie

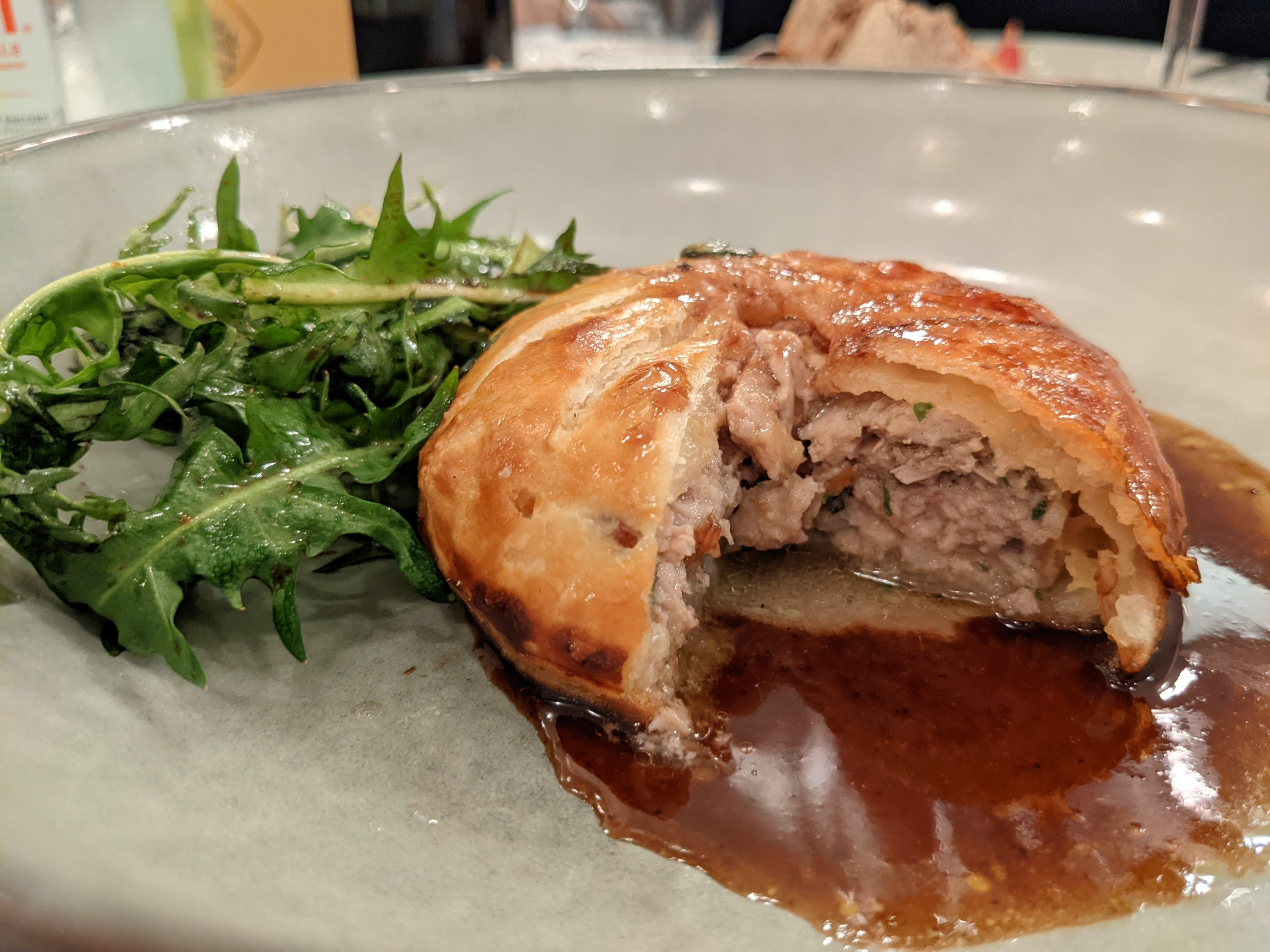
- Type: Pie
- Place of origin: France
- Region or state: Pithiviers
- Main ingredients: Puff pastry, frangipane of almond paste if sweet

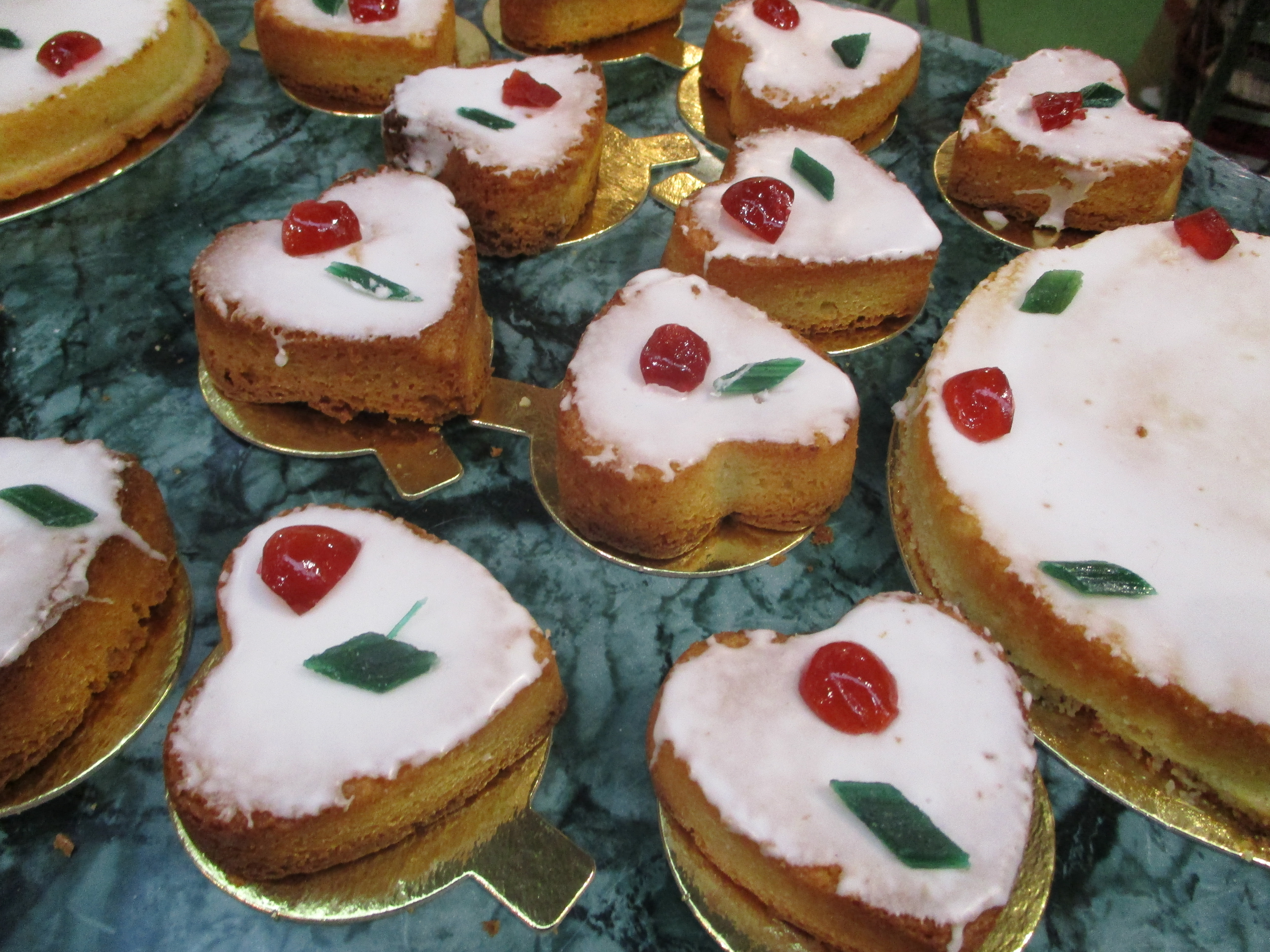
Gateaux pithiviers fondant

A pithivier (English: /pɪtɪˈvjeɪ/; French: pithiviers, IPA: [pitivje]) is a round, enclosed pie usually made by baking two disks of puff pastry, with a filling stuffed in between. It has the appearance of a hump and is traditionally decorated with spiral lines drawn from the top outwards with the point of a knife, and scalloping on the edge. It is named after the French town of Pithiviers, where the dish is commonly assumed to originate.

A small mound of filling is positioned at the centre of the lower layer of pastry, rather than spread on it, so as to prevent it from leaking during baking. The pie is traditionally finished with a distinct shine to the top of the crust, by brushing on an egg wash beforehand, or by caramelising a dusting of confectioner's sugar at the end of baking, or both.

It is similar to the galette des rois made for Epiphany made in the northern half of France, although the pithivier is made all year.

The filling of the pithivier is often a sweet cream of almonds and not frangipane as in the galette des rois, but savoury pies with vegetable, meat or cheese filling can also be called pithivier.

== See also ==
- List of pies, tarts and flans
- List of French desserts
