= Kransekage =

Traditional Danish and Norwegian confection

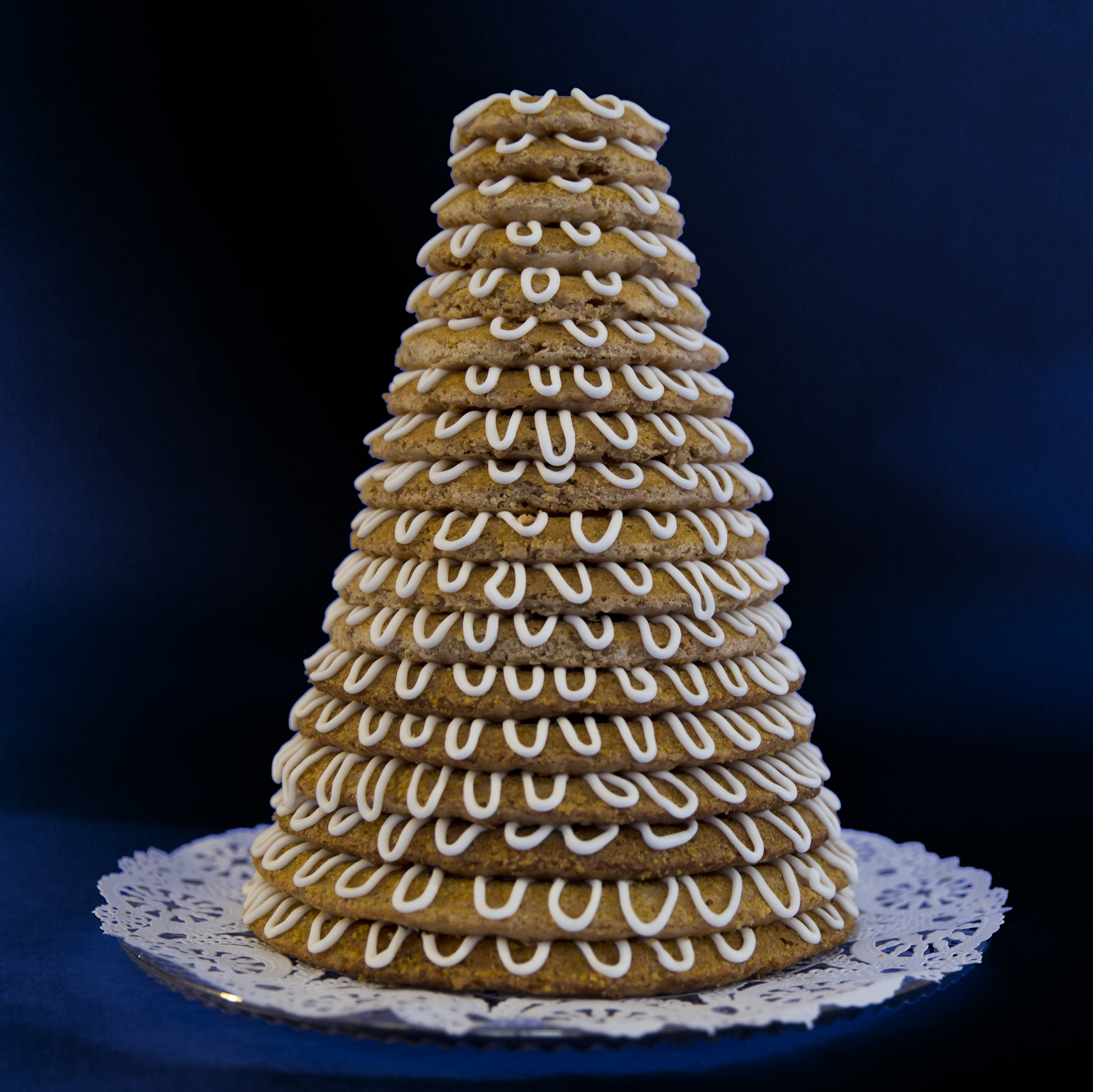
- An 18-layer kransekake decorated with white icing
- Alternative names: kransekage, kransekake, kransakaka
- Type: Cake
- Course: Dessert
- Region or state: Scandinavia
- Serving temperature: Cold
- Main ingredients: Almonds, sugar, egg whites
- Variations: Overflødighedshorn

Kransekage (Danish: [ˈkʁ̥ɑnsəˌkʰæːjə]), kransekake (Norwegian) or kransakaka (Icelandic) is a traditional Danish and Norwegian confection, often eaten on special occasions in Scandinavia. In English, the name means 'wreath cake'. In Norway it is alternatively referred to as tårnkake (English: 'tower cake') and often prepared for Constitution Day celebrations, Christmas, weddings, and baptisms. In Denmark it is typically eaten as part of New Year celebrations, while a variation of the cake, overflødighedshorn (English: 'cornucopia'), is traditionally served at weddings and baptisms.

== History ==
The origin of the kransekage can be traced to the 18th century, where it was first created by a baker in Copenhagen.

Almonds were very expensive in the 18th century, and as a result, the almond-rich kransekage became a way for wealthy people to display their wealth.

== Preparation ==
A kransekage takes the form of a series of concentric rings of cake, layered on top of each other in order to form a steep-sloped cone shape—often 18 or more layers—stuck together with white icing. Kransekake cake rings are made with almonds, sugar, and egg whites. The ideal kransekake is hard to the touch, yet soft and chewy.

== Serving ==
This confection is served by separating individual rings and breaking them into smaller pieces. In recent years the kransekake when mass-produced is sold year round in the shape of dessert bars. Mass-produced kransekake is available in stores around Christmas and before New Year's Eve.

One cultural tradition is for the wedding couple to lift the top layer of the cake at their wedding. The number of cake rings that stick to the top one when they lift it is said to be the number of children the couple will have.

The world's tallest kransekake was baked in 2006 by the supermarket Coop in Oslo in celebration of their 100th anniversary. The cake was 13.17 meters (43.2 ft) tall and made from over 700 kilograms of dough.

== Variations ==
The original variant used at weddings is called overflødighedshorn (English: 'horn of plenty') and is shaped like a cornucopia and filled with chocolates, cookies, and other small treats. Sometimes a bottle of wine or akvavit is placed in the center, and the cake is decorated with ornaments such as crackers and flags.

Bite-sized versions of the cake, called kransekakestenger (English: 'wreath cake rods') are often prepared for Christmas. The cake is prepared in the same way as with the original version, but instead of being formed into rings they are set into small, straight portions between 5–8 cm (2–3 in) long. They are then similarly decorated with white icing, though they may also be dipped in chocolate.

== Gallery ==
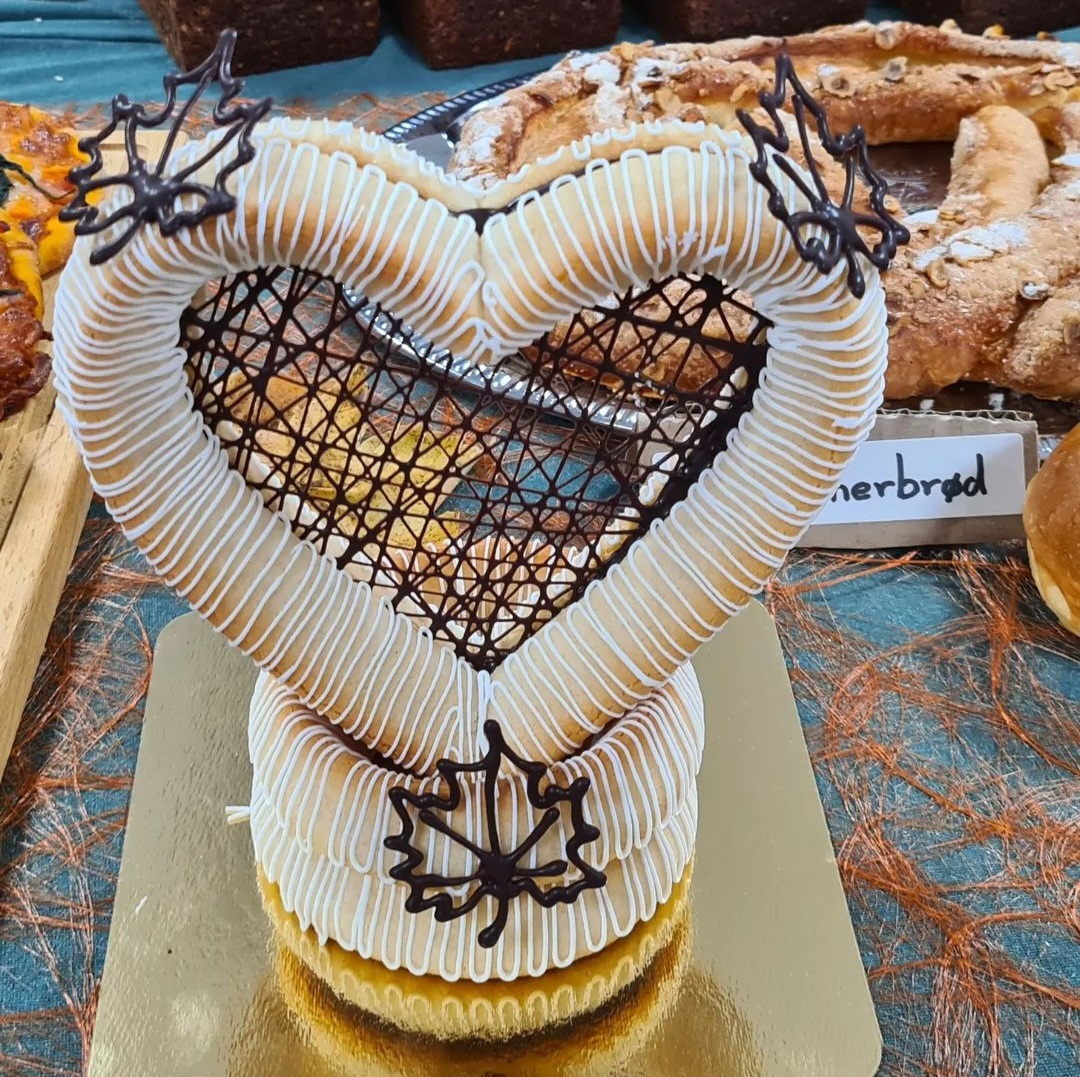
Danish kransekage in the form of a heart

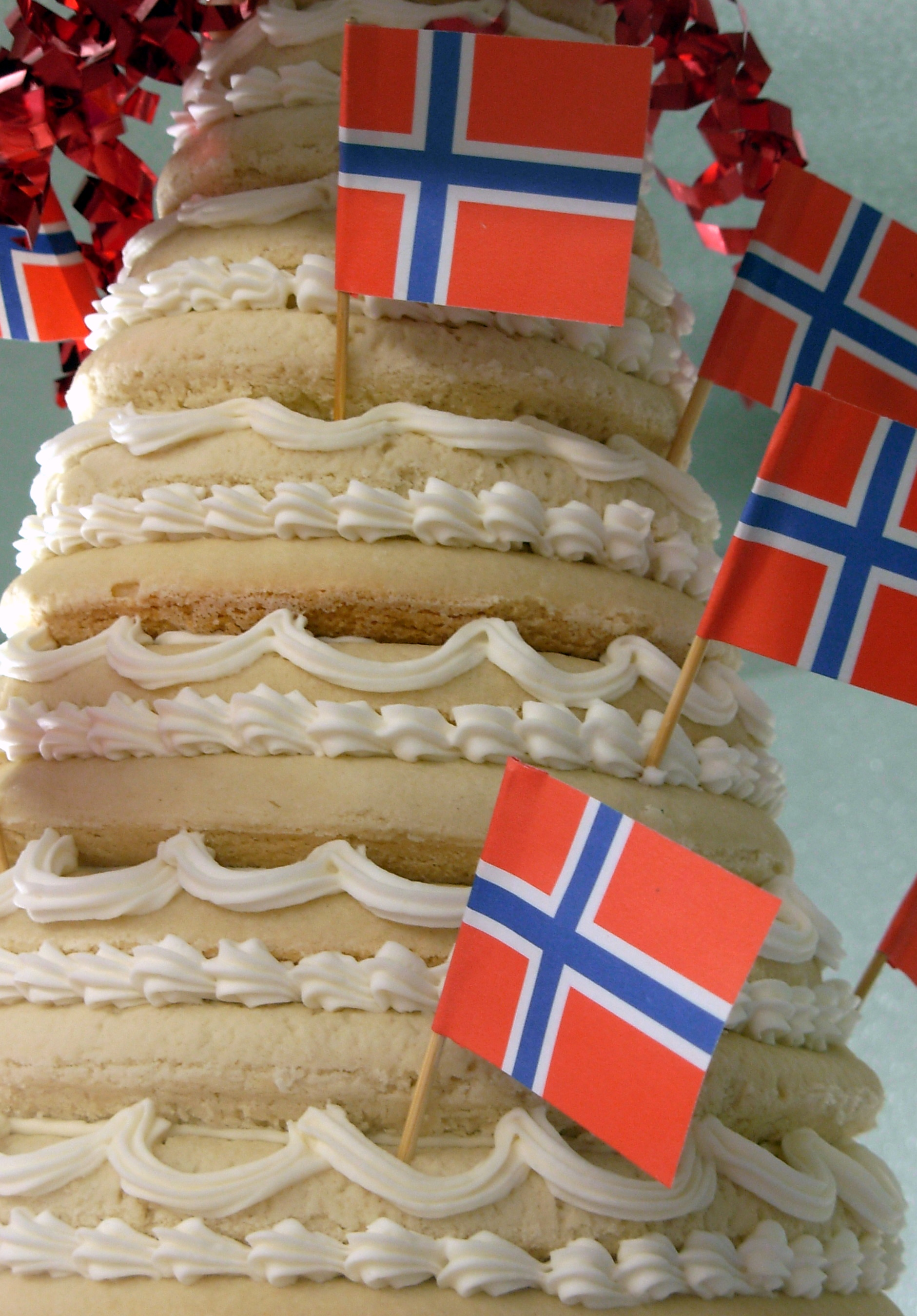
Closeup of a kransekake decorated with Norwegian flags

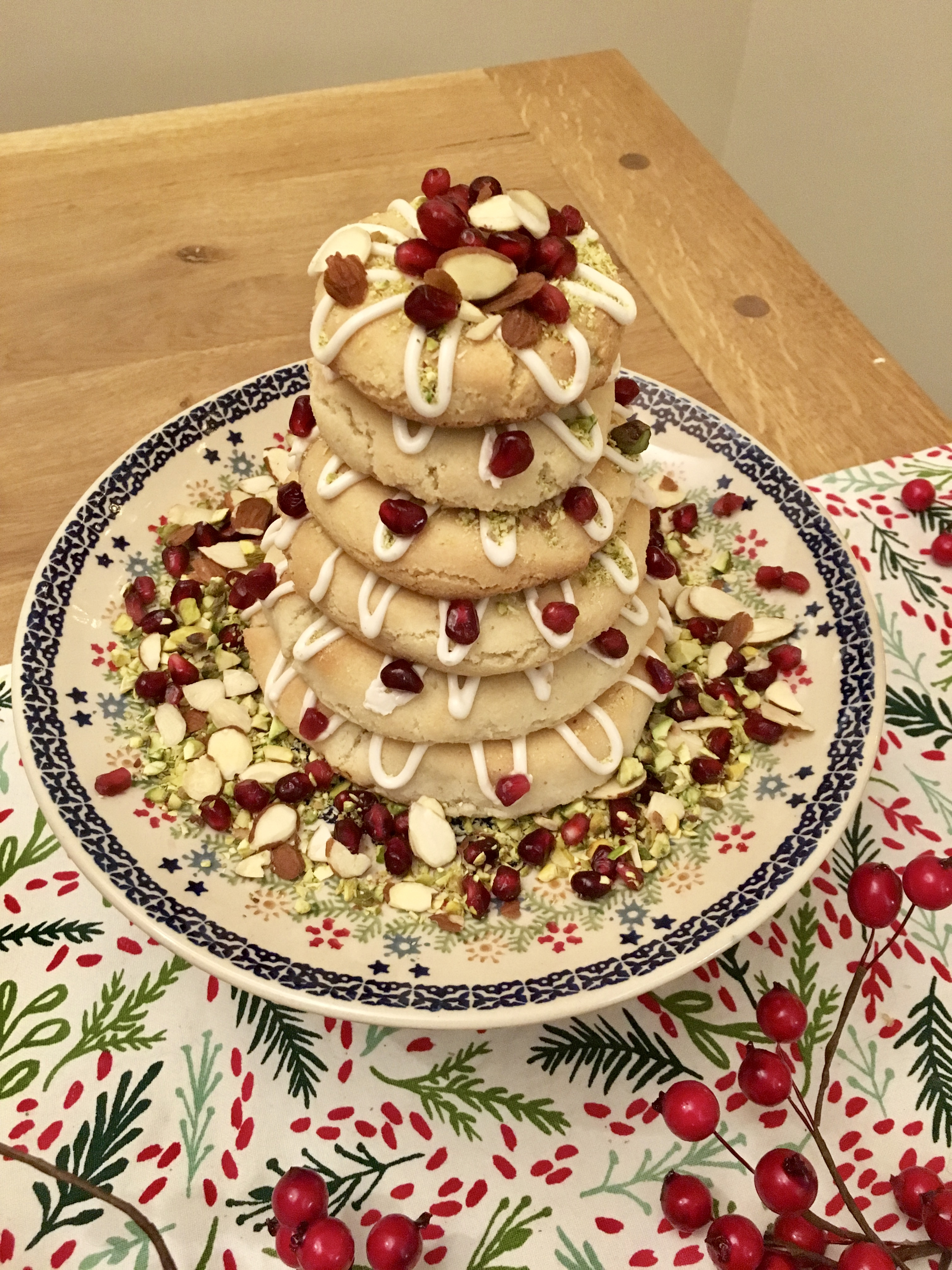
A small kransekake, decorated with nuts and fruit as well as the traditional white glaze

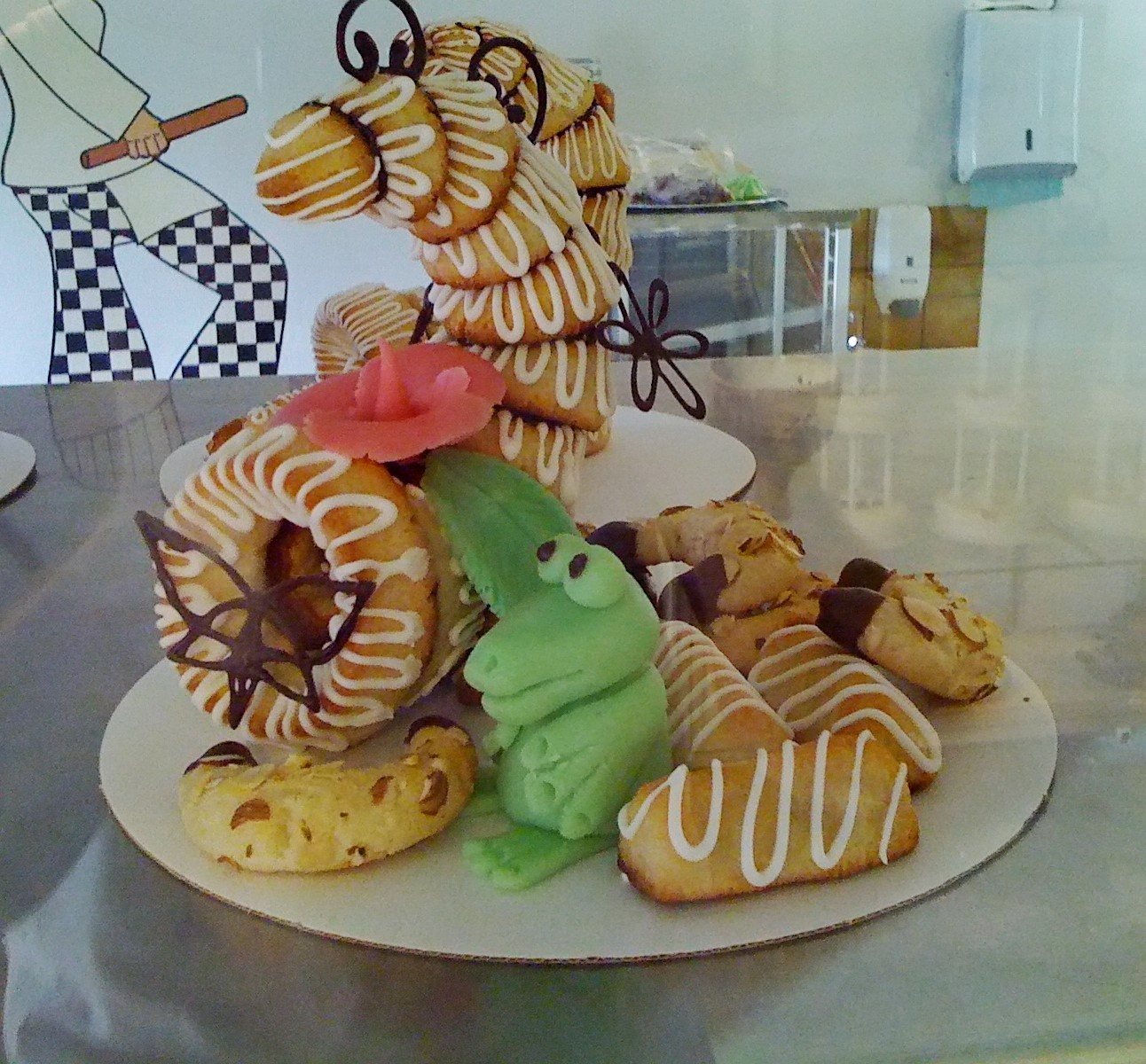
A modern, smaller version of overflødighedshorn decorated with marzipan and chocolate scrolls (Danish: Snirkel). On the lower right there are small, oblong pieces of kransekage.

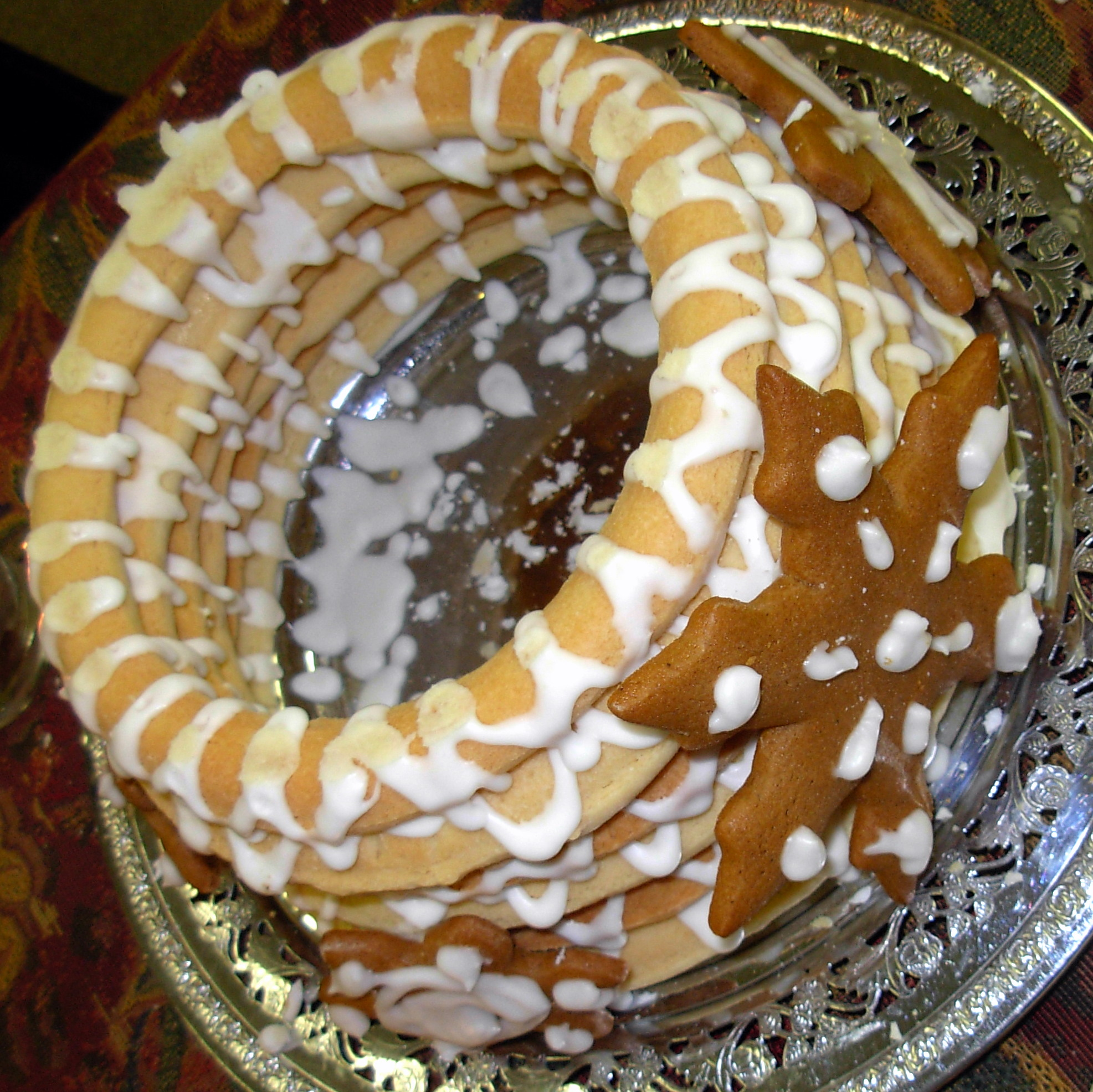
A kransekake ring decorated with gingerbread

== See also ==
- List of Norwegian desserts
- List of almond dishes
- Krokan – Swedish pastry that uses the same ingredients
