= Krokan =

Traditional Swedish dessert

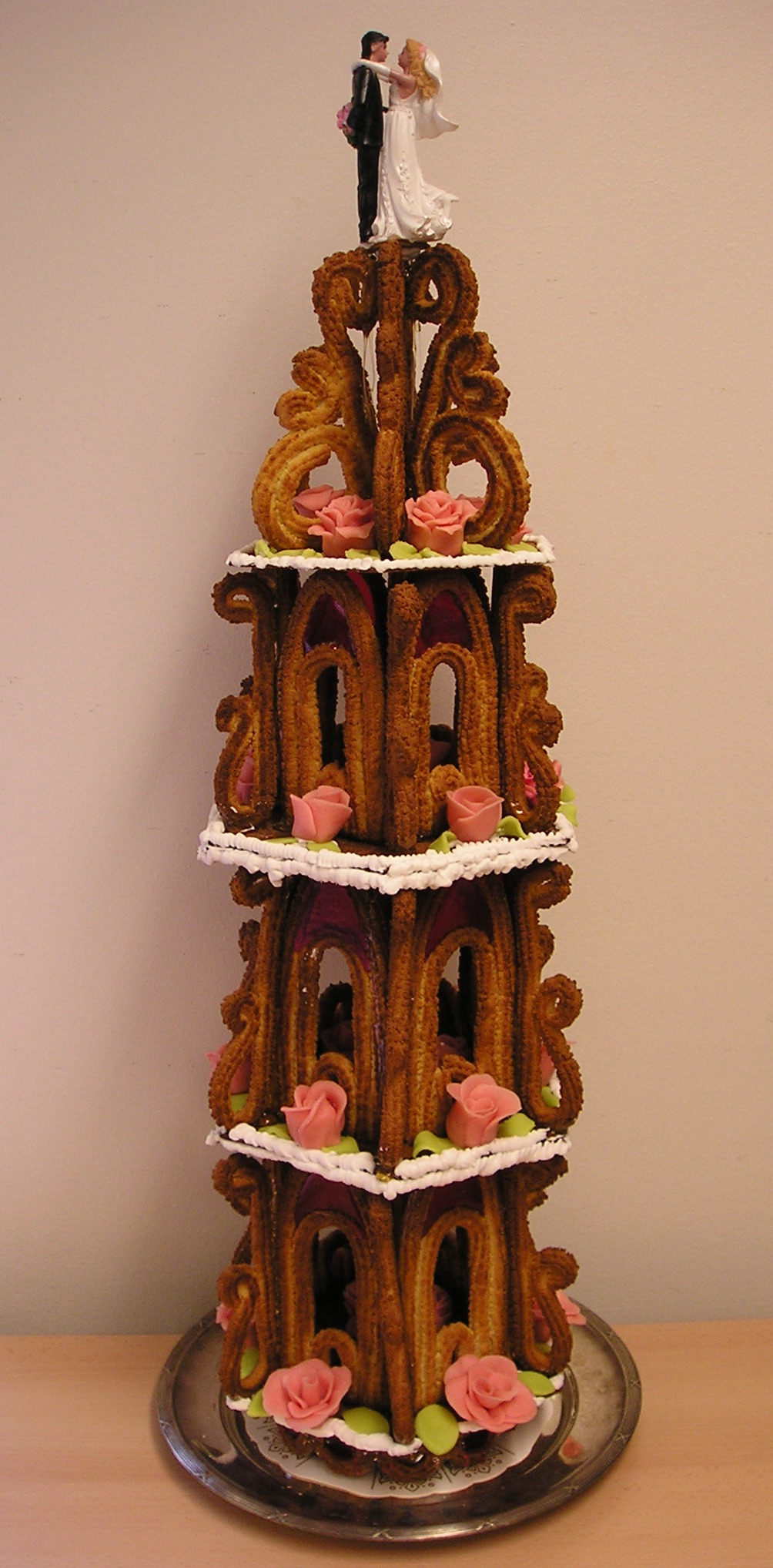
Example of a krokan

Krokan is a Swedish confection and a traditional dessert in the country. It is a multi-tiered pastry made from almond flour, constructed of thin pieces baked in decorative patterns. The parts are then joined using melted caramelized sugar, assembled into a tower, and decorated with crisscross patterns and marzipan roses.

Krokans are traditional at Swedish weddings, such as that of King Carl XVI Gustaf in 1976. Half a century before, a letter to The American-Scandinavian Foundation described the krokan as "a gorgeous cake made of almond and sugar and always quite as necessary to a Swedish wedding as the bride herself".

Krokan was the showstopper challenge in episode 9 of season 13 of The Great British Bake Off.

== See also ==
- Kransekage – Danish pastry that uses the same ingredients
