= Frangipane =

Almond custard

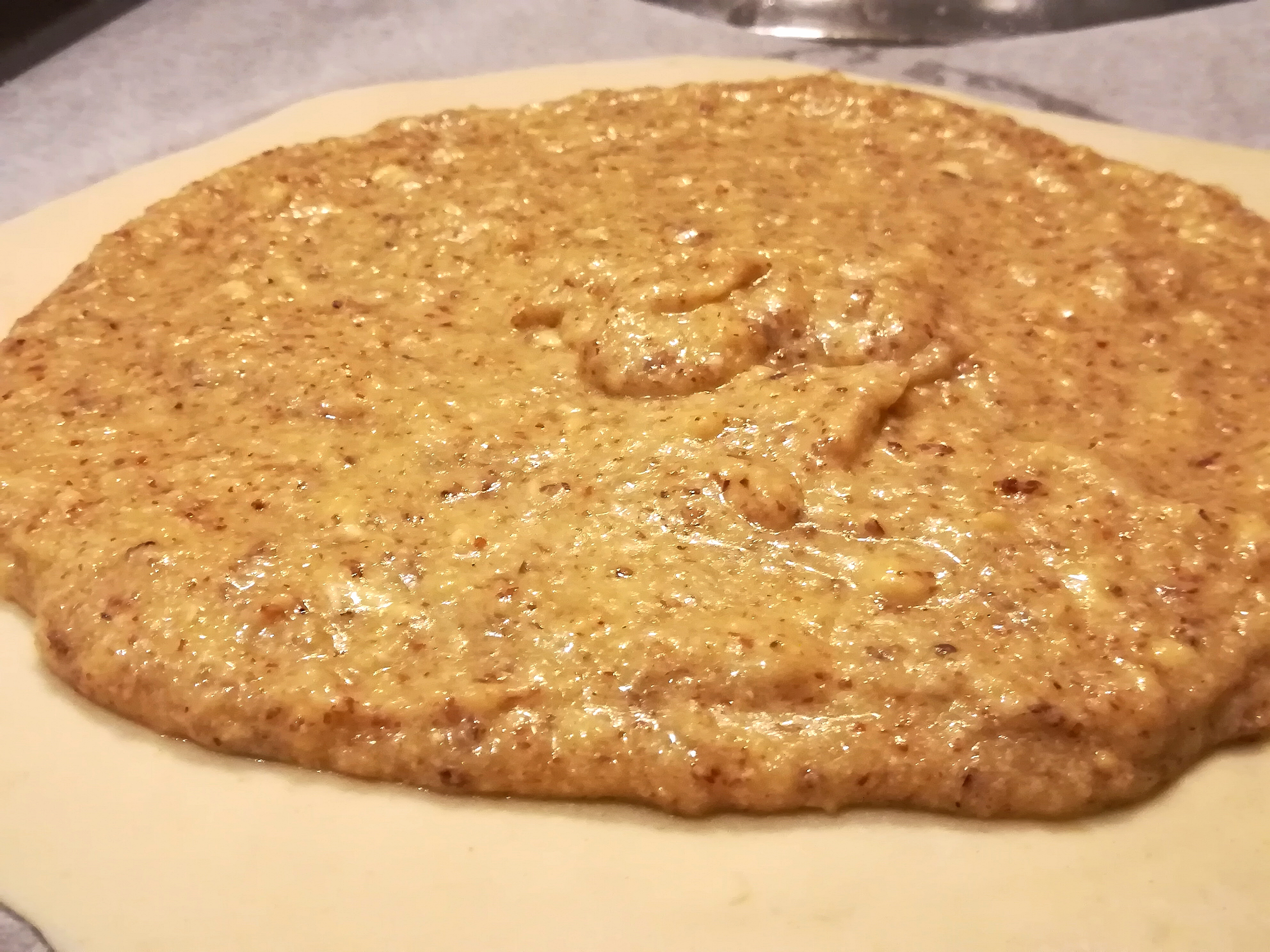
- Frangipane cream before baking
- Type: Custard
- Place of origin: France
- Main ingredients: Almonds or almond flavouring, butter, sugar, eggs

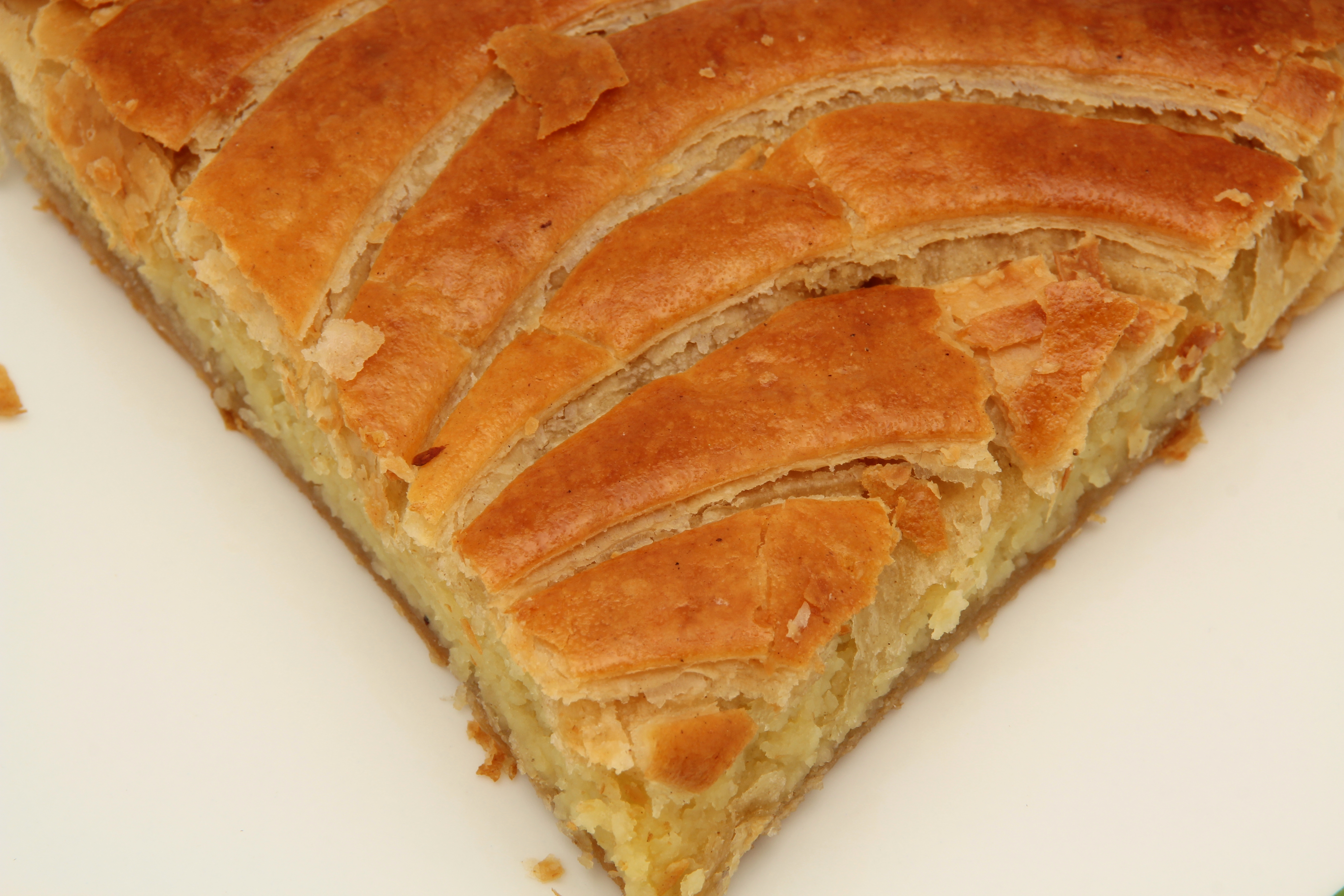
French galette des rois (kings' cake)

Frangipane (/ˈfrændʒɪpæn, -peɪn/ FRAN-jih-pa(y)n) is a sweet almond-flavoured cream typical in French patisserie. Frangipane is used in a variety of ways, including cakes and such pastries as the Bakewell tart, conversation tart, Jésuite, and galette des rois. The first written record was in a French cookbook from 1674, where it was spelt franchipane, and was described as a custard tart flavoured with pounded almonds and pistachios. However, food historian Claudine Brecourt-Villars, writing in 1996, says, in her view, frangipane meant cream. Alan Davidson, in his book The Oxford Companion to Food, called Frangipane an almond based mixture.

It is traditionally made by combining two parts of almond cream (crème d’amande) with one part pastry cream (crème pâtissière). Almond cream is made from butter, sugar, eggs, almond meal, bread flour, and rum; and pastry cream is made from whole milk, vanilla bean, cornstarch, sugar, egg yolks or whole eggs, and butter. There are many variations on both of these creams as well as on the proportion of almond cream to pastry cream in frangipane.

On Epiphany, the French cut the galette des rois – a round cake made of frangipane layers – into slices to be distributed by a child known as le petit roi (the little king), who is usually hiding under the dining table. The cake is decorated with stars, a crown, flowers and a special bean hidden inside the cake. Whoever gets the piece of the frangipane cake with the bean is crowned "king" or "queen" for the following year.

== Etymology ==
The word frangipane is a French term used to name products with an almond flavour. The word comes ultimately from the last name of Marquis Muzio Frangipani or Cesare Frangipani. The word first denoted the frangipani plant, from which was produced the perfume originally said to flavour frangipane. Other sources say that the name, as applied to the almond custard, was an homage by 16th-century Parisian chefs in name only to Frangipani, who created a jasmine-based perfume with a smell like the flowers to perfume leather gloves.

== See also ==
- List of almond dishes
- List of custard desserts
- List of pastries
- French cuisine
