= Finalists of The Great British Bake Off (series 1–7) =

The Great British Bake Off is a British television baking competition, produced by Love Productions. It premiered on BBC Two in 2010, then moved to BBC One in 2014, and then moved to Channel 4 in 2017. This list contains sections about annual winners and runners-up who appeared in the first seven series that aired on BBC.

The information seen in tables, including age and occupation, is based on the time of filming.

== Series 1 (2010) ==
Finalists of series one (2010)
Baker	Age (on show debut)	Occupation	Hometown	Result
Edward "Edd" Kimber	24	Debt collector for Yorkshire Bank	Bradford, West Yorkshire	Winner
Ruth Clemens	31	Retail manager/housewife	Poynton, Cheshire	Runner-up
Miranda Gore Browne	37	Food buyer for Marks & Spencer	Midhurst, West Sussex	Eliminated in final's 1st round

No baker was awarded Star Baker this season.

=== Edd Kimber (winner) ===
Edd Kimber (born 7 March 1985 in Bradford), the winner of the first series in 2010, had previously worked as a debt collector for a bank at the time of original airing. Since then, Kimber has written the following cookbooks: The Boy Who Bakes (2011; ISBN 978-0-85783-045-6), Say It with Cake (2012; ISBN 978-0857830975), Patisserie Made Simple (2014; ISBN 978-0857832436), One Tin Bakes (2020; ISBN 978-0-85783-859-9), One Tin Bakes Easy (2021; ISBN 978-0-85783-978-7), and Small Batch Bakes (2022; ISBN 978-1-914239-28-1). He was "resident baker" on The Alan Titchmarsh Show.

He came out while attending university. As of 2022, he was living in Highbury, north London, with his partner Mike.

=== Ruth Clemens ===
Ruth Clemens, runner-up of the first series, established her blog The Pink Whisk, which Kate Watson-Smyth of The Independent ranked 49th out of fifty "best food websites" of 2011.

=== Miranda Gore Browne ===
Miranda Gore Browne, eliminated in the finals of the first series, was a buyer of Marks & Spencer at the time of original airing. As of 2017, she is a consultant for the National Trust and ambassador for Aga Rangemaster Group. She also hosts baking classes in West Sussex. She wrote her cookbooks Biscuit (2012; ISBN 9780091945022) and Bake Me a Cake As Fast As You Can (2014; ISBN 9781446489178, 9780091945114). She also appeared in a video A Perfect Afternoon Tea (2014).

== Series 2 (2011) ==
Finalists of series two (2011)
Baker	Age (on show debut)	Occupation	Hometown	Star Baker (count and weeks)	Result
Joanne "Jo" Wheatley	41	Housewife	Ongar, Essex	1 (6th)	Winner
Holly Bell	31	Advertising executive	Leicester	2 (1st and 4th)	Runner-up
Mary-Anne Boermans	45	Housewife	Kidderminster, Worcestershire	None	Runner-up

There was no Star Baker on the seventh week as Paul and Mary felt singling out one baker when the results were incredibly close would not be right.

=== Jo Wheatley (winner) ===
Joanne Wheatley (née Rutland; born 27 May 1969), the winner of the second series, has started her own cookery school and written two cookbooks A Passion For Baking (2013; ISBN 9781780338774) and Home Baking (2014; ISBN 9781472109354). She has appeared in The One Show, performed cooking demonstrations on The Alan Titchmarsh Show and written a column in the Sainsbury's magazine. She writes for The Sun and various food publications.

Wheatley is married to Richard, who was sentenced on 20 April 2010 to seven years in prison for a £60-million money laundering scheme. They have three sons together.

=== Holly Bell ===
Holly Bell, one of runners-up of the second series, worked in an advertising industry at the time of original airing. She wrote her cookbook Recipes from a Normal Mum (2014; ISBN 978-1-84949-419-9)

=== Mary-Anne Boermans ===
Mary-Anne Boermans (born 1964/65), one of runners-up of the second series, had been a housewife at the time of original airing and previously played women's rugby for Wales. She wrote her cookbook Great British Bakes (2013; ISBN 9781448155019, 978-0-22-409556-3) and runs a blog Time to Cook.

== Series 3 (2012) ==
Finalists of series three (2012)
Baker	Age (on show debut)	Occupation	Hometown	Star Baker (count and weeks)	Result
John Whaite	22	Law student	Wigan	1 (2nd)	Winner
Brendan Lynch	63	Recruitment consultant	Sutton Coldfield	2 (4th and 6th)	Runner-up
James Morton	21	Medical student	Hillswick, Shetland Islands	3 (3rd, 8th and 9th)	Runner-up

There was no elimination in the sixth, week after John sustained a major injury to his finger and could not complete the last bake. The judges therefore determined that it would be unfair to eliminate anyone.

=== John Whaite (winner) ===
John Whaite (born 1988/89), winner of the third series, was a University of Manchester graduate student studying law at the time of the series. Whaite was raised in Wigan. He also has two older sisters. He attended the University of Oxford twice.

After Bake Off, Whaite graduated with a law degree. He then attended the London branch of Le Cordon Bleu.

In January 2016, Whaite established his eponymous cookery school, John Whaite's Kitchen Cookery School, a converted 400-year-old barn on his family's farm in Wrightington, Lancashire. He appeared in ITV's Lorraine, This Morning, What's Cooking?, The Alan Titchmarsh Show and Sunday Brunch. He also co-presented ITV's cooking competition series Chopping Block with Rosemary Shrager in 2016–17. He also regularly appeared as a guest of presenter Steph McGovern's Channel 4 talk show Steph's Packed Lunch.

Whaite announced his engagement with his partner Paul Atkins, a graphic designer, in July 2017.

In 2021, Whaite was a contestant on the nineteenth series of Strictly Come Dancing, appearing as part of the first ever male same-sex pairing with professional Johannes Radebe. Whaite and Radebe in December 2021 became one of two finalist pairs but then lost the contest to another pair, actress Rose Ayling-Ellis and dancer Giovanni Pernice, via public vote.

Whaite wrote the following cookbooks: John Whaite Bakes (2013), John Whaite Bakes at Home (2014), Perfect Plates in 5 Ingredients (2016), Comfort: Food to Soothe the Soul (2018), and A Flash in the Pan (2019).

=== Brendan Lynch ===
Brendan Lynch (born 1948/49), runner-up of the third series, was a semi-retired company director at the time of the series. Two years after Bake Off, in 2014, Lynch was treated in four months for his chronic ulcerative colitis, to which he attributed stress during the Bake Off filming and consumption of his own bakes. Since then, he consumed nutritional supplements and reduced use of sugar, lactose and gluten in order to control the condition.

Also, after Bake Off, Lynch taught cookery courses around the UK and baking skills to dementia-diagnosed people with classic recipes that they could remember from years ago, exhibited cooking/baking events at food festivals and cruises, and wrote recipes for British national newspapers. In early 2014, he was a judge at a local junior school's charity baking contest.

=== James Morton ===
James Morton (born 1990/91), runner-up of the third series, was a University of Glasgow medical student when he first competed. When originally aired, he became a fan favourite for "his relaxed, laid-back approach and love of experimentation". In the finals week, his Signature bake's bottom was "soggy", and he baked five cakes instead of only one as instructed for his Showstopper, both of which failed to impress the judges.

Morton graduated with a medical degree in March 2015, qualifying as a doctor. He also established his blog containing his recipes. He is the son of Tom Morton, a broadcaster.

Morton re-competed against Chetna Makan (series five), Howard Middleton (series four), and Janet Basu (series two) in the Boxing Day episode of The Great Christmas Bake Off 2016 special. Makan was crowned the episode's winner.

Morton wrote cookbooks, including Brilliant Bread (2013) and Shetland: Cooking on the Edge of the World (2018) with his father Tom as co-writer. His book Brilliant Bread won the Cookery Book of the Year Award at the 2014 Guild of Food Writers Awards. The 2018 critically-acclaimed book Shetland was criticised by some over what they perceived as a negative portrayal of Shetlanders, particularly a poem about fishing written by Morton.

Morton also wrote baking columns for a Scottish tabloid Sunday Mail.

== Series 4 (2013) ==
Finalists of series four (2013)
Baker	Age (on show debut)	Occupation	Hometown	Star Baker (count and weeks)	Result
Frances Quinn	31	Children's clothes designer	Market Harborough, Leicestershire	1 (7th)	Winner
Ruby Tandoh	20	History of Art and Philosophy student	Southend, Essex	3 (2nd, 6th and 8th)	Runner-up
Kimberley Wilson	30	Psychologist	London	2 (4th and 9th)	Runner-up

=== Frances Quinn (winner) ===
Frances Elizabeth Quinn (born 1981) is a British baker and children's clothing designer from Market Harborough who won the fourth series in 2013. Her first book release was Quinntessential Baking.

Quinn is an ambassador of the Cream Tea Society and is a frequent guest on UK radio and TV. She has appeared on the pages of Vogue, has baked for illustrator Quentin Blake, and has appeared on Pointless Celebrities with 2014 GBBO runner-up Richard Burr. Other clients include Jools Holland and Wimbledon Tennis Club.

On 5 February 2017, Quinn created a Jaffa Cake measuring 124 cm (4.07 ft) in diametres and 1.207 m^{2} (12.99 ft^{2}) of the surface area. The ingredients used included eggs, butter, caster sugar, self-raising flour, and vanilla. After proper baking, the base was topped with orange jelly disc and then coated in dark chocolate. The Cake was presented via a BBC Radio 4 series The Philosopher's Arms fifteen days later and has been deemed by the Guinness World Records the "largest jaffa cake" to this date.

Five months later on 14 July, Quinn created a jam-filled biscuit measuring 52.5 cm × 127.7 cm × 9.5 cm (20.7 in × 50.3 in × 3.7 in) (in width, length, and depth) and weighing 26.76 kg (59 lb 0 oz). The shape of the biscuit resembled a tennis racket, especially to celebrate that year's Wimbledon Championships. Among the ingredients were plain flour, icing sugar, egg yolk, butter, vanilla, salt, water, and strawberry jam. The biscuit was given away without charge at six Hambleton Bakery locations. The Guinness World Records has deemed it the "largest jam filled biscuit" to this date.

In May 2020, Quinn had been reportedly banned from Waitrose for shoplifting. An officer representing Leicestershire Police stated: "She admitted her involvement to officers and the matter was dealt with by way of a community resolution”.

In late May 2022, Quinn created another Jaffa Cake measuring 175 cm (69 in) in diametre, longer than the one recorded by the Guinness World Records, and weighing 80 kg (180 lb). Ingredients of this Cake included eggs, dark chocolate, and jelly. Its thorough baking duration was about eleven hours, which occurred at the High Wycombe, Buckinghamshire location of McVitie's. The Cake was then served to guests and crew of the fifteenth series of Britain's Got Talent at one of its semifinals rounds.

=== Ruby Tandoh ===
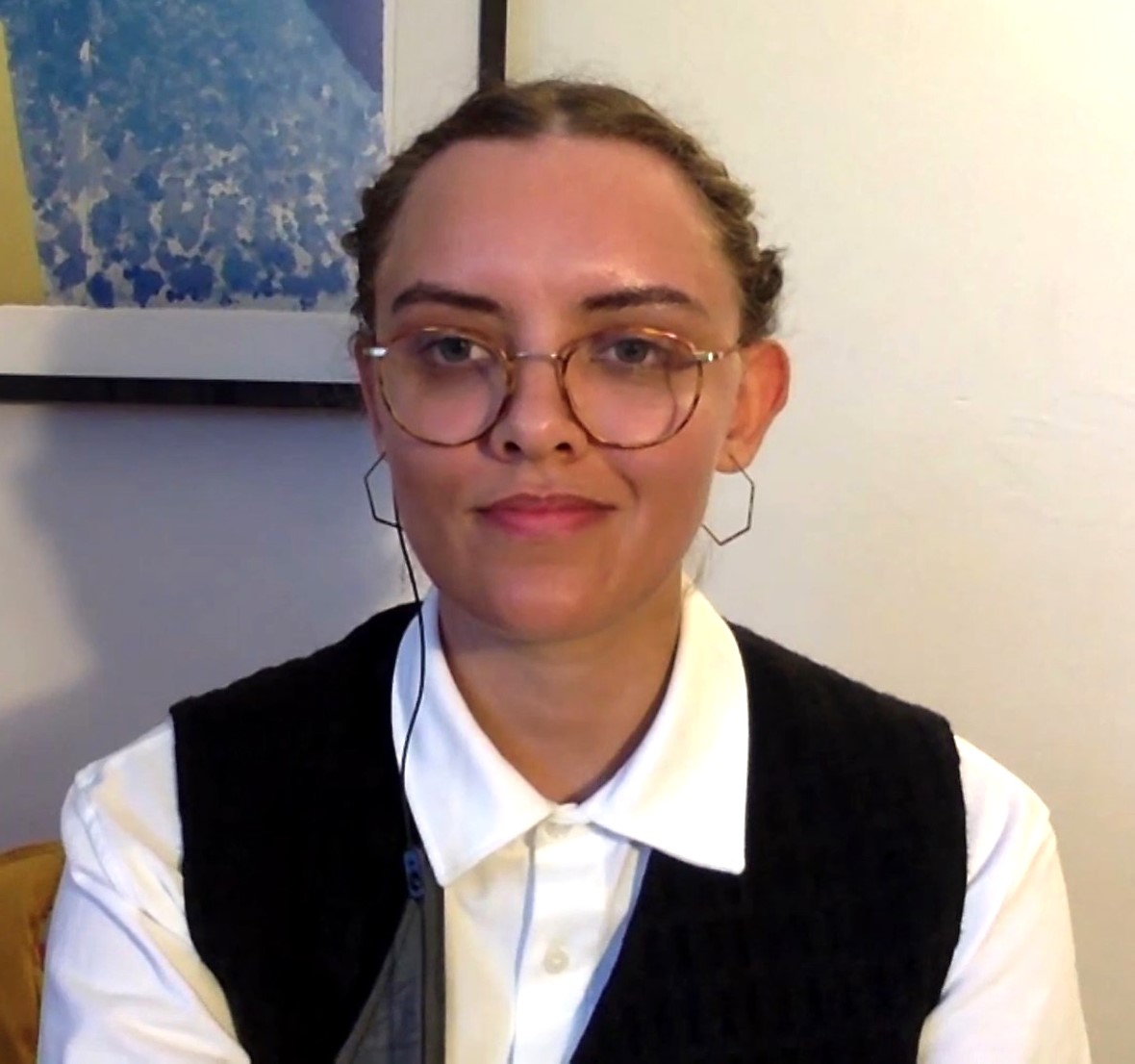
Ruby Tandoh in 2020

Ruby Tandoh (born 1991/92), runner-up of the fourth series, was a first-year University College London student, studying history and art at the time of filming. She was also a former model. Her grandfather came from Ghana. She grew up in Southend-on-Sea, Essex. Her mother is a school administrator; her father, a Royal Mail staff. She has three younger siblings.

Allegations arose regarding Paul Hollywood's favouritism toward Ruby Tandoh, resulting in personal attacks against Tandoh including by the chef Raymond Blanc. Both Hollywood and Tandoh denied the accusation. After Bake Off, Tandoh has written column articles for The Guardian, The New Yorker, Financial Times, and Vice.

Tandoh wrote cookbooks Crumb (2014; ISBN 0701189312), Flavour (2016; ISBN 0701189320), Eat Up! (2018; ISBN 1781259593), Breaking Eggs (2021), and Cook As You Are (2022). She also wrote an essay "Tikim Nang Tikim" for a collection book In the Kitchen (2020).

Tandoh admitted her many years of eating disorder in a 2016 interview. She also wrote a one-off magazine Do What You Want, whose profits went to charities, including ones tackling eating disorders.

Tandoh came out as bisexual in a 2018 interview with The Times. She married her partner Leah Pritchard in September 2018.

=== Kimberley Wilson ===
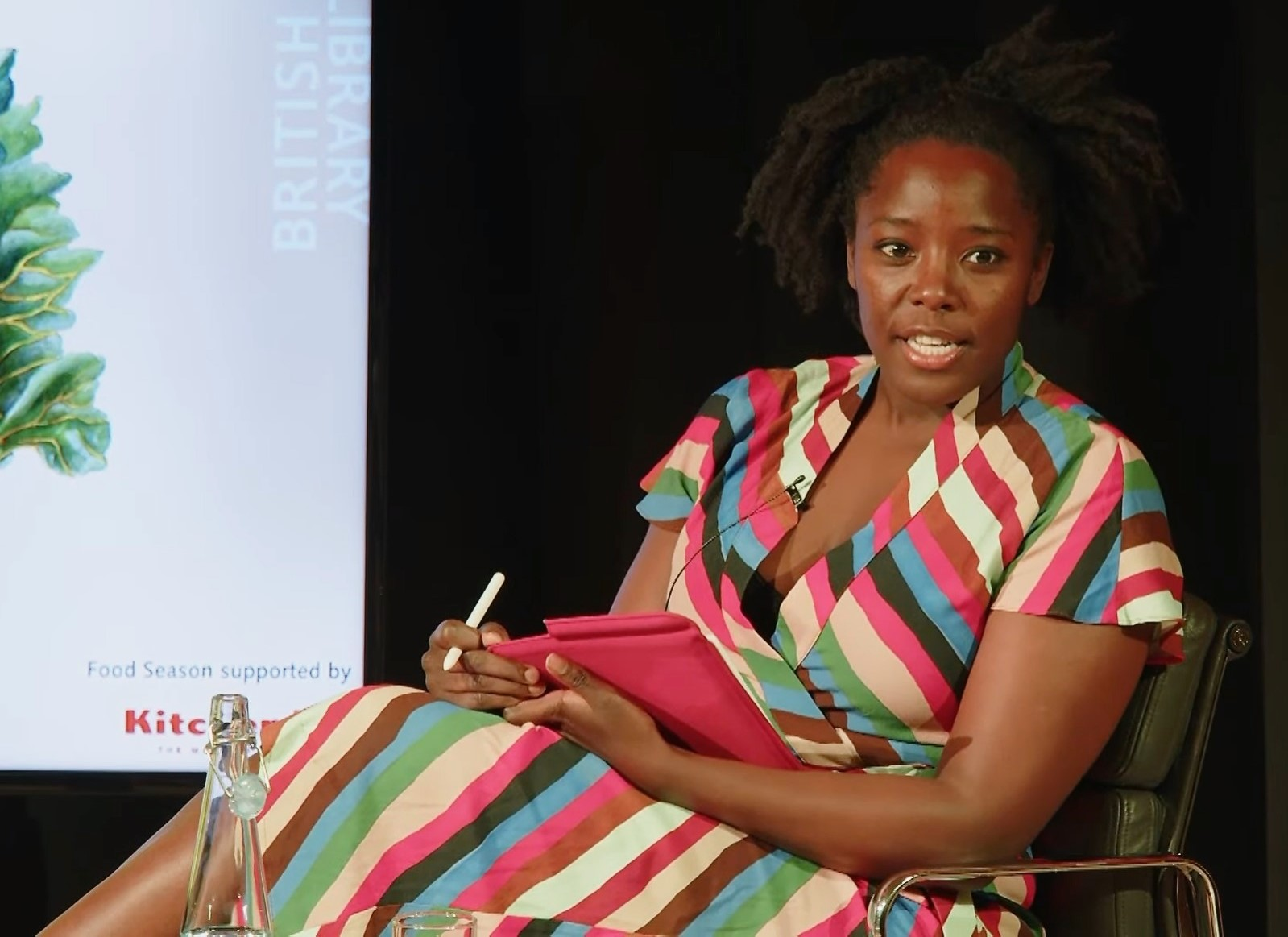
Wilson at the British Library in 2022

Kimberley Wilson (born 1982/83), runner-up of the fourth series, was a psychologist at the time of filming. Wilson was born when her mother was aged 22; Wilson's brother was born five years prior. Their single mother raised both Kimberley and her brother in East London.

After Bake Off, Wilson has run a private clinic in Central London and wrote a self-help book titled How to Build a Healthy Brain (2020), her first book. She hosts her own podcast Stronger Minds, which debuted in 2020. She and Xand van Tulleken co-host a BBC psychology-based podcast Made of Stronger Stuff, which debuted in 2021.

== Series 5 (2014) ==
Finalists of series five (2014)
Baker	Age (on show debut)	Occupation	Hometown	Star Baker (count and weeks)	Result
Nancy Birtwhistle	60	Retired practice manager	Barton-upon-Humber, Lincolnshire	1 (1st)	Winner
Richard Burr	38	Builder	Mill Hill, London	5 (2nd, 4th, 7th–9th)	Runner-up
Luis Troyano	42	Graphic designer	Poynton, Cheshire	1 (3rd)	Runner-up

Because the judges were unable to agree, no-one was eliminated in the sixth week.

=== Nancy Birtwhistle (winner) ===
Nancy Birtwhistle (born c. 1954) is a British baker who, in winning the fifth series in 2014 at the age of 60, became the oldest winner of The Great British Bake Off. Birtwhistle had applied to appear in the programme in 2013 but was unsuccessful.

Before taking baking up seriously, Birtwhistle was a Practice Manager at a GP surgery. She was born in Hull, lives in Barton-upon-Humber with her husband, Tim, and is a grandmother of eight.

Birtwhistle has contributed to national papers such as The Daily Telegraph, has her own website, gives baking demonstrations across the UK and has appeared on BBC's Morning Live and ITV's This Morning to demonstrate some of her eco living and cleaning tips.

Birtwhistle has released a number of books, focused on baking and eco-friendly living. In 2019, Birtwhistle released a self-published cookbook, Sizzle & Drizzle: Tips for a Modern Day Home-maker. She also wrote Clean & Green: 101 Hints and Tips for a More Eco-Friendly Home (2021), Green Living Made Easy: 101 Eco Tips, Hacks and Recipes to Save Time and Money (2022), The Green Gardening Handbook: Grow, Eat and Enjoy (2023), and The Green Budget Guide: 101 Planet and Money Saving Tips, Ideas and Recipes (2024). In 2024 Birtwhistle announced that she would release a second print of Sizzle and Drizzle with her current publisher in October of that year.

In 2024, Birtwhistle appeared on the CW show The Big Bakeover. In each episode she visits a struggling bakery and helps makeover the menu and premises alongside carpenter Erik Curtis

=== Richard Burr ===
Richard Burr (born 1975/76), one of runners-up of the fifth series, worked as a fourth-generation construction worker for his family building business, co-run by his father, at the time of the competition. At that same time, his mother worked as a bursar for a secondary school.

Burr attended Queen Elizabeth's School, Barnet, a boys' grammar school. When he was a teenager, he worked at a bakery in Mill Hill.

Burr graduated from Birkbeck, University of London in 2012 with his first-class honours degree in biodiversity and conservation. As of December 2019, he works in conservation.

Burr has a wife and three daughters.

Burr wrote BIY: Bake It Yourself, released on 27 August 2015.

=== Luis Troyano ===
Luis Troyano (late 1971 – late October 2020), one of the runners-up of the fifth series, owned a graphic design business at the time of competition. He was born in Stockport, England to his Spanish-born parents, Maria and Manuel, who emigrated to the United Kingdom in the 1960s. He began working daily for his father's Italian restaurant after school at age 12. His father Manuel died of cancer when Luis was 16.

After Bake Off, Troyano wrote a 2015 cookbook Bake It Great. He opened The Hive Bakery in Poynton, Cheshire in 2016.

In April 2019, Troyano had a cancer surgery, which he mentioned on Twitter. As confirmed by his agent on 5 November 2020 via Twitter, he died of esophageal cancer at age 48 on the week of 25 October 2020. Until his death, he was married to Louise, also a graphic designer.

== Series 6 (2015) ==
Finalists of series six (2015)
Baker	Age (on show debut)	Occupation	Hometown	Star Baker (count and weeks)	Result
Nadiya Hussain	30	Full-time mother	Leeds / Luton	3 (5th, 8th and 9th)	Winner
Ian Cumming	41	Travel photographer	Great Wilbraham, Cambridgeshire	3 (2nd–4th)	Runner-up
Tamal Ray	29	Trainee anaesthetist	Manchester	1 (7th)	Runner-up

=== Nadiya Hussain (winner) ===
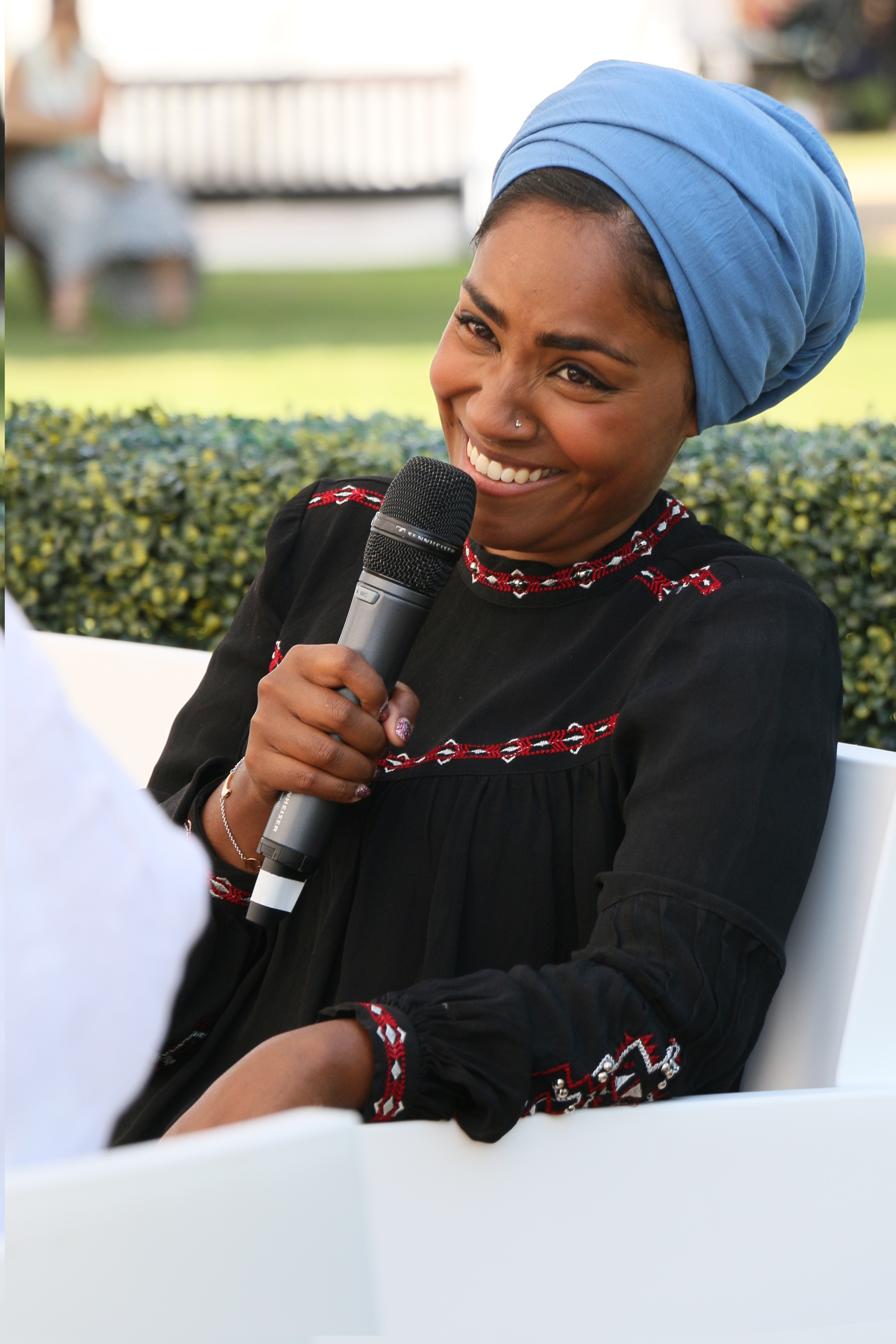
Hussain in 2019

Nadiya Jamir Hussain (née Begum; born 25 December 1984), the winner of the sixth series, was a full-time mother and housewife at the time of the competition. Also, at the time, she lived in Leeds with her husband Abdal—an IT specialist—and three children, and she studied for an Open University degree in Childhood and Youth Studies. Her appearance on the show and ensuing popularity with audiences were deemed important steps toward shifting stereotypes about the Muslim community and acceptance about cultural diversity.

Hussain is a second-generation British Bangladeshi, born and raised in Luton, Bedfordshire, where she attended Beech Hill Primary School, Challney High School and Luton Sixth Form College. She has five siblings: three sisters and two brothers. Her father, who originates from Beanibazar, was a chef and owned an Indian restaurant.

After Bake Off, the Hussains moved to Milton Keynes, nearer to London, in order for Nadiya to pursue a culinary career. Nadiya also worked as a contributing editor of BBC Good Food. She also wrote her debut cookbook Nadiya's Kitchen (2016); children's books Nadiya's Bake Me A Story (2016) and Nadiya's Bake Me a Festive Story (2017), both of which also contains recipes; her novel The Secret Lives of the Amir Sisters (2017); and her autobiography Finding My Voice (2019).

Hussain appeared in her television shows The Chronicles of Nadiya (2016), Nadiya's British Food Adventure (2017), Nadiya's Family Favourites (2018), Time to Eat (2019), Nadiya Bakes (2020), and Nadiya's Fast Flavours (2021). She also appeared as one of judges for the fourth series of Junior Bake Off on CBBC.

In 2016, Hussain baked the official cake for Queen Elizabeth's 90th birthday. She was appointed Member of the Order of the British Empire (MBE) in the 2020 New Year Honours for services to broadcasting and the culinary arts.

=== Ian Cumming ===
Ian Cumming (born 1972/73), one of runners-up of the sixth series, has been a travel photographer since the 1990s. Cumming's pictures appeared in various publications like National Geographic and British Airways ad campaigns. His father was an engineer.

Cumming lives in Cambridgeshire with his wife, who is a doctor, and two children (one daughter and one son).

=== Tamal Ray ===
Tamal Ray (born 1985/86), one of runners-up of the sixth series, was a trainee anaesthetist at the time of the competition. His parents emigrated from India to the United Kingdom in the 1970s. Ray moved to Manchester with his parents while attending the Haberdashers' Aske's Boys' School (Habs). He graduated from the Habs in 2004, and then from King's College London with a bachelor's degree in Medicine.

After Bake Off, Ray appeared in one of January 2016 episodes of BBC's This Week supporting junior doctors' strike amidst government negotiations over pay and working conditions. He also appeared in a one-episode medical programme Be Your Own Doctor (2016) with co-host Kate Quilton. He also has written columns and published his recipes for The Guardian.

Ray re-competed for the 2018–19 New Year's special against other previous contestants Candice Brown (series seven, winner), Kate Henry (series five), and Steven Carter-Bailey (series eight). Carter-Bailey was crowned the winner of that special. He and another Bake Off contestant Kim-Joy of the ninth series attended the finale screening of the first series (2019) of RuPaul's Drag Race UK.

Ray publicly came out as gay in autumn 2015.

== Series 7 (2016) ==
Finalists of series seven (2016)
Baker	Age (on show debut)	Occupation	Hometown	Star Baker (count and weeks)	Result
Candice Brown	31	PE teacher	Barton-Le-Clay, Bedfordshire	3 (2nd, 5th and 8th)	Winner
Jane Beedle	61	Garden designer	Beckenham	1 (1st)	Runner-up
Andrew Smyth	25	Aerospace engineer	Derby / Holywood, County Down	2 (7th and 9th)	Runner-up

=== Candice Brown (winner) ===
Candice Brown (born 21 December 1984), the winner of the seventh series, was a PE teacher at Ashlyns School at the time of the competition. In her victory speech, she attributed her success to starting baking at four years old.

Brown graduated from the University of Birmingham with a Bachelor's degree in teaching. As reported in November 2016, after Bake Off, she left her job as a PE teacher at Ashlyns School, Berkhamsted in order to pursue a career in baking.

She wrote the cookbooks Comfort: Delicious Bakes and Family Treats (2017; ISBN 1785037072) and Happy Cooking (2021; ISBN 9781529108330).

Brown occasionally cooks on the ITV daytime programme This Morning. She took part in the tenth series of Dancing on Ice on ITV in 2018, in which she was partnered with Matt Evers. In 2019 she appeared in The Great New Year's Bake Off and on Celebrity Mastermind, which she won having taken Audrey Hepburn as her specialist subject.

In 2018, Brown worked for a short time in the pub kitchen run by Tom Kerridge, before taking up the lease, with her brother Ben, of the Green Man pub in Eversholt, Bedfordshire.

In June 2020, Brown announced her split from her husband Liam Macauley, whom she married in 2018.

=== Jane Beedle ===
Jane Beedle (born 1954/55), one of runners-up of the seventh series, is a garden designer. Her company has worked on London gardens, including ones in Bromley. Beedle's grandfather owned a bakery in Hastings. She has a younger brother. She also has a husband with a son and a daughter.

Beedle re-competed against Andrew Smyth (series seven), Liam Charles (series eight), and Flo Atkins (series eight) in the 2018 Christmas special of Bake Off. She was crowned the special's winner.

=== Andrew Smyth ===
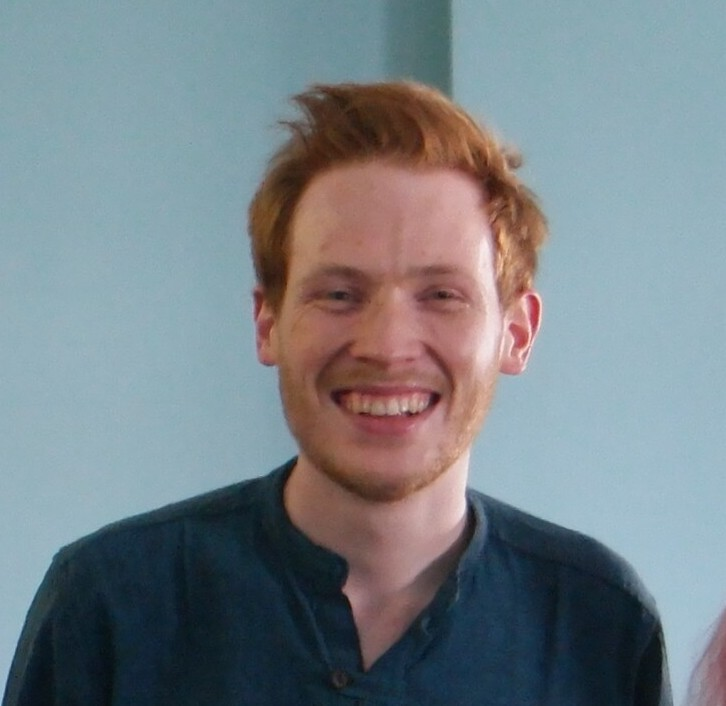
Smyth in 2019

Andrew Michael Smyth (born 1990/91), one of runners-up of the seventh series, is an aerospace engineer for Rolls-Royce Holdings in Derby, designing jet engines. He was born in County Down, Northern Ireland, to his parents Nigel and Kay and has one brother, Jamie. He sings tenor especially for a choir group in Derby.

Smyth graduated from Sidney Sussex College, Cambridge in 2013 with a degree in Engineering.

Smyth re-competed against Jane Beedle (series seven), Liam Charles (series eight), and Flo Atkins (series eight) in the 2018 Christmas special of Bake Off. Beedle was crowned the special's winner.

In 2021, Smyth was one of the executive producers of a Netflix baking competition series called Baking Impossible. He also served as a judge on the show.

== See also ==
- List of The Great British Bake Off contestants
