= The Great British Bake Off series 7 =

Seventh series of The Great British Bake Off

The Great British Bake Off
- Series 7
- Presented by: Mel Giedroyc; Sue Perkins
- Judges: Mary Berry; Paul Hollywood
- No. of contestants: 12
- Winner: Candice Brown
- Runners-up: Andrew Smyth; Jane Beedle
- Location: Welford Park, Berkshire
- No. of max. bakes: 30
- No. of episodes: 10

Release
- Original network: BBC One
- Original release: 24 August – 26 October 2016

Series chronology
- ← Previous; Series 6 Next → Series 8

The seventh series of The Great British Bake Off aired from 24 August 2016, with twelve contestants competing to be crowned the series 7 winner.

This series was the last to be broadcast on BBC One, as the production company Love Productions opted to move the show to Channel 4. As such, it was also the last series to feature Sue Perkins, Mel Giedroyc, and Mary Berry.

In the United States, the seventh series was broadcast as the fourth season on PBS and streamed as Collection 4 on Netflix.

Sue Perkins does not appear in episode 2. When the episode was being filmed in April 2016 she needed time off to deal with a bereavement. She does appear vocally in the narration.

== Bakers ==
| Contestant | Age | Hometown | Occupation | Finish | Place |
|---|---|---|---|---|---|
| Lee Banfield | 67 | Bolton, England | Pastor | Episode 1 | 12th |
| Louise Williams | 46 | Cardiff, Wales | Hairdresser | Episode 2 | 11th |
| Michael Georgiou | 20 | Durham, England | Student | Episode 3 | 10th |
| Kate Barmby | 37 | Brooke, England | Nurse | Episode 4 | 9th |
| Valerie "Val" Stones | 66 | Yeovil, England | Semi-retired, Substitute teacher | Episode 5 | 8th |
| Rav Bansal | 28 | Erith, England | Student support | Episode 6 | 7th |
| Tom Gilliford | 26 | Rochdale, England | Project engagement manager | Episode 7 | 6th |
| Benjamina Ebuehi | 23 | South London, England | Teaching assistant | Episode 8 | 5th |
| Selasi Gbormittah | 30 | London, England | Client service associate | Episode 9 | 4th |
| Andrew Smyth | 25 | Holywood, Northern Ireland | Aerospace engineer | Episode 10 | Runner-up |
| Jane Beedle | 61 | Beckenham, England | Garden designer | Episode 10 | Runner-up |
| Candice Brown | 31 | Barton-Le-Clay, England | PE teacher | Episode 10 | 1st |

== Results summary ==
This series was won by Candice Brown, with Andrew Smyth and Jane Beedle finishing as runners-up.

Elimination chart
| Baker | 1 | 2 | 3 | 4 | 5 | 6 | 7 | 8 | 9 | 10 |
|---|---|---|---|---|---|---|---|---|---|---|
| Candice | LOW | SB | LOW | SAFE | SB | HIGH | SAFE | SB | HIGH | WINNER |
| Andrew | SAFE | HIGH | HIGH | HIGH | SAFE | LOW | SB | SAFE | SB | Runner-up |
| Jane | SB | SAFE | SAFE | SAFE | HIGH | SAFE | SAFE | HIGH | LOW | Runner-up |
| Selasi | HIGH | SAFE | SAFE | SAFE | SAFE | HIGH | LOW | LOW | OUT | |
| Benjamina | HIGH | SAFE | SAFE | SB | SAFE | SAFE | HIGH | OUT | | |
| Tom | SAFE | SAFE | SB | LOW | LOW | SB | OUT | | | |
| Rav | SAFE | SAFE | SAFE | LOW | SAFE | OUT | | | | |
| Val | LOW | LOW | LOW | SAFE | OUT | | | | | |
| Kate | SAFE | SAFE | HIGH | OUT | | | | | | |
| Michael | SAFE | SAFE | OUT | | | | | | | |
| Louise | SAFE | OUT | | | | | | | | |
| Lee | OUT | | | | | | | | | |

Colour key:

Baker was one of the judges' least favourite bakers that week, but was not eliminated.
Baker was one of the judges' favourite bakers that week, but was not the Star Baker.
Baker got through to the next round.
Baker was eliminated.
Baker was the Star Baker.
Baker was a series runner-up.
Baker was the series winner.

== Episodes ==
Colour key:

Baker was eliminated at conclusion of episode
Baker was named "Star Baker" at conclusion of episode
Baker was named runner-up for the series
Baker won series

=== Episode 1: Cake ===
For the first challenge, the bakers were given 2 hours to make a drizzle cake, the brief being that the cake be moist and well permeated with the drizzle. For the technical challenge, the bakers were instructed to make Mary Berry's recipe for 12 jaffa cakes. The recipe used a whipped fatless sponge, orange jelly and tempered chocolate with a design of sorts. For the final challenge, the bakers were instructed to make a mirror glaze cake. The cake had to have a genoise sponge and have a very shiny, mirror-like top, covering the cake entirely, all in 3 hours.

| Baker | Signature (Drizzle Cake) | Technical (12 Jaffa Cakes) | Showstopper (Mirror Glaze Cake) | Result |
|---|---|---|---|---|
| Andrew | Lemon and Rosemary Drizzle Cake | 12th | 'Ultimate Indulgence' Mirror Glaze Cake | Safe |
| Benjamina | Pistachio, Cardamom and Lemon Drizzle Cake | 6th | White Chocolate Mirror Glaze with Salted Praline Buttercream | Safe |
| Candice | Raspberry and Rhubarb Drizzle Custard Bundt Cake | 5th | Mirror Mirror On The Wall, Who Is The Shiniest Cake Of Them All? | Safe |
| Jane | Lemon and Poppy Seed Drizzle Cake | 7th | Chocolate Orange Mirror Cake | Star Baker |
| Kate | Berry Best Apple and Bramble Drizzle Cake | 4th | One Swallow Does Not Make A Summer Cake | Safe |
| Lee | St. Clements Orange and Lemon Drizzle Cake | 11th | Strawberry Surprise Mirror Cake | Eliminated |
| Louise | Orange Liqueur and Lemonade Drizzle Cake | 9th | White Chocolate Trifle Mirror Glaze Cake | Safe |
| Michael | Lime, Ginger and Honey Drizzle Cake | 3rd | Matcha Tea Chocolate Mirror Glaze | Safe |
| Rav | Ginger Spice Yuzu Drizzle Cake | 8th | Colombian Mocha Mirror Glaze Cake | Safe |
| Selasi | Citrus and Spice Drizzle Cake | 1st | Raspberry, Sloe and White Chocolate Mirror Glaze Cake | Safe |
| Tom | G&T Drizzle Cake | 2nd | Black Forest Broken Mirror | Safe |
| Val | Mum's Orange and Lemon Drizzle | 10th | Chocolate Sponge with Four Fruit Frosting | Safe |

=== Episode 2: Biscuits ===
For the Signature Challenge, the bakers were given 2 1/2 hours to make 24 iced biscuits (cookies). The biscuits had to be crisp and uniform. 12Viennese Whirls were set as the technical challenge. To be completed in 1 1/2 hours, they had to be filled with buttercream and jam, and had have a defined shape. For the showstopper, a gingerbread scene was set as the challenge, the only brief being it that it had to be 30 cm (12 in) high, and contain eight characters or objects. The bakers had 4 hours for this challenge.

| Baker | Signature (24 Iced Biscuits) | Technical (12 Viennese Whirls) | Showstopper (Gingerbread 3D Scene) | Result |
|---|---|---|---|---|
| Andrew | Beehive Biscuits | 4th | Punting in Cambridge | Safe |
| Benjamina | Bouquet Biscuits | 3rd | New York, New York | Safe |
| Candice | Salted Caramel, Chocolate Iced Shiny Hearts | 8th | Gingerbread Pub with Sticky Ginger Carpet | Star Baker |
| Jane | Flower Pot Iced Biscuits | 2nd | Hastings Old Town Fishing Net Shops and Boat | Safe |
| Kate | "A Biscuit for the Broads" | 1st | "I Promise I will do my best" | Safe |
| Louise | Baa Bara Brith Biscuits | 10th | Gingerbread Wedding | Eliminated |
| Michael | Malt, Chocolate and Orange Iced "Beer" Biscuits | 9th | Trip to See Santa in Lapland | Safe |
| Rav | Union Jack Bunting Biscuits | 6th | Gingerbread Christmas Fairground | Safe |
| Selasi | "Wheelie Hot Iced Biscuits" | 11th | Stained Glass Window Gingerbread Church | Safe |
| Tom | Chai Frappelatteccino Biscuits | 7th | Tom and Pod's Near Death Experience | Safe |
| Val | Sunday Treat Iced Ice Cream Cone Biscuits | 5th | From Holland to New York via Yorkshire | Safe |

Host Sue Perkins did not appear in the episode.

=== Episode 3: Bread ===
For the bakers' first challenge, they had to make a chocolate loaf in 2 1/2 hours. The loaf had to contain chocolate in some form, whether it be cocoa powder or actual pieces of chocolate. For the technical challenge, the bakers were required to make 12 Dampfnudel, a recipe Paul Hollywood called "notoriously difficult". In 2 hours, the bakers had to make 12 steamed bread rolls with two types of sauce. A savoury plaited (braided) centrepiece was set as the showstopper, to be created using at least 3 different flours, in 4 hours.

| Baker | Signature (Chocolate Loaf) | Technical (12 Dampfnudel) | Showstopper (Savoury Plaited (Braided) Centrepiece) | Result |
|---|---|---|---|---|
| Andrew | Chocolate Barmbrack Bread | 2nd | Braided Harvest Bread Basket | Safe |
| Benjamina | Chocolate, Tahini and Almond Babka | 6th | Braided Bread Heart | Safe |
| Candice | Chocolate, Salted Caramel & Pecan Brittle Brioche Bread | 3rd | Italian Light and Dark Rye Twist | Safe |
| Jane | Chocolate and Cranberry Couronne | 9th | Chorizo and Chilli Flower with Parmesan and Pesto Centre | Safe |
| Kate | Cobbled Loaf | 8th | The Corn Maiden | Safe |
| Michael | Chocolate and Chilli Swirl Plait | 7th | Cypriot Dove and Olive Branch Plaited Loaf with Houmous | Eliminated |
| Rav | Chocolate, Cardamom and Hazelnut Loaf | 10th | Three Tier Diwali Bread Centrepiece | Safe |
| Selasi | Chocolate, Orange and Cinnamon Bread | 5th | Bedouin Escape Tear and Share Bread | Safe |
| Tom | Chocolate Orange and Chilli Swirl Bread | 4th | Jörmungandr and Mjölnir | Star Baker |
| Val | Double Chocolate Cinnamon Twist Loaf | 1st | "And They All Went Into The Ark To Get Out Of The Rain" | Safe |

=== Episode 4: Batter ===
The first task was to make 24 yorkshire puddings in 2 hours. The bakers used the standard recipe filled with a variety of savory ingredients and flavors. The technical challenge gave the bakers 1 hour to make 12 heart-shaped "lace" pancakes, which required them to draw a heart-shaped design with the batter. They were only allowed 1 practice pancake. The showstopper challenge was to make 36 sweet churros in 3 hours.

| Baker | Signature (24 Filled Yorkshire Puddings) | Technical (12 Heart-Shaped Lace Pancakes) | Showstopper (36 Churros) | Result |
|---|---|---|---|---|
| Andrew | Yorkshire 'Tapas' Puddings | 4th | Churros Window Box | Safe |
| Benjamina | Red Onion Chutney, Brie and Bacon Yorkshire Puddings | 1st | Tropical Churros | Star Baker |
| Candice | Yorkshire Wellingtons | 2nd | Two-Way Peanut Butter Churros | Safe |
| Jane | Meat and Two Veg Yorkshires | 3rd | Pistachio and White Chocolate Churros | Safe |
| Kate | Christmas Dinner Compromise | 7th | Hot Cross Bunny Churros | Eliminated |
| Rav | Thai Tofu Panang Yorkshires | 9th | Three Dip Matcha Pistachio Churros | Safe |
| Selasi | Perfect Sunday Roast Accompaniment | 8th | Lemon and Anise Churros | Safe |
| Tom | West Yorkshire Fusion Puddings | 5th | Fennel Churros Snake In The Grass | Safe |
| Val | Mum's Chilli Yorkshire Puddings | 6th | Orange Chocolate Churros | Safe |

=== Episode 5: Pastry ===
For the signature bake, bakers were tasked with baking 24 breakfast pastries, using 2 different batches of dough (total 12 each) in 3 1/2 hours. The technical challenge required the bakers to make a feathered Bakewell tart in 2 1/2 hours. For the showstopper challenge, the bakers were challenged to make 48 filled filo amuse-bouche; 24 with a savoury filling and 24 with a sweet filling, in 4 hours.

| Baker | Signature (24 Breakfast Pastries) | Technical (Bakewell Tart) | Showstopper (48 Filo Amuse-Bouche) | Result |
|---|---|---|---|---|
| Andrew | Mum and Dad's Breakfast Pastries | 6th | Spicy Chorizo Squash Parcels; Baklava Bites | Safe |
| Benjamina | 'Good Morning America' Swirls; Peanut Butter and Banana Pinwheels | 5th | Plantain and Spinach Samosas; Chai Pear Cups | Safe |
| Candice | Danish Pastry Croque Monsieur Kites; Cinnamon Apple, Vanilla Crème Rose Danish | 2nd | Sausage, Black Pudding and Apple Rounds; Banoffee Whiskey Cups | Star Baker |
| Jane | Orange Pain au Raisin; Raspberry, Chocolate and Almond Danish | 1st | Roquefort, Fig and Walnut Parcels; Cherry and Chocolate Cones | Safe |
| Rav | Cinnamon Swirls; Pecan, Walnut and Maple Plaits | 8th | Chinese Style Prawn Filo Tartlets; Spiced White Chocolate and Hazelnut Samosas | Safe |
| Selasi | Rhubarb, Mango and Ginger Plait; Pineapple and Coconut Pinwheels | 3rd | Parma Ham, Asparagus and Cheese Filo Cigars; Coffee Cream Filo Cups | Safe |
| Tom | Mega Breakfast Bonanzas (Granola Spirals and Wheat Foldovers) | 4th | Yin and Yang Amuse-bouche | Safe |
| Val | Pecan and Maple Syrup Pinwheels; Apple, Sultana and Cinnamon Swirls | 7th | Caramelised Red Onion, Goats Cheese Tartlets; Mincemeat and Apple Spiced Parcels | Eliminated |

=== Episode 6: Botanical ===
In the signature, the 7 remaining bakers were asked to create a meringue pie containing citrus fruit, such as orange, grapefruits and lemons, in 2 hours. In the technical, the contestants had to create 2 leaf-shaped herb fougasses in 2 hours. In the showstopper, the contestants were asked to create a three-tier cake with a flower theme. All the tiers could be the same flavour, or each with a different flavour, and the cakes could be decorated with flowers, all to be done in 4 hours.

| Baker | Signature (Citrus Meringue Pie) | Technical (2 Herb Fougasse) | Showstopper (Three-Tier Flower Cake) | Result |
|---|---|---|---|---|
| Andrew | Tangy Lime and Ginger Meringue Pie | 6th | Spring Elderflower Trio | Safe |
| Benjamina | Grapefruit and Ginger Meringue Pie | 2nd | Floral Tea Cake | Safe |
| Candice | Lime, Coconut and Lemongrass Sugar Meringue Pie | 5th | Four Seasons Cake | Safe |
| Jane | Lime and Coconut Meringue Pie | 4th | Three Tier Orange Cake with a Floral Chocolate Collar | Safe |
| Rav | Mandarin Margarita Meringue Pie | 3rd | Blossom Cake | Eliminated |
| Selasi | Grapefruit, Orange and Mint Meringue Pie | 7th | Three Tiered Ombré Floral Cake | Safe |
| Tom | Blood Orange Halloween Pumpkin Pie | 1st | Floral Tea Cake | Star Baker |

=== Episode 7: Desserts ===
The Signature challenge required the bakers to make a family-sized roulade in 1 1/2 hours. The judges were looking for a light sponge cake, even layers of filling, and a clean swirl. The technical challenge gave the bakes 3 hours to make a marjolaine, an unusual layered cake made with meringue, decorated with ganache and nuts. The showstopper challenge allocated 4 hours for the bakers to make 24 mini mousse cakes with 2 flavours (12 of each).

| Baker | Signature (Family-Sized Roulade) | Technical (Marjolaine) | Showstopper (24 Mini Mousse Cakes) | Result |
|---|---|---|---|---|
| Andrew | Tropical Holiday Roulade | 1st | Childhood Ice Cream Mousse Cakes | Star Baker |
| Benjamina | Piña Colada Roulade | 3rd | Apple Crumble Mousse Cake; Chocolate Coffee Mousse Cake | Safe |
| Candice | Crowd Pleaser Roulade | 2nd | Blackberry and Raspberry Bubbles; After Dinner Mousse | Safe |
| Jane | Chocolate and Hazelnut Roulade | 4th | Chocolate, Coffee, and Vanilla Joconde Cakes; Blackcurrant and Vanilla Ombré Mousses | Safe |
| Selasi | Summer Picnic Roulade | 6th | Lemon, Raspberry and Passionfruit and Chocolate and Mint Mini Mousse Cakes | Safe |
| Tom | Millionaire's Roulade | 5th | Hipster Picnic | Eliminated |

=== Episode 8: Tudor (Quarterfinals) ===
Week eight featured the show's first Tudor theme, featuring food common in the 16th century. During the signature challenge, the 5 remaining bakers were asked to bake a shaped pie with Tudor flavours in 3 hours. The pie could be any type of pastry and they could use whichever fillings they wanted. In the technical, the contestants were asked to produce 12 jumbles—6 knot balls and 6 Celtic knots—in 1 1/2 hours. In the showstopper challenge, the contestants were asked to bake a marchpane (marzipan) cake in a three-dimensional shape in 3 1/2 hours. However, all of the cakes had to be Tudor-themed.

| Baker | Signature (Shaped Savoury Pies) | Technical (12 Jumbles) | Showstopper (3D Marchpane Cake) | Result |
|---|---|---|---|---|
| Andrew | Da Vinci Inspired Geared Pies | 2nd | Jousting Knights Marchpane | Safe |
| Benjamina | Mexican Adventure | 4th | Tudor Garden | Eliminated |
| Candice | Cheesy Cheeky Fish Pies | 1st | Peacock | Star Baker |
| Jane | Tudor Rose Pies | 5th | Swans | Safe |
| Selasi | Bouquet of Flowers | 3rd | Fruity Tudor Marchpane | Safe |

=== Episode 9: Pâtisserie (Semi-final) ===
The first task for pâtisserie week required the remaining 4 contestants to bake 24 palmiers, with 2 different savoury fillings and shapes, in 3 hours. The technical challenge was to make a Savarin, a liqueur-soaked yeast cake, which none of the contestants had made before, in 2 1/2 hours. The final challenge was to make 36 fondant fancies in 4 1/2 hours.

| Baker | Signature (24 Savoury Palmiers) | Technical (Savarin) | Showstopper (36 Fondant Fancies) | Result |
|---|---|---|---|---|
| Andrew | Cheesy Elephant Ears; Herby Treble Clefs | 2nd | Philharmonic Fondants | Star Baker |
| Candice | Red Onion, Cambozola and Walnut Palmiers; Mushroom, Streaky Bacon, and Parmesan Palmiers | 3rd | Chocolate Praline Fondant Fancies; Cherry Bakewell Fondant Fancies | Safe |
| Jane | Pesto and Sundried Tomato Palmiers; Goats Cheese, Olive and Parma Ham Palmiers | 1st | Pistachio and Raspberry Fondant Fancies; Lemon Curd Surprise Fondant Fancies | Safe |
| Selasi | Sundried Tomato, Onion, Peppers and Parmesan Palmiers; Salmon, Spinach and Mushroom Palmiers | 4th | Lime and Ginger Fondant Fancies; Pink Velvet and Raspberry Prosecco Fondant Fancies | Eliminated |

=== Episode 10: Royal Picnic (Final) ===
In the final signature challenge, the bakers had to make a filled meringue crown, which had to contain at least three layers of meringue, in 3 hours. In the technical, the judges decided to make a familiar bake challenging: the bakers had to make a Victoria sandwich, with no recipe or method given, in 1 1/2 hours. The final showstopper involved the largest number of bakes ever requested in a challenge. The bakers were given 5 hours to make a picnic fit for the Queen, including 1 chocolate celebration cake, 12 sausage rolls, 12 mini quiches, 12 savoury scones and 12 fruit and custard tarts.

| Baker | Signature (Meringue Crowns) | Technical (Victoria Sandwich) | Showstopper (Picnics) | Result |
|---|---|---|---|---|
| Andrew | Crunchy Caramel Cassis Crown | 1st | Family and Friends' Favourites Picnic | Runner-up |
| Candice | Queen Victoria's Mango and Strawberry Crown | 2nd | Picnic for Pearly Kings and Queens | Winner |
| Jane | Red, White and Blue Meringue Crown | 3rd | Family Favourites Feast | Runner-up |

== Christmas specials ==
The Masterclass episodes were replaced by two Christmas specials, which featured eight contestants from the series 2–5. The two Christmas specials were the last to be aired on BBC before the channel move, and thus featured the last appearances of hosts Mel Giedroyc and Sue Perkins and judge Mary Berry. Judge Paul Hollywood then followed the channel move.

The first Christmas special featured Mary-Anne Boermans (Series 2), Cathryn Dresser (Series 3), Ali Imdad (Series 4) and Norman Calder (Series 5). The competition was won by Mary-Anne Boermans. The second Christmas special featured Janet Basu (Series 2), James Morton (Series 3), Howard Middleton (Series 4) and Chetna Makan (Series 5). The competition was won by Chetna Makan.

=== Episode 1 ===
The signature challenge required the bakers to create 2 batches of edible Christmas tree decorations, 12 of each type, using biscuits in 2 hours. The technical challenge, set by Mary, tasked the bakers to make a choux wreath consisting of 36 choux buns, filled and decorated festively with chocolate in 2 hours. For the showstopper challenge, the bakers were required to make a Christmas scene cake, with at least three tiers, in four hours.

| Baker | Signature (24 Edible Biscuit Tree Decorations) | Technical (Choux Wreath) | Showstopper (Christmas Scene Cake) | Result |
|---|---|---|---|---|
| Ali | Rose & Fennel Henna-Inspired Biscuits Date & Orange Ma'amoul Bauble Biscuits | 1st | Celebration of Jesus Cake | Runner-up |
| Cathryn | Chocolate Peppermint Candy Canes Clementine, Cranberry & Rosemary Holly Leaf Biscuits | 2nd | Our Christmas Eve | Runner-up |
| Mary-Anne | Christmas Pudding and Christmas Wreath Biscuits | 3rd | My Christmas Cakey Bakey | Winner |
| Norman | Orange & Cinnamon Dufrickies Whisky Shortbread Ding Dangs | 4th | Gâteau De Joyeux Noël | Runner-up |

=== Episode 2 ===
The bakers were tasked to make 24 savoury Christmas canapés, 12 of two types in the signature challenge, in 2^{1}/_{2} hours. The technical challenge was set by Paul, in which the bakers were tasked of baking a Kanellängd, a spiced Scandinavian celebratory Christmas loaf with the meaning of "cinnamon length", in 2 hours. For the showstopper challenge, the bakers were required to make 36 sweet Christmas miniatures, 12 each of three types, arranged as a celebratory centerpiece, in 4^{1}/_{2} hours.

| Baker | Signature (24 Savoury Christmas Canapés) | Technical (Kanellängd) | Showstopper (36 Sweet Christmas Miniatures) | Result |
|---|---|---|---|---|
| Chetna | Aubergine & Tomato Canapés Spiced Potato Canapés | 3rd | Family Favourites | Winner |
| Howard | Smoked Trout Trees with Pea Pastry Partridge & Pear Treats | 2nd | Camp as Christmas Trio | Runner-up |
| James | Mackerel Mousse Mille-feuille Red Onion & Goats Cheese Swirls | 1st | Merry Extravaganza | Runner-up |
| Janet | Crab Pâté Gougère Barguettes Mushroom & Chicken Liver Tartlets | 4th | Festive Friends | Runner-up |

== Controversies ==
Before the series had begun, some viewers complained of the "gendered" icing in preview pictures of the bakers. In the promo shots of the bakers, the male bakers were given blue icing while the female bakers were given pink icing, whereas the previous year, every baker was given the same colour regardless. As a result, the BBC altered the colouring of the icing.

== Post-show career ==
Candice Brown was an occasional cook on ITV's This Morning. She appeared as a contestant on series 10 of Dancing on Ice in 2018. as well as on The Great New Year's Bake Off and Celebrity Mastermind which she won. She runs a pub, Green Man, in Eversholt, Bedfordshire. She has written a cookbook Comfort: delicious bakes and family treats released in 2017.

Andrew Smyth has appeared on Lorraine on ITV, Christmas Kitchen on BBC One. He baked a cake as a rotating jet engine for Prince William when he visited the Rolls-Royce factory in Derby where Smyth worked.

Several bakers participated in The Great Christmas Bake Off and The Great New Year's Bake Off in the following years. In 2017, Selasi Gbormittah and Val Stones participated in The Great Christmas Bake Off while Rav Bansal and Benjamina Ebuehi participated in The Great New Year's Bake Off with Bansal winning the special's star baker title. In 2018, Jane Beedle and Andrew Smyth participated in The Great Christmas Bake Off with Beedle winning the special's star baker title, while Candice Brown participated in The Great New Year's Bake Off.

== Ratings ==
The opening episode had an average viewing figure of 10.4 million according to overnight ratings, an improvement over the figure of 9.3 million for the corresponding episode in 2015. This made it the most watched TV show of 2016 so far, with the official figure also making it the most watched TV show since the 2015 Bake Off Final. Its run on the BBC ended with an average overnight viewing figure of 14 million for the final, peaking at 14.8 million, which is a record for the show. The series dominated the list of most-watched programmes in 2016, with nine of the top ten being episodes of the show. Its finale was watched by 15.9 million viewers (7 days cumulative figure), which makes it the most-watched TV shows in the UK in four years since the closing ceremony of the London Olympics in 2012, and the most-watched TV show of the year.

Official episode viewing figures are from BARB.

| Episode no. | Airdate | 7 day viewers (millions) | 28 day viewers (millions) | BBC One weekly ranking | Weekly ranking all channels | BBC iPlayer requests |
|---|---|---|---|---|---|---|
| 1 | 24 August 2016 | 13.58 | 13.86 | 1 | | 1,989,000 |
| 2 | 31 August 2016 | 13.45 | 13.74 | 1 | | 1,949,000 |
| 3 | 7 September 2016 | 13.01 | 13.38 | 1 | | 2,314,000 |
| 4 | 14 September 2016 | 13.29 | 13.88 | 1 | | 2,291,000 |
| 5 | 21 September 2016 | 13.12 | 13.33 | 1 | | 1,984,000 |
| 6 | 28 September 2016 | 13.13 | 13.41 | 1 | | 1,397,000 |
| 7 | 5 October 2016 | 13.45 | 13.72 | 1 | | 2,154,000 |
| 8 | 12 October 2016 | 13.26 | 13.45 | 1 | | 1,957,000 |
| 9 | 19 October 2016 | 13.44 | 13.65 | 1 | | 1,901,000 |
| 10 | 26 October 2016 | 15.90 | 16.03 | 1 | | 1,602,000 |

=== Specials ===
The Great British Bake Off, Class of 2015
| Episode no. | Airdate | 7 day viewers (millions) | 28 day viewers (millions) | BBC One weekly ranking | BBC iPlayer requests |
|---|---|---|---|---|---|
| | 27 October 2016 | 4.28 | 4.45 | 25 | —N/a |

The Great Christmas Bake Off
| Episode no. | Airdate | 7 day viewers (millions) | 28 day viewers (millions) | BBC One weekly ranking | BBC iPlayer requests |
|---|---|---|---|---|---|
| | 25 December 2016 | 8.21 | 8.35 | 4 | 853,000 |
| | 26 December 2016 | 6.37 | 6.52 | 15 | —N/a |
