= James Morton (baker) =

Scottish baker

- Born: 26 May 1991 (age 34); Inverness, Scotland
- Education: University of Glasgow
- Occupations: Author, baker, doctor
- Years active: 2012–present
- Known for: The Great British Bake Off; Brilliant Bread
- Parent: Tom Morton

James Patrick Bowie Morton (born 26 May 1991) is a Scottish doctor, baker, author and reality television contestant, based in Glasgow, who rose to fame when he became the runner up on the third series of The Great British Bake Off.

== Early life ==
James Morton was born in Inverness, Scotland, but from the age of three grew up in the Shetland Islands. He was introduced to baking by his maternal grandmother, who taught him after school each day. He is the son of journalist and former Radio Scotland radio presenter Tom Morton.

== The Great British Bake Off ==
In the first Summer of his medical degree at the University of Glasgow, Morton worked washing dishes at a small Glasgow deli. A keen bread baker already, here he was exposed to the wide variation of bread production and results. From then on, he studied baking as a science rather than a craft, often preferring to read peer-review cereal journals than cookbooks. He watched the second series of The Great British Bake Off in 2011 and applied for the series after pressure from his university friends.

When the third series originally aired, Morton became a fan favourite for "his relaxed, laid-back approach and love of experimentation". In the finals week, his Signature bake's bottom was "soggy", and he baked five cakes instead of only one as instructed for his Showstopper. His finale performance overall failed to impress the judges, making him one of two runners-up to crowned winner John Whaite.

Morton participated in the Bake Off's 2016 Xmas Special show, leading for much of the show but losing out to Chetna Makan after a series of errors in the showstopper round.

== Post-Bake Off baking activities ==
Morton has amassed a large following on Twitter and Instagram and founded a popular baking blog. He wrote a regular column in the "7 Days" supplement of the Sunday Mail newspaper from 2013 to 2018. He regularly composes comment and recipes for a wide variety of online and print publications. He has been a guest celebrity on numerous television shows, including Sunday Brunch and Big Fat Quiz of the Year. In October 2013, he was a guest presenter on RBS: Finding Scotland's Real Heroes and has toured Scotland with his bread demonstration shows "James Morton Kneads to Raise Some Dough" and "James Morton’s Stollen Christmas", taking them to large festivals such as Dundee Flower and Food Festival and the Edinburgh Festival Fringe.

He released his first book, Brilliant Bread, in August 2013, published by Ebury Publishing. It received a nomination for the best cookbook at the 2013 André Simon Awards and winning the Guild of Food Writers Award 2014 for best cookbook. His second book, How Baking Works (and what to do when it doesn't), was released on 12 March 2015. In 2019, he wrote another book on baking Super Sourdough.

Morton also wrote books outside of baking. Brew: The Foolproof Guide to Making World-Class Beer at Home was published in 2016. His home brews won national awards: his Oatmeal Extra Pale being brewed by Dark Star Brewing Company in 2014 and Skeleton Blues by Stewart Brewing in 2015.

In 2019, he co-wrote Shetland: Cooking on the Edge of the World with his father, Tom Morton. This book about the food and life on the Scottish islands he grew up in received critical acclaim, being shortlisted for the Andre Simon Food Book 2019, the Edward Stanford Travel Food & Drink Book 2019 and the Fortnum and Mason Cookery Book 2019. However, the book was criticised by the some over what they perceived as a negative portrayal of some islanders.

== Medicine ==
Besides baking, Morton graduated from the University of Glasgow with a degree in medicine and began work as a junior doctor in the NHS.

== Books ==
- Brilliant Bread (2013) ISBN 978-0-09-195560-1.
- How Baking Works (and what to do when it doesn't) (2015) ISBN 978-1-4735-0310-6.
- Brew: The Foolproof Guide to Making World-Class Beer at Home (2016) ISBN 978-1-78713-161-3.
- Shetland: Cooking on the Edge of the World (2018) ISBN 978-1-78713-306-8.
- Super Sourdough (2019) ISBN 978-1-78713-466-9.
- Sourdough: From Scratch (2021)
- Brew: From Scratch (2021)
- The Big Book of Bread: Recipes and Stories from Around the Globe (2024) ISBN 978-1-78713-874-2.
