= The Great British Bake Off series 2 =

Second series of The Great British Bake Off

The Great British Bake Off
- Series 2
- Presented by: Mel Giedroyc; Sue Perkins
- Judges: Mary Berry; Paul Hollywood
- Winner: Jo Wheatley
- Runners-up: Holly Bell; Mary-Anne Boermans
- Location: Valentines Mansion, Redbridge
- No. of max. bakes: 24
- No. of episodes: 8

Release
- Original network: BBC Two
- Original release: 16 August – 4 October 2011

Series chronology
- ← Previous; Series 1 Next → Series 3

The second series of The Great British Bake Off started 16 August 2011 with twelve amateur bakers. Unlike series one, the competition was held in a single location – the grounds of Valentines Mansion, a 17th-century mansion house in Redbridge. In addition to their on-screen presenting, Mel Giedroyc and Sue Perkins also took over the narration, which had been done by Stephen Noonan for the previous series. Series two also introduced the "star baker" award for the most impressive performer each week.

Three and a half thousand people applied for the competition, and twelve were selected. Each episode was filmed over two fourteen-hour days. The competition was won by Jo Wheatley.

== Bakers ==
Contestant	Age	Hometown	Occupation	Finish	Place
Keith Batsford	31	Arlesey	House husband	Episode 1	12th
Simon Blackwell	31	Norfolk	Rugby Coach	Episode 2	11th
Ian Vallance	40	Dunstable	Fundraiser for English Heritage	Episode 3	9th (tie)
Urvashi Roe	40	Enfield	Head of Marketing	Episode 3	9th (tie)
Ben Frazer	31	Northampton	Graphic Designer	Episode 4	8th
Jason White	19	Croydon	Civil Engineering Student	Episode 5	6th (tie)
Robert Billington	25	London	Photographer	Episode 5	6th (tie)
Yasmin Limbert	43	West Kirby	Childminder	Episode 6	5th
Janet Basu	63	Formby	Teacher of Modern Languages	Episode 7	4th
Holly Bell	31	Leicester	Advertising executive	Episode 8	Runner-up
Mary-Anne Boermans	45	Kidderminster	Housewife	Episode 8	Runner-up
Joanne "Jo" Wheatley	41	Ongar	Housewife	Episode 8	1st

== Results summary ==
Elimination chart
Baker	1	2	3	4	5	6	7	8
Jo	HIGH	LOW	SAFE	SAFE	SAFE	SB	HIGH	WINNER
Holly	SB	SAFE	SAFE	SB	SAFE	LOW	HIGH	Runner-up
Mary-Anne	SAFE	SAFE	HIGH	HIGH	HIGH	HIGH	LOW	Runner-up
Janet	SAFE	SAFE	LOW	SAFE	SB	HIGH	OUT	
Yasmin	SAFE	SAFE	SB	LOW	LOW	OUT		
Jason	SAFE	SB	SAFE	SB	OUT			
Robert	LOW	LOW	LOW	SAFE	OUT			
Ben	SAFE	SAFE	SAFE	OUT				
Ian	SAFE	HIGH	OUT					
Urvashi	SAFE	SAFE	OUT					
Simon	LOW	OUT						
Keith	OUT							

^{[1]} There was no Star Baker this week, as Paul and Mary felt it wouldn't be right to single out one baker when the results were incredibly close.

Colour key:

Baker got through to the next round.
Baker was eliminated.
Baker was one of the judges' least favourite bakers that week, but was not eliminated.
Baker was the Star Baker.
Baker was one of the judges' favourite bakers that week, but did not win star baker.
Baker was the series runner-up.
Baker was the series winner.

== Episodes ==
=== Episode 1: Cakes ===
For their first challenge, the bakers were asked to bake 24 cupcakes in 2 hours. They were allowed to make two different types of cupcakes. For the technical challenge, the bakers were asked to bake a Coffee and Walnut Battenburg cake using Mary Berry's recipe in 2 hours. The cake needed to have the perfect sponge which held its form (perfect symmetry), distinguish flavours, and a smooth exterior. For the showstopper, the bakers were asked to bake a chocolate tiered celebration cake with elaborate, multi-layer design in 5 hours.

Baker	Signature (24 Cupcakes)	Technical (Coffee and Walnut Battenberg)	Showstopper (Chocolate Tiered Cake)	Result
Ben	Rhubarb and Custard Cupcakes; After Dinner Cupcakes	2nd	Vanilla Sponge with White Chocolate and Raspberry Buttercream	Safe
Holly	Cherry Bakewell Inspired Cupcakes; Ginger Cupcakes with Fig Truffle	1st	Novelty Farm Cake	Star Baker
Ian	Apple and Cinnamon Cupcakes	10th	UNKNOWN	Safe
Janet	Raspberry and Cream Cupcakes	8th	Chocolate Marble Cake with Dark and White Chocolate Truffles	Safe
Jason	Lemon Meringue Cupcakes; Apple and Cinnamon Cupcakes	6th	UNKNOWN	Safe
Jo	Chocolate Orange Cupcakes; Orange and Cardamom Cupcakes	11th	Chocolate and Strawberry Cake	Safe
Keith	Earl Grey Cupcakes	12th	Chocolate and Sour Cream Cake	Eliminated
Mary-Anne	Banoffee Cupcakes	4th	Chocolate and Raspberry Opera Cake	Safe
Robert	Blackberry and Vanilla Cupcakes with Liquorice Frosting	3rd	Genoise Layered Mousse Cake with Chocolate Ganache	Safe
Simon	Guinness and Chocolate Cupcakes	9th	Two Tiered Chocolate Courgette Cake	Safe
Urvashi	Cherry Blossom Cupcakes; Japanese Lime Cupcakes	7th	Orange Blossom Celebration Cake	Safe
Yasmin	Cardamom and Pomegranate Cupcakes; Lemon Meringue Cupcakes	5th	Three Tier Passion Cake	Safe

=== Episode 2: Tarts ===
For the signature bake, the bakers were asked to bake a savoury quiche in 2 hours. For the technical challenge, the bakers were asked to bake a Tarte au Citron using Mary Berry's recipe in 1 1/2 hours. For the showstopper, the bakers were asked to bake 24 mini sweet tartlets of two different flavour combinations.

Baker	Signature (Savoury Quiche)	Technical (Tarte au Citron)	Showstopper (24 Miniature Sweet Tarts)	Result
Ben	Chorizo, Pepper and Gruyere Quiche	1st	Lemon Meringue Tarts	Safe
Holly	Pesto Quiche	4th	Milk Chocolate and Pistachio Tarts; Trifle Tarts	Safe
Ian	Stilton, Spinach and New Potato Quiche with Paprika and Walnut Pastry	2nd	UNKNOWN	Safe
Janet	Quiche Printanière	8th	Red Fruit Tarts; Chocolate and Cherry Tarts	Safe
Jason	Salmon and Pak Choi Quiche	3rd	Mint Chocolate Tarts; Blueberry Bakewell Tarts	Star Baker
Jo	Caramelised Onion, Gruyere and Thyme Quiche	10th	Raspberry and Mascarpone Tarts with Lemon and Almond Pastry; Honey and Almond Tarts with Sweetcrust	Safe
Mary-Anne	Roasted Cauliflower, Cheese and Caramelised Onion Quiche	9th	Butterscotch Brulée Tarts in Pecan Pastry; Apple Rose Tarts	Safe
Robert	Smoked Bacon and Kale Quiche	5th	Chocolate, Fennel and Ginger Tarts; Creme Patisserie and Poached Pear Tarts in Almond Pastry	Safe
Simon	Smoked Haddock and Watercress Quiche	11th	Passion Fruit and Ricotta Tarts; Salted Chocolate, Stem Ginger and Mascarpone Cream Tarts	Eliminated
Urvashi	Crab, Coriander and Coconut Quiche	7th	Strawberry and Basil Tarts; Elderflower and Honeycomb Tarts	Safe
Yasmin	Smoked Haddock and Watercress Quiche	6th	Chocolate and Orange Tarts in Cinnamon-Orange Pastry; Blueberry and Hazelnut Tarts in Hazelnut Pastry	Safe

=== Episode 3: Bread ===
For their signature bake, the bakers were asked to bake a free form flavored loaf (not using a tin) in 3 1/4 hours. The technical challenge gave the bakers 3 1/2 hours to bake a Focaccia, using Paul Hollywood's recipe. The showstopper required the bakers to produce a 2 part display: a basket made of bread, then filled with 24 rolls, 12 sweet and 12 savory, in 5 hours.

Baker	Signature (Free Form Loaf)	Technical (Focaccia)	Showstopper (12 sweet and 12 savoury rolls)	Result
Ben	Walnut, Raisin and Rosemary Loaf	3rd	UNKNOWN	Safe
Holly	Picnic Loaf	6th	Stilton and Walnut Rolls	Safe
Ian	Courgette, Caerphilly Cheese and Thyme Loaf	10th	Walnut and Raisin Rolls; Cracked Wheat Logs	Eliminated
Janet	Zupfe Loaf with Gruyère Cheese	8th	Apple and Walnut Granary Rolls Red Onion Cottage Rolls	Safe
Jason	Cheese and Onion Tear and Share Loaf	7th	UNKNOWN	Safe
Jo	Stromboli Flavoured with Mozarella, Ham, and Picante Pepper	1st	Spiced Orange Rolls; Pumpkin Seed Rolls	Safe
Mary-Anne	Ploughman's Loaf	5th	Herb and Walnut Breads; Chocolate and Chilli Buns	Safe
Robert	Rye and Coriander Seed Loaf	4th	Blueberry Brioche Rolls; Lemon and Poppy Seed Rolls	Safe
Urvashi	Salt and Peppercorn Loaf	9th	Chilli and Halloumi Rolls; Lemon and Coriander Mini Loaves	Eliminated
Yasmin	Egyptian Dukkah Loaf with Mixed Spices	2nd	Pesto Bread; Sweet Coconut Rolls	Star Baker

In this episode, two bakers were eliminated rather than one baker.

=== Episode 4: Biscuits ===
For the signature bake, the bakers were given 1 1/2 hours to make 12 biscuits of their choice; the biscuits should not be too soft, too hard or too crumbly. The technical challenge gave the bakers 1 1/2 hours to bake 24 brandy snaps. For the showstopper, the bakers were asked to produce a macaron display, consisting of 120 macarons (60 pairs) in 3 different flavors; they had 5 hours to complete it.

Baker	Signature (12 Biscuits)	Technical (24 Brandy Snaps)	Showstopper (Macarons)	Result
Ben	Stem Ginger Nuts	5th	Chocolate and Almond Macarons; Pine Nut Macarons; Pistachio Macarons	Eliminated
Holly	Strawberry and Custard Melts	3rd	'Chocolate bars of my youth' (Caramel Macarons, Mint Chocolate Macarons and Chocolate Orange Macarons)	Star Baker
Janet	Christmas Marzipan Biscuits	4th	Raspberry Macarons; Blackcurrant Macarons; Almond Macarons	Safe
Jason	Lebkuchen	1st	Mocktail Macarons (Mojito, Cranberry Cooler, and Piña Colada)	Star Baker
Jo	Lavender Biscuits	8th	Blueberry Macarons; Coconut Macarons; Strawberry Macarons	Safe
Mary-Anne	Melting Moments	2nd	Blackcurrant and Mint Macarons; Gooseberry and Elderflower Macarons; Hazelnut Macarons	Safe
Robert	Chocolate and Ginger Oat Biscuits	7th	Strawberry and Lime Macarons; Lemon Macarons; Chocolate and Cardamom Macarons	Safe
Yasmin	Chocolate Chip and Pistachio Biscotti	6th	Chocolate and Lime Macarons; Coffee and Walnut Macarons; Pineapple and Coconut Macarons	Safe

=== Episode 5: Pies ===
The signature challenge asked the bakers to produce a hearty family pie using either a rough puff or flaky pastry, in 2 1/2 hours. For the technical challenge, the bakers were asked to bake a batch of 6 miniature pork pies (using a hot water crust pastry) in 2 1/2 hours, using Paul Hollywood's recipe. It was a 2-day bake challenge — to give the filling time to set overnight the pies were judged the next day. For the showstopper, the bakers were asked to bake a meringue pie — a fruit and/or custard pie topped with meringue — in 3 1/2 hours.

Baker	Signature (Family Pie)	Technical (6 Miniature Pork Pie)	Showstopper (Meringue Pie)	Result
Holly	Stilton, Potato and Caramelised Onion Pie	4th	Lime Meringue Pie	Safe
Janet	Chicken and Chestnut Pie	1st	Rhubarb Meringue Pie	Star Baker
Jason	Brown Down Chicken Pie	7th	Plum Meringue Pie	Eliminated
Jo	Salmon and Asparagus Pie	6th	Apple and Raspberry Meringue Pie	Safe
Mary-Anne	Chicken and Bacon Pie	2nd	Midnight Meringue Pie	Safe
Robert	Chicken and Mushroom Pie	3rd	Rhubarb & Custard Meringue Pie	Eliminated
Yasmin	Family Fish Pie	5th	Peach and Raspberry Meringue Pie	Safe

Once again, in this episode, two bakers were eliminated instead of one baker.

=== Episode 6: Desserts (Quarterfinals) ===
For their signature bake, the quarterfinalists were tasked to produce a cheesecake in 2^{1}/_{2} hours. For the technical challenge, the bakers were asked to bake a chocolate roulade in 1 3/4 hours using Mary Berry's recipe. For the showstopper, the bakers were asked to create a Croquembouche-inspired bake in 5 hours.

Baker	Signature (Baked Cheesecake)	Technical (Chocolate Roulade)	Showstopper (Croquembouche)	Result
Holly	Father Christmas' Baked Cheesecake	3rd	Hansel and Gretel's Croquembouche	Safe
Janet	Rhubarb and Ginger Baked Cheesecake	5th	Orange and Nougatine Croquembouche	Safe
Jo	Rum and Raisin Baked Cheesecake	1st	Limoncello and White Chocolate Croquembouche	Star Baker
Mary-Anne	Tutti Frutti Curd Baked Cheesecake	4th	Orange and Praline Croquembouche with Cardamom Caramel	Safe
Yasmin	Baked Amaretto Cheesecake	2nd	Rose Croquembouche	Eliminated

=== Episode 7: Pâtisserie (Semi-final) ===
For the signature bake, the semi-finalists were given 2 hours to bake a layered mousse cake, with the judges seeking a light sponge and a rich mousse. In the technical challenge, the bakers were asked to bake 12 identical Iced Fingers to be filled with cream and jam, using Paul Hollywood's recipe. For the showstopper, the bakers were asked to produce a selection of three different pastries using the same laminated pastry dough — which must be crisp on the outside and soft on the inside — for all three.

Baker	Signature (Layered Mousse Cake)	Technical (12 Iced Fingers)	Showstopper (3 Different Types of Pastries or Croissants)	Result (Note: In this episode, none of the bakers were individually highlighted as Star Baker, as the judges decided all four deserved commendation for reaching the semi-final.)
Holly	White Chocolate, Hazelnut and Raspberry Génoise Mousse Cake	1st	Apricot, Macadamia and White Chocolate Pinwheels; Almond Croissants; Apple, Raisin and Cinnamon Plaits	Safe
Janet	Chocolate Amaretto Mousse Cake	4th	Pain Aux Raisin; Plain Croissant; Pain Au Chocolat	Eliminated
Jo	Raspberry & Strawberry Mousse Cake	3rd	Pain Aux Raisin; Chocolate Twists; Banana and Raisin Pastries	Safe
Mary-Anne	Chocolate and Orange Mousse Cake	2nd	Raspberry Rose Danishes; Praline Spirals; Alsatian Plaited Danishes	Safe

=== Episode 8: Final ===
For their final signature bake, the finalists were asked to bake 12 mille-feuille in 2 1/2 hours. For the technical challenge, the bakers were asked to bake a sachertorte in 2 hours and 40 minutes. For their final showstopper, the bakers were asked to bake 3 different types of petits fours: meringue, sweet pastry, and sponge-based, on the theme of British Summertime, within 4 hours.

Baker	Signature (12 Mille-Feuille)	Technical (Sachertorte)	Showstopper (Petits Fours)	Result
Holly	Banoffee Inspired Mille Feuille	2nd	Strawberry and Cream Meringue Nest; Gooseberry and Elderflower 'Bakewell' Tarts; Neapolitan Ice-Cream Sandwich	Runner-up
Jo	Raspberry and Blueberry Mille Feuille	1st	Mini Victoria Sandwiches; Raspberry, White Chocolate and Pistachio Mini Meringues; Mini Banoffee Pie with Banana Mousse	Winner
Mary-Anne	Lemon and Ginger Mille Feuille	3rd	Fruit Tarts with Elderflower Custard; Strawberry and Rhubarb Cheesecakes; Black Fruit Meringue with Everlasting Syllabub	Runner-up

=== Extras and special episodes ===
Both episodes nine and ten were masterclasses by Paul and Mary, where they demonstrated how to make the Technical Challenges that they had set throughout the series. Episode nine showed the first four of the series; Coffee and walnut Battenberg, Tarte au Citron, Focaccia and Brandy Snaps. Episode ten showed the last four of the series; Pork pies, Chocolate roulade, Iced fingers and Sachertorte. Episode eleven went back and revisited the bakers from series one to catch up with the contestants.

== Post-show career ==
Some of the contestants went on to a career in baking or had a change of career after appearing on the show.

Joanne Wheatley has written two bestselling books on baking, A Passion for Baking published on 16 May 2013, and Home Baking initially as a Sainsbury's exclusive. She writes a monthly column for Sainsbury's magazine and is a regular guest columnist for The Sun newspaper. She runs cookery courses from her home in Essex, and has appeared in various television programmes such as The Alan Titchmarsh Show and What's Cooking.

Holly Bell teaches baking classes and for a time worked as an occasional radio presenter on BBC Radio Leicester. She also appeared as a guest presenter on QVC shopping channel. She wrote an eBook called Ready, Steady, Bake! which was published on 5 July 2012, and published a book Recipes from a Normal Mum on 17 July 2014.

Mary-Anne Boermans wrote a book on baking, Great British Bakes: Forgotten Treasures for Modern Bakers, which was published on 7 November 2013. She later participated in the 2016 rendition of The Great Christmas Bake Off where she was declared the special's Star Baker.

Janet Basu participated in the 2016 rendition of The Great New Year's Bake Off.

Robert Billington participated in the 2017 rendition of The Great New Year's Bake Off.

== Ratings ==
Official episode viewing figures are from BARB.

Episode no.	Airdate	Viewers (millions)	BBC Two weekly ranking	Nightly ranking
1	16 August 2011	3.10	2	8
2	23 August 2011	3.53	2	8
3	30 August 2011	3.82	1	8
4	6 September 2011	3.60	1	7
5	13 September 2011	3.83	1	8
6	20 September 2011	4.25	1	6
7	27 September 2011	4.42	1	5
8	4 October 2011	5.06	1	5

=== Specials ===
The Great British Bake Off Masterclass
Episode no.	Airdate	Viewers (millions)	BBC Two weekly ranking
1	6 October 2011	2.32	6
2	13 October 2011	2.14	9

The Great British Bake Off Revisited
Episode no.	Airdate	Viewers (millions)	BBC Two weekly ranking
	20 October 2011	—N/a	—N/a
