= John Whaite =

British television baker and author

- Born: John Robert Cunningham; 23 May 1989 (age 37); Chorley, Lancashire, England
- Education: University of Manchester
- Occupations: Chef, author, baker, television personality
- Years active: 2012–present
- Television: The Great British Bake Off; Lorraine; Chopping Block; Strictly Come Dancing
- Spouse: Paul Atkins (m. 2024)

John Robert Whaite (born 23 May 1989) is an English baker who won the third series of The Great British Bake Off in 2012. He works as a chef, television presenter, and author.

== Early life ==
John Whaite was born in Chorley, Lancashire, and grew up on a farm in Wrightington. He has two sisters, Jane and Victoria. He became interested in baking at the age of seven, after his parents divorced. As a teenager, following childhood mocking, he decided to change his surname from Cunningham to his mother's maiden name, and did so when he was at college.

He won a place at Oxford to read Modern and Medieval Languages, but switched to study law at the University of Manchester to be nearer to home. In 2012 he gained a first-class degree after sitting for his law exams while filming Bake Off. He also completed a summer scheme with top law firm Eversheds Sutherland and worked briefly as a banker in the Royal Bank of Scotland's asset finance department. He rejected a career in law or banking after winning the series, and took classes at Le Cordon Bleu in London to pursue a career in cooking.

== Career ==
=== Television ===
In 2012, Whaite took part in the third series of The Great British Bake Off on BBC Two. During the sixth episode of the series Whaite sustained a major injury to his finger and could not complete the last bake. After making it through to the final, he won the show with his Italian sausage and roasted vegetable pithivier, fondant fancies, and heaven and hell chiffon cake. Despite winning the series, he won "Star Baker" only once.

Whaite has appeared as a resident chef on the ITV breakfast programme Lorraine, hosted by Lorraine Kelly. He has also appeared on This Morning, What's Cooking?, The Alan Titchmarsh Show and Sunday Brunch as a guest chef.

In April 2016, Whaite began co-presenting Chopping Block, ITV's new daytime cookery competitive show with Rosemary Shrager where four couples compete in a series of daily challenges to win a prize. A second series began airing in March 2017.

Whaite makes regular appearances, as one of its chefs, with presenter Steph McGovern on her Channel 4 daytime show Steph's Packed Lunch.

In August 2021, Whaite was announced as a contestant on the nineteenth series of Strictly Come Dancing. He was paired with professional Johannes Radebe, and they became the first ever male same-sex pairing on the show. They reached the final as one of the last two couples, but were beaten by Rose Ayling-Ellis and her partner Giovanni Pernice.

=== Cookery ===
After appearing on Bake Off, Whaite studied for a Diplôme de Pâtisserie at Le Cordon Bleu, London.

In 2015, John Whaite's kitchen cookery school, named John Whaite's Kitchen, opened in a converted 400-year-old cattle shed on his family's farm on Tunley Lane in Wrightington, Lancashire. As of December 2021, this project remains closed.

=== Writing ===
Whaite has released four cookery books. His first, John Whaite Bakes, was released on 25 April 2013, and the second, John Whaite Bakes at Home, was released on 27 March 2014. The third book, Perfect Plates in 5 Ingredients, was published in April 2016. The fourth book, Comfort: Food to soothe the soul, was published in October 2017. In 2019, he wrote A Flash in the Pan, which contains recipes for cooking using only a stovetop pan.

Whaite wrote a column on food for The Daily Telegraph. He briefly wrote the column "Hot John" for Heat magazine in 2013.

=== Theatre ===
Whaite performed in Strictly Come Dancing – the Live Tour 2022. In May 2022 it was revealed Whaite was due to join the cast of the Andrew Lloyd-Webber musical Cinderella as Prince Charming; however, the production posted a closing notice before he could make his debut. Whaite expressed that joining the cast of Cinderella would have been a "dream come true".

=== OnlyFans ===
In February 2025, Whaite announced that he had created an account on OnlyFans. Whaite claims that he has lost a brand deal with car company Peugeot, and that supermarket chain Waitrose has deleted his recipes from their website, since he became an OnlyFans content creator.

== Personal life ==
Whaite lives in Leeds with his husband Paul Atkins, a graphic designer. He announced their engagement on 21 July 2017. In 2014, John and Paul were featured in a special Love & Marriage edition of Attitude magazine. At the time, the couple had been together for nearly six years. The couple married, in a surprise ceremony in New York in, January 2024.

Whaite said he has suffered from depression. He also said he has experienced bulimia in the past. In November 2025, he revealed that he had suffered from an addiction to illegal anabolic steroids which he had started taking during the COVID-19 lockdown; the addiction had left him contemplating suicide.

In 2019, Whaite worked on a 100-acre (40 ha) farm in the mountains of British Columbia, Canada, which he found via the World-wide Opportunities on Organic Farms website.

== Publications ==
- John Whaite Bakes (2013; ISBN 9780755365104, 9780755365098)
- John Whaite Bakes at Home (2014; ISBN 9780755365135, 9780755365128)
- Perfect Plates in 5 Ingredients (2016; ISBN 9780857833518)
- Comfort: Food to Soothe the Soul (2018; ISBN 9780857835765)
- A Flash in the Pan (2019; ISBN 9780857838278, 9780857836731)
- Dancing on Eggshells (2023; ISBN 9781804191491)

Awards
Preceded by Joanne Wheatley	The Great British Bake Off winner Series Three (2012)	Succeeded by Frances Quinn
