= Harptree Court =

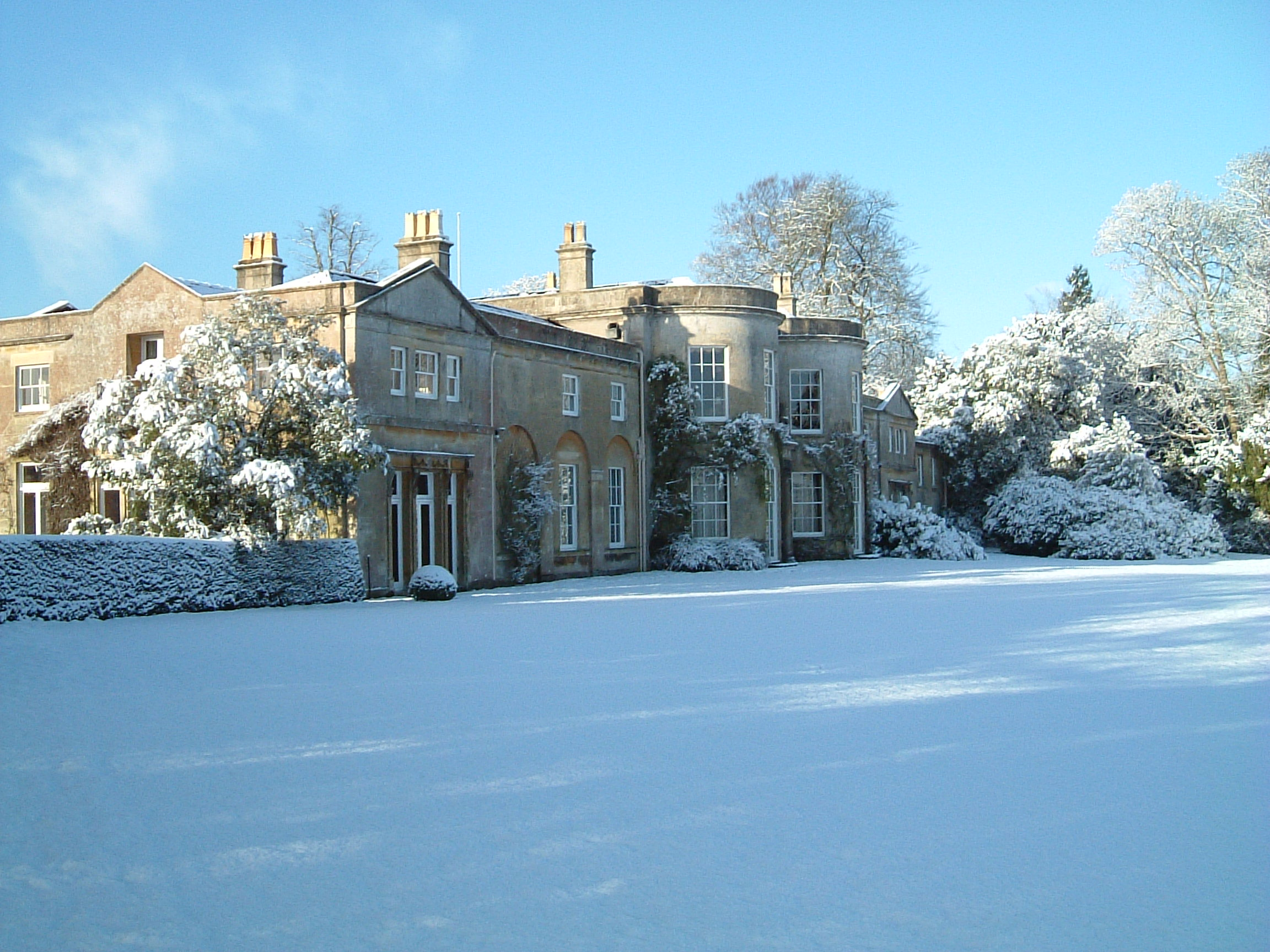
- The north facing view of Harptree Court

- Location within Somerset
- 51°18′03″N 2°37′13″W
- Location: East Harptree, Somerset, England

History
- Built: c. 1800

Site notes
- Architect: Charles Harcourt Masters
- Architectural style: neoclassical

Listed Building – Grade II
- Official name: Harptree Court
- Designated: 21 September 1960
- Reference no.: 1136425

Listed Building – Grade II
- Official name: Gatepiers at Lower Lodge south east of Harptree Court
- Designated: 15 January 1986
- Reference no.: 1136435

Listed Building – Grade II
- Official name: Gates and Piers at Upper Lodge, North of Harptree Court
- Designated: 15 January 1986
- Reference no.: 1129555

Listed Building – Grade II
- Official name: Gatepiers to Stableyard south west of Harptree Court
- Designated: 21 September 1960
- Reference no.: 1129557

Listed Building – Grade II
- Official name: Bridge, 50 metres north of Harptree Court
- Designated: 15 January 1960
- Reference no.: 1129558

Harptree Court is a Grade II listed building at East Harptree in the English county of Somerset. It was built around 1800 to designs by Charles Harcourt Masters.

== History ==
The house was built in 1797 on several fields including one known as Brookes Close. It was originally known as Richmond Hall. The original owner Joshua Scrope put the house up for sale in 1803 and it was bought by the Waldegrave family. It was sold again in 1858 when it was bought by a Miss Gurney. In 1879 it was bought by William Wildman Ketllewell.

It is now a private house.The Great British Bake Off was filmed at Harptree Court for both Series 3 and Series 4.

== Owners of Harptree Court ==
Joshua Scrope (1744-1820) built Harptree Court in 1797. He was the Lord of the Manor of Long Sutton, Lincolnshire where he had lived for many years. Originally he was born John Peart but in 1792 he changed his name to Scrope when his wife Mary inherited a large fortune from her maternal uncle Frederick James Scrope. He was born in 1744 into the well-established family of the Pearts of Lincoln. In 1771 he married Mary Vivian who was the Scrope heiress and the couple went to live in Long Sutton. Mary died in 1795 and shortly after Joshua moved to a large Estate of 1200 acres in East Harptree where he built Harptree Court. In 1798 he married Ann Brydges who was the widow of Francis William Thomas Brydges. She was born Anne Phillipps (1755-1829) and was part of the wealthy family of the Phillipps of Eaton Bishop.

The couple lived at Harptree Court until 1803 and then moved to London advertising the house for sale. The sale notice is shown here. The description of the house at this time is as follows.

"The freestone mansion house 150ft in front containing a dining parlour 36ft by 32ft, a library of the same dimensions with drawing room, study, breakfast parlour, entrance hall, elegant light staircase, airy bed chambers and suitable apartments, kitchen, hall and other interior offices. Stabling for twelve horses and double coach house."

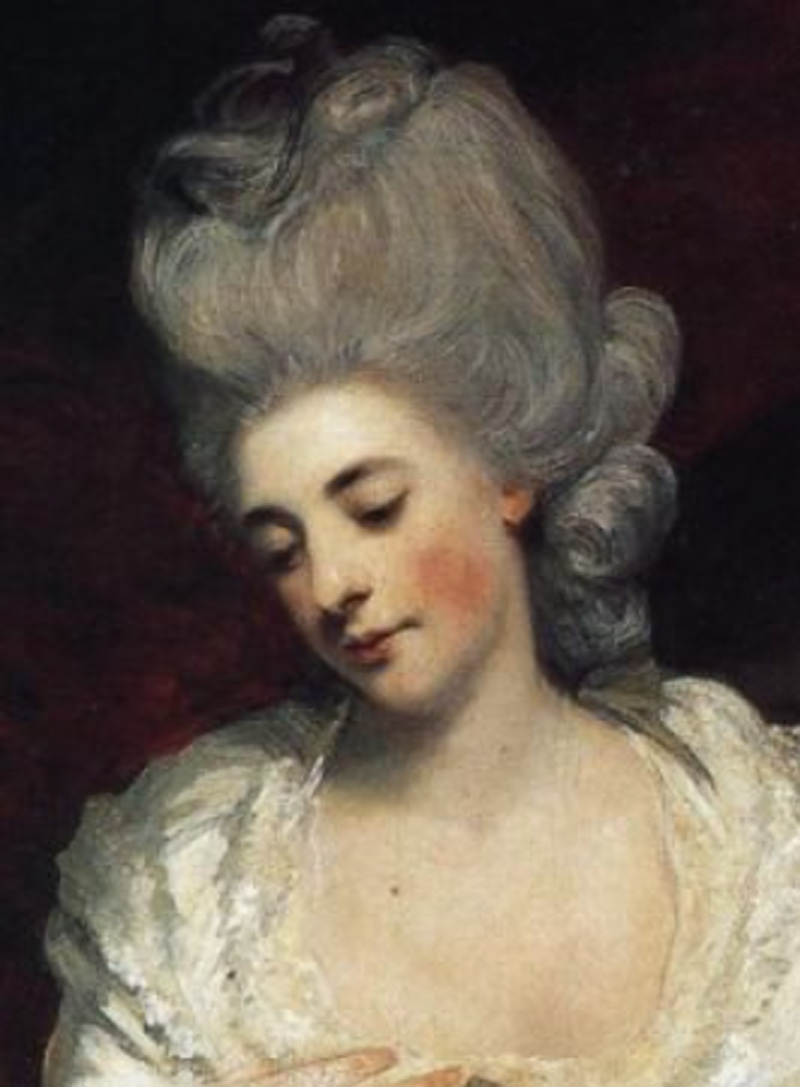
Elizabeth Laura Dowager Countess of Waldegrave

The house was bought for John James Waldegrave, 6th Earl Waldegrave but it was purchased in the name of his mother Elizabeth Laura Dowager Countess of Waldegrave and she lived there for some years She was listed in the Morning Post column of “Fashionable Arrivals and Departures” in 1806 as arriving at Harptree Court. She was the widow of George 4th Earl of Waldegrave and in 1810 she inherited Strawberry Hill House in London from her great-uncle Sir Horace Walpole. She died in 1816 and both estates were passed to her son.

John James Waldegrave was born in 1785. He succeeded to the peerage in 1794 on the death of his brother George who was drowned in the Thames near Eton. In 1802 he entered the army and quickly rose through the ranks becoming Lieutenant Colonel in the 54th Foot in 1812. He fought in the Battle of Waterloo in 1815. In the same year he married Anne King who was the daughter of the Army Chaplain. He died in 1835 and his son George Edward Waldegrave, 7th Earl Waldegrave became the owner of Harptree Court.

George Edward Waldegrave (1816-1846) was only 19 when he inherited the family estates and he quickly ran into debt. In 1840 he married Frances Elizabeth Braham (1821-1879) who was the daughter of the famous opera singer John Braham. In 1842, because of his financial difficulties, he sold all of the family treasures at Strawberry Hill House and the couple moved to Harptree Court to live. He died there in 1846 and left all of his estates to his wife. In 1860 the house was put on the market and bought by Mary Jary Gurney.

Mary Jary Gurney (1829-1872) had been recently divorced when she bought the house. She was born in 1829 and was the only child of Richard Hanbury Gurney, a Member of Parliament, who owned Thickthorn Hall in Norfolk. He left her a large fortune when he died. She married in 1846 her cousin John Henry Gurney and they were divorced in 1861. This divorce caused quite a scandal as it was granted on the grounds of her eloping with her footman from Catton Hall, William Taylor. The story is told here The Census shows both of them living at Harptree Court in 1861. A year later in 1862 she married him and became Mrs Taylor and they had two children. When she died in 1872 he was her heir. A few years later he remarried Winifred Schill and moved into the upper classes. He died in 1897 and his obituary was in the newspapers. The house was advertised for sale in 1873 and bought by William Wildman Kettlewell.

William Wildman Kettlewell (1844-1916) was born in 1844 in India. His father also named William Wildman Kettlewell (1807-1872) was a merchant in the company called Messrs Leach, Kettlewell and Co in Calcutta. He was educated at Harrow School and later went to Oxford University where he obtained his M. A. In 1866. He then joined the Army and became a Lieutenant. In 1875 he married Florence Balfour Olphert daughter of Wybrants Olphert of Ballyconnell House in Donegal. The couple moved into Harptree Court and lived there for the next forty years. He died in 1916 and in 1920 the house was sold to Charles Loraine Hill (1891-1976). The house remained in the Hill family for 100 years.

== Architecture ==
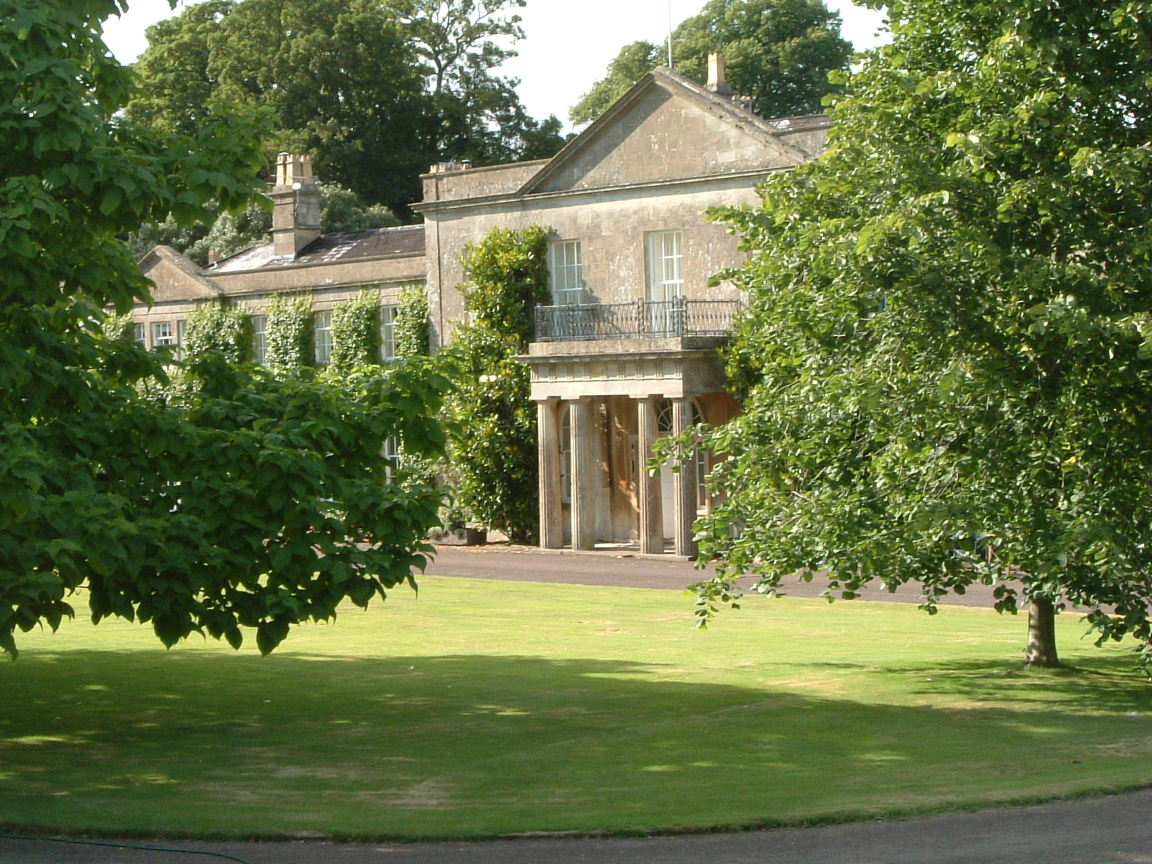
The south facing front of Harptree Court

The 11,746 square feet (1,091.2 m^{2}) house was built of Bath Stone in a neoclassical style with the front having 13 bays. There is a central Greek tetrastyle porch with an ironwork balcony above it. There are flanking bays on either side to pedimented end bays. The rear, or garden front, of the building has a similar design to the front but with a distyle ionic porch.

The gatepiers at the lower lodge have chamfered rustication and moulded cornices with elliptical ball finials. There are similar gatepiers at the upper lodge north of the house, and another at the entrance to the stable yard.

Within the grounds are two lakes fed by a small stream. The stream is crossed by a small ornamental balustraded bridge.
