= Charles Harcourt Masters =

English surveyor and architect (1759–?)

Charles Harcourt Masters (1759 – ?) was an English surveyor and architect in Bath.

He made a set of maps of Bath turnpike roads in 1786. In 1789, he made a scale model of Bath which he displayed at his home, 21 Old Orchard Street, and later in London: the plans were published in 1794. As a surveyor he worked on the development of the Widcombe and Lyncombe districts of Bath, and also laid out formal gardens and grounds. In his later career he practised as an architect under the name of Harcourt, going into partnership with George Phillips Manners: he then lived at 39 Rivers Street.

== List of works ==
- Sydney Gardens, Bathwick, Bath (1795)
- Sydney Hotel, Bathwick, Bath (now Holburne Museum of Art) (1796–1797): modifying a design of Thomas Baldwin
- Battlefield House, Lansdown, Bath (1802)
- Dyrham Park grounds, Gloucestershire (1798–1799)
- Harptree Court, East Harptree
- Bloomfield Crescent, Bath (1801)
- Portico of the Hetling Pump Room, Bath (1805): uncertain
- Widcombe Crescent and Widcombe Terrace, Bath (1805)
- Cothelstone House, Somerset, with George Phillips Manners (1817–1818)
- Remodel of the park and gardens at Dyrham Park (1800)
