= Johannes Radebe =

South African dancer

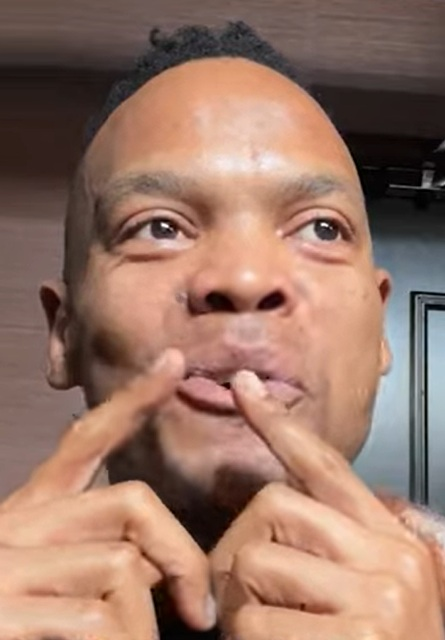
- Radebe in 2024
- Born: 27 April 1987 (age 39); Zamdela, Sasolburg Orange Free State, South Africa (now in Free State)
- Occupations: Dancer, choreographer
- Known for: Strictly Come Dancing

Johannes Radebe (born 27 April 1987) is a South African–British dancer, choreographer and presenter. He is best known for being a professional dancer on the BBC One dancing competition Strictly Come Dancing, before becoming a co-presenter from 2026.

== Early and personal life ==
Radebe was born in Zamdela, Sasolburg, Orange Free State, South Africa. His father, who worked for Coca-Cola, separated from Radebe's mother while he was still at school.

Radebe is gay and has spoken out about the homophobic bullying he received as a child. He has also spoken of how his race and class would count against him when competing at ballroom dancing competitions as a youngster. He and his sister attended a dance school in their local area. At the age of 13, he left home to live with a dance coaching couple in Gauteng province, and he attended secondary school in the Johannesburg suburb of Ennerdale.

While living in Johannesburg, Radebe spent some time homeless, sleeping in the dance studio where he worked or in the back of taxis.

In February 2026, Radebe became a British citizen.

== Career ==
Radebe began his career as a dance teacher in Johannesburg, before spending seven years dancing on cruise ships.

He has won the Professional South African Latin championships twice and has been the Amateur Latin South African champion three times.

Radebe was a professional dancer on South Africa's version of Strictly Come Dancing from 2014, for two seasons, on SABC 3 and reached the final on both occasions. He also appeared on Dancing with the Stars in 2018 on M-Net. Subsequently, he joined the touring cast of dance show Burn the Floor. In 2018, the BBC announced that Radebe would join the cast of professional dancers on the British Strictly Come Dancing, although he was not allocated a partner in his first series. In 2021, Radebe was announced as a contestant on Celebrity MasterChef.

In 2022, he choreographed the West End-themed Rusical on the first series of RuPaul's Drag Race: UK vs. the World. In December 2022, he was contestant on the Celebrity Christmas Special of BBC's The Great British Sewing Bee, which he won.

In 2023, Hodder & Stoughton published Radebe's memoir, Jojo: Finally Home, which became a bestseller. The book is subsequently being developed into a musical film by Helena Spring Films and Arrested Industries.

In 2024, he appeared in the Doctor Who episode "The Devil's Chord", alongside Shirley Ballas in a song-and-dance number with Ncuti Gatwa as the Fifteenth Doctor.

Between January and July 2025, Radebe starred as Lola in the UK tour of Kinky Boots, alongside Dan Partridge as Charlie Price. This marked Radebe's musical theatre debut. The production will transfer to the London Coliseum from March 2026 with Radebe reprising his role.

In 2026, it was announced that Radebe would be one of the new hosts of Strictly Come Dancing alongside Josh Widdicombe and Emma Willis.

=== Strictly Come Dancing ===
Series	Partner	Place	Average score
17	Catherine Tyldesley	11th	25.5
18	Caroline Quentin	8th	29.0
19	John Whaite	2nd	35.8
20	Ellie Taylor	7th	27.5
21	Annabel Croft	4th	30.8
22	Montell Douglas	6th	33.3
23	Alex Kingston	6th	30.8

Highest and lowest scoring per dance

Dance	Partner	Highest	Partner	Lowest
American Smooth	Annabel Croft	35	Caroline Quentin	28
Argentine Tango	John Whaite	39		
Cha-cha-cha	Montell Douglas	36	Ellie Taylor	21
Charleston	John Whaite	38	Annabel Croft	27
Couple's Choice	John Whaite; Montell Douglas	39	Caroline Quentin	28
Dance-a-Thon	Montell Douglas	5		
Foxtrot	Annabel Croft	33	Montell Douglas	26
Instant Dance	Alex Kingston	3		
Jive	John Whaite	39	Ellie Taylor	25
Paso Doble	John Whaite	40	Ellie Taylor	23
Quickstep	Montell Douglas	37	Annabel Croft	22
Rumba	John Whaite	39	Ellie Taylor	22
Salsa	Montell Douglas; Alex Kingston	35	John Whaite; Annabel Croft	32
Samba	John Whaite	38	Catherine Tyldesley	19
Showdance	John Whaite	40		
Tango	John Whaite	30	Catherine Tyldesley; Montell Douglas	28
Viennese Waltz	Annabel Croft; Montell Douglas	33	Catherine Tyldesley	20
Waltz	Montell Douglas; Alex Kingston	35	Caroline Quentin	29

==== Performances with Catherine Tyldesley ====
For his first competitive appearance in this show, in the seventeenth season series, he was partnered with actress Catherine Tyldesley. The couple were eliminated in week 6, placing them in 11th place, with an overall average score of 25.5.

Week	Dance & song	Judges' score				Total	Result
Week	Dance & song	Horwood	Mabuse	Ballas	Tonioli	Total	Result
1	Viennese waltz / "I Got You Babe"	5	5	5	5	20	No Elimination
2	Samba / "Let the Groove Get In"	4	5	5	5	19	Safe
3	Rumba / "Shallow"	8	8	8	8	32	Safe
4	Charleston / "Single Ladies (Put a Ring on It)	6	8	8	8	30	Safe
5	Tango / "Little Bird"	6	7	7	8*	28	Safe
6	Cha-cha-cha / "Scared of the Dark"	6	6	5	7	24	Eliminated

- *Score awarded by guest judge Alfonso Ribeiro

==== Performances with Caroline Quentin ====
For series 18, he was partnered with actress, Caroline Quentin.

Week	Dance & song	Judges' score			Total	Result
Week	Dance & song	Horwood	Ballas	Mabuse	Total	Result
1	American Smooth / "9 to 5 (Morning Train)"	7	7	7	21	No Elimination
2	Paso doble / "El gato montés"	7	7	7	21	Safe
3	Jazz / "Everything's Coming Up Roses"	6	7	8	21	Safe
4	Waltz / "With You I'm Born Again"	7	7	8*	22	Safe
5	Cha-cha-cha / "Rescue Me"	8	8	8*	24	Eliminated

- *Score awarded by guest judge Anton Du Beke

==== Performances with John Whaite ====
For series 19, he was partnered with chef John Whaite. They are the first male same-sex pairing in the history of the UK format. The couple reached the final, where they finished as Runners-Up to winners Rose Ayling-Ellis, and her partner Giovanni Pernice.

Week	Dance & song	Judges' score				Total	Result
Week	Dance & song	Horwood	Mabuse	Ballas	Du Beke	Total	Result
1	Tango / "Blue Monday"	7	7	8	8	30	No Elimination
2	Cha-cha-cha / "Starstruck"	8	8	8	7	31	Safe
3	Paso doble / "He's a Pirate"	9	10	10	10	39	Safe
4	American Smooth / "I Knew You Were Waiting (For Me)"	6	7	8	8	29	Safe
5	Charleston / "Milord"	9	9	10	10	38	Safe
6	Quickstep / "Bad Moon Rising"	8	8	9	8	33	Safe
7	Rumba / "Shape of My Heart"	8	8	10	9	35	Safe
8	Samba / "Acuyuyé"	9	10	10	9	38	Safe
9	Viennese waltz / "Chim Chim Cher-ee"	8*	8	8	8	32	Safe
10	Argentine tango / "The 5th"	9	10*	10	10	39	Safe
11	Salsa / "We Are Family"	7	8	8	9	32	Safe
12	Couple's Choice / "Hometown Glory"; Jive / "Higher Power"	9; 9	10; 10	10; 10	10; 10	39; 39	Bottom two
13	Rumba / "Shape of My Heart"; Paso doble / "He's a Pirate"; Showdance / "You Got the Love"	9; 10; 10	10; 10; 10	10; 10; 10	10; 10; 10	39; 40; 40	Runners-Up

- Green number indicates when John and Johannes were at the top of the leaderboard.
- *Score awarded by guest judge Cynthia Erivo.

==== Performances with Ellie Taylor ====
For series 20, he was partnered with comedian, Ellie Taylor.

Week	Dance & song	Judges' score				Total	Result
Week	Dance & song	Horwood	Mabuse	Ballas	Du Beke	Total	Result
1	Quickstep / "I Am What I Am"	6	7	7	8	28	No Elimination
2	Paso doble / "Les Toreadors"	4	7	5	7	23	Safe
3	Cha-cha-cha / "The Shoop Shoop Song (It's in His Kiss)"	4	6	5	6	21	Safe
4	Viennese waltz / "Boom Bang-a-Bang"	7	8	7	8	30	Safe
5	Tango / "Casualty theme"	7	7	7	8	29	Safe
6	Couple's Choice / "I Put a Spell on You"	8	9	9	9	35	Safe
7	Rumba / "Alone"	3	7	5	7	22	Safe
8	Charleston / "Friendship"	7	8	8	8	31	Safe
9	American Smooth / "You're My World"	7	8	8	8	31	Safe
10	Jive / "Brown Eyed Girl"	5	7	6	7	25	Eliminated

- Green number indicates when Ellie and Johannes were at the top of the leaderboard.
- Red number indicates when Ellie and Johannes were at the bottom of the leaderboard.

==== Performances with Annabel Croft ====
For series 21, he was partnered with former professional tennis player, Annabel Croft.

Week	Dance & song	Judges' score				Total	Result
Week	Dance & song	Horwood	Mabuse	Ballas	Du Beke	Total	Result
1	Cha-cha-cha / "Uptown Girl"	7	7	7	7	28	No Elimination
2	Quickstep / "Walking on Sunshine"	4	6	6	6	22	Safe
3	Waltz / "Moon River"	8	8	7	7	30	Safe
4	Jive / "Feel It Still"	7	7	7	8	29	Safe
5	Charleston / "Ladies' Night"	5	7	7	8	27	Safe
6	Tango / "Need You Tonight"	7	7	7	8	29	Safe
7	Couple's Choice / "Wings"	8	9	9	9	35	Safe
8	Samba / "Whenever, Wherever"	7	8	8	8	31	Safe
9	American Smooth / "Unchained Melody"	8	9	9	9	35	Safe
10	Paso doble / "España cañí"	8	9	9	10	36	Safe
11	Foxtrot / "For Good"	8	8	8	9	33	No elimination
12	Salsa / "You'll Be Mine (Party Time)"; Viennese waltz / "Please Please Please Let Me Get What I Want"	8; 8	8; 8	8; 8	8; 9	32; 33	Eliminated

- Red number indicates when Annabel and Johannes were at the bottom of the leaderboard.

==== Performances with Montell Douglas ====
For series 22, he was partnered with Olympic sprinter, Montell Douglas.

Week	Dance & song	Judges' score				Total	Result
Week	Dance & song	Horwood	Mabuse	Ballas	Du Beke	Total	Result
1	Foxtrot / "Is You Is or Is You Ain't My Baby"	6	7	6	7	26	No Elimination
2	Samba / "Fuego"	8	7	7	8	30	Safe
3	Tango / "One Night Only"	7	7	7	7	28	Safe
4	Viennese waltz / "Nobody Gets Me"	8	8	8	9	33	Safe
5	Couple's Choice / "Skeleton Move"	9	10	10	10	39	Safe
6	Cha-cha-cha / "Love Potion No. 9"	9	9	9	9	36	Safe
7	Waltz / "I Will Always Love You"	8	9	9	9	35	Bottom two
8	Paso doble / "Lola's Theme"	9	9	9	9	36	Safe
9	Salsa / "Don't Leave Me This Way"	8	9	9	9	35	Bottom two
10	Quickstep / "Get Happy"; Samba-thon / "Samba" & "La Vida Es Un Carnaval"	8 Awarded	10; 5	9 Extra	10; Points	37; 42	Bottom two
11	Rumba / "I'm Here"	7	8	8	8	31	Eliminated

- Green number indicates when Montell and Johannes were at the top of the leaderboard.

==== Performances with Alex Kingston ====
For series 23, he was partnered with actress, Alex Kingston.

Week	Dance & song	Judges' score				Total	Result
Week	Dance & song	Horwood	Mabuse	Ballas	Du Beke	Total	Result
1	Viennese waltz / "Cry Me a River"	4	6	5	6	21	No Elimination
2	Samba / "La Bamba"	7	8	8	8	31	Safe
3	Quickstep / "Suddenly I See"	7	8	7	8	30	Safe
4	Rumba / “Fast Car”	8	9	10	9	36	Safe
5	Foxtrot / “Here You Come Again”	7	8	8	9	32	Safe
6	Salsa / “Horny”	8	9	9	9	35	Safe
7	Paso Doble / “Amparito Roca"	7	8	7	8	30	Safe
8	Waltz / "Weekend in New England"	8	9	9	9	35	Safe
9	Couple's choice / "History Repeating" + "Look At Me"	8	9	9	9	35	No Elimination
10	Cha-cha-cha / "Ring My Bell"	4	6	6	7	23 (Note: The couple also received three extra points for their Rumba to "Show Me Heaven" by Maria McKee in the Instant Dance.)	Eliminated

- Green number indicates when Alex and Johannes were at the top of the leaderboard.
- Red number indicates when Alex and Johannes were at the bottom of the leaderboard.

== Tours ==
Year	Show	No. of shows	Notes
2022	FREEDOM	30	1st solo show
2022	Strictly Come Dancing Live 2022	21 shows	
2023	FREEDOM UNLEASHED	42	
2024	House of Jojo	38	

Key
†	Denotes productions that are upcoming
