= The Great British Bake Off series 3 =

Third series of The Great British Bake Off

The Great British Bake Off
- Series 3
- Presented by: Mel Giedroyc; Sue Perkins
- Judges: Mary Berry; Paul Hollywood
- No. of contestants: 12
- Winner: John Whaite
- Runners-up: Brandon Lynch; James Morton
- Location: Harptree Court (East Harptree, Somerset)
- No. of max. bakes: 30
- No. of episodes: 10

Release
- Original network: BBC Two
- Original release: 14 August – 16 October 2012

Series chronology
- ← Previous; Series 2 Next → Series 4

The third series of The Great British Bake Off began airing on Tuesday 14 August 2012. The series was filmed at Harptree Court in East Harptree, Somerset.

Seven thousand applied for the competition and twelve contestants were chosen. The competition was won by John Whaite.

The third series was broadcast as the fifth season on PBS in the United States.

== Bakers ==
Contestant	Age	Hometown	Occupation	Finish	Place
Natasha Stringer	36	Tamworth, England	Midwife	Episode 1	12th
Peter Maloney	43	Windsor, England	Sales manager	Episode 2	11th
Victoria Chester	50	Somerset, England	CEO of the charity Plantlife	Episode 3	10th
Stuart Marston-Smith	26	Lichfield, England	PE teacher	Episode 4	9th
Manisha Parmar	27	Leicester, England	Nursery nurse	Episode 5	8th
Sarah-Jane Willis	28	Bewbush, England	Vicar's wife	Episode 7	6th (tie)
Ryan Chong	38	Bristol, England	Photographer	Episode 7	6th (tie)
Cathryn Dresser	27	Pease Pottage, England	Shop assistant	Episode 8	5th
Danny Bryden	45	Sheffield, England	Intensive care consultant	Episode 9	4th
Brendan Lynch	63	Sutton Coldfield, England	Recruitment consultant	Episode 10	Runner-up
James Morton	21	Hillswick, Scotland	Medical student	Episode 10	Runner-up
John Whaite	22	Wigan, England	Law student	Episode 10	1st

== Results summary ==
Elimination chart
Baker	1	2	3	4	5	6	7	8	9	10
John	SAFE	SB	SAFE	SAFE	SAFE	LOW	LOW	HIGH	LOW	WINNER
Brendan	SAFE	HIGH	LOW	SB	HIGH	SB	HIGH	SAFE	HIGH	Runner-up
James	SAFE	HIGH	SB	SAFE	SAFE	LOW	LOW	SB	SB	Runner-up
Danny	SAFE	SAFE	SAFE	HIGH	LOW	HIGH	SB	LOW	OUT	
Cathryn	HIGH	SAFE	SAFE	SAFE	SAFE	SAFE	LOW	OUT		
Ryan	SAFE	SAFE	SAFE	LOW	SB	SAFE	OUT			
Sarah-Jane	SAFE	SAFE	SAFE	SAFE	LOW	LOW	OUT			
Manisha	SAFE	SAFE	SAFE	LOW	OUT					
Stuart	LOW	LOW	HIGH	OUT						
Victoria	SB	LOW	OUT							
Peter	SAFE	OUT								
Natasha	OUT									

^{[1]} There was no elimination the sixth week after John sustained a major injury to his finger and could not complete the last bake. The judges determined it would be unfair to eliminate anyone and instead, two bakers were eliminated the next week.

Colour key:

Baker got through to the next round
Baker was eliminated
Baker was one of the judges' least favourite bakers that week, but was not eliminated.
Baker was the Star Baker
Baker was one of the judges' favourite bakers that week, but did not win star baker
Baker was the series runner-up
Baker was the series winner

== Episodes ==
Colour key:

Baker was eliminated at conclusion of episode
Baker was named "Star Baker" at conclusion of episode
Baker was named runner-up for the series
Baker won series

=== Episode 1: Cakes ===
For their signature bake, the contestants were required to make an upside-down cake filled with fruits of their choice in 2 hours. For the technical bake, Paul set the bakers the challenge of making 4 rum babas with cream in the middle and sliced fruits on top, to be completed in 3 hours. For the showstopper, the bakers were given the task of making a cake that would reveal a hidden design when sliced open in 5 hours.

Baker	Signature (Upside Down Cake)	Technical (4 Rum Babas)	Showstopper (Hidden Design Cake)	Result
Brendan	Plum, Sour Cherry & Walnut Upside Down Cake	10th	St. Patrick's Day Cake with Hidden Irish Flag*	Safe
Cathryn	Apple, Hazelnut and Calvados Upside Down Cake	5th	Hidden Cupcake Cake	Safe
Danny	Plum, Ginger & Orange Upside Down Cake	7th	Nectar Cake with Hidden Beehive*	Safe
James	Parsnip, Pear and Pecan Upside Down Cake	2nd	"Simmer Dim" Sunset Cake	Safe
John	Toffee Apple, Orange & Cranberry Upside Down Cake	11th	Hidden Pink Hearts Cake	Safe
Manisha	Vanilla, Peach and Raspberry Upside Down Cake	6th	White Chocolate Cake with a Red Velvet and White Chocolate Mousse Heart*	Safe
Natasha	Pineapple & Passion Fruit Upside Down Cake	12th	Mother's Day Layered Rose Cake	Eliminated
Peter	Pear, Muscat & Chocolate Upside Down Cake	3rd	Jubilee Cake	Safe
Ryan	Kumquat and Orange Polenta Upside Down Cake	8th	Hidden Flowerbed Mousse Cake	Safe
Sarah-Jane	Pear, Chocolate and Hazelnut Upside Down Cake	1st	Hidden Crown Cake	Safe
Stuart	Tomato and Ginger Upside Down Cake	9th	Lemon and Pistachio Union Flag Cake	Safe
Victoria	Pear and Pecan Upside Down Cake	4th	Blackbird Pie Cake	Star Baker

* Unseen in the episode

=== Episode 2: Bread ===
For the signature bake, the bakers were required to make 12 flatbreads, 6 with yeast and 6 without, in 2 1/2 hours. For the technical challenge, they had to make an eight-strand plaited (braided) loaf in 2 hours, using Paul Hollywood's recipe. For the showstopper bake, the bakers were given 4 hours to make 24 bagels: 12 sweet and 12 savoury.

Baker	Signature 12 Flatbreads (6 Leavened and 6 unleavened)	Technical (Eight-Stranded Plaited Loaf)	Showstopper 24 Bagels (12 Sweet and 12 Savoury)	Result
Brendan	Middle Eastern Taboon Bread; Indian Roti	4th	Chocolate and Vanilla Bagels; Cumin and Gruyere Bagels	Safe
Cathryn	Spiced Mango Naan; Lime, Coriander and Chilli Tortillas	8th	Cranberry and Orange Bagels; Chipotle, Chilli, and Smoked Cheddar Bagels	Safe
Danny	Lime Coriander and Coconut Tortillas; Zaatar Naan with Dukkah	3rd	UNKNOWN	Safe
James	Tomato, Garlic, and Parmesan Flatbreads; Tattie Scones	2nd	Orange, Mint and Chocolate Bagels 'Millers' Sourdough Bagels	Safe
John	Coriander and Chilli Rotis; Garlic, Pomegranate and Potato Pitas	1st	Fig, Walnut and Gruyere Bagels; Blueberry and White Chocolate Bagels	Star Baker
Manisha	Indian Flatbreads; Italian Flatbreads	6th	UNKNOWN	Safe
Peter	Fennel and Nigella Seed Naan; Bannock Bread	11th	Rosemary and Sea Salt Bagels; Apple and Cinnamon Bagels	Eliminated
Ryan	Shanghai Spring Onion Flatbread; Garlic and Coriander Naan	5th	Cinnamon and Date Bagels; Tarragon and Rosemary Bagels	Safe
Sarah-Jane	Coconut Roti; Oatcakes	10th	UNKNOWN	Safe
Stuart	Bombay Bread; Chorizo and Spring Onion Naan	9th	Cinnamon and Cranberry Bagels; Tomato and Thyme Bagels	Safe
Victoria	Coriander and Lemon Naan; Garlic and Parsnip Chapatis	7th	Saffron and Golden Raisin Bagels; Porcini Bagels	Safe

=== Episode 3: Tarts ===
The classic tarte tatin, either sweet or savory, was set as the signature challenge, to be finished in 2 1/2 hours. Baking a treacle tart in 2 hours was set as the technical challenge by Mary Berry, with the requirement that the pastry lattice on top be woven. For the showstopper, the bakers were required to make a large designer fruit tart, fit for a window display, in 3 hours.

Baker	Signature (Tarte Tatin)	Technical (Treacle Tart)	Showstopper (Designer Fruit Tart)	Result
Brendan	Apple and Ginger Tarte Tatin	9th	Blackberry, Nectarine and Dragon Fruit Tart	Safe
Cathryn	Plum, Cherry and Five Spice Tarte Tatin	3rd	Raspberry, Pistachio and Lemon Tart	Safe
Danny	Savoury Pear and Roquefort Tarte Tatin	2nd	Pineapple, Coconut and Frangipane Tart	Safe
James	Apple and Lavender Tarte Tatin	1st	Rose, Lychee and Raspberry Fruit Tart	Star Baker
John	Apple and Vanilla Tarte Tatin with Walnut Praline	6th	Berries, Grapes, Pomegranate, and Dragon Fruit Tart	Safe
Manisha	Cinnamon, Apple and Pear Tarte Tatin	10th	Rum and Tropical Fruit Tart	Safe
Ryan	Spiced Pear Tarte Tatin	5th	UNKNOWN	Safe
Sarah-Jane	Caramelised Banana Tarte Tatin	8th	French Apple Tart with Blackberry and Cassis Jam	Safe
Stuart	Pear and Almond Tarte Tatin	7th	Raspberry Triple Chocolate Layered Tart	Safe
Victoria	Fig, Walnut and Pink Peppercorn Tarte Tatin	4th	Tropical Fruit Tart with Black Pepper Crust	Eliminated

=== Episode 4: Desserts ===
The bakers were given 3 hours to make a torte without conventional wheat flour as the signature bake. The torte had to be more than 20 cm in diameter. Mary set crème caramel as the technical challenge, to be finished in 2^{3}/_{4} hours. A four-layered meringue dessert was the showstopper challenge.

Baker	Signature (Torte Cake)	Technical (Crème Caramel)	Showstopper (4-Layered Meringue Dessert)	Result
Brendan	Clementine and Chestnut Torte	1st	Pear, Chocolate and Hazelnut Dacquoise	Star Baker
Cathryn	White Chocolate, Macadamia and Coffee Torte	3rd	Gooseberry, Almond and Honey Meringue	Safe
Danny	Blackberry, White Chocolate, Lemon and Elderflower Torte	2nd	'Monte Bianco' Chestnut, Chocolate and Coffee Dacquoise	Safe
James	Hazelnut, Chocolate and Passionfruit Torte	5th	Fig, Chestnut, Cherry and Chocolate Layered Meringue	Safe
John	'Torte Noir' Black Forest Torte with Boozy Cream	6th	Elderflower and Bramble Berry Pavlova	Safe
Manisha	Almond, Chocolate and Cherry Torte	9th	Tiramisu Layered Meringue Dessert	Safe
Ryan	Green Tea Opera Torte	7th	Strawberry, Rose and Pistachio Meringue	Safe
Sarah-Jane	Chocolate and Almond Truffle Torte	4th	Hazelnut Tiramisu Layered Meringue	Safe
Stuart	Black Forest Torte	8th	Choca Blocka Mocha Meringue	Eliminated

=== Episode 5: Pies ===
The signature bake was Wellington, which Paul specified should be at least 8 inches long and completely covered with pastry. The bakers were given 3 hours for the challenge. The technical challenge was to make a hand-raised pie in 2^{1}/_{4} hours. This was to be made with a hot water crust and moulded using a dolly. The pie was left to set overnight and judged the next day. For the showstopper challenge, the bakers were required to bake a family-sized sweet American-style pie in 3^{1}/_{2} hours.

Baker	Signature (Wellington)	Technical (Hand-Raised Pie)	Showstopper (American Pie)	Result
Brendan	Salmon Coulibiac in a Scandinavian Pastry	3rd	All American Chiffon Pie	Safe
Cathryn	Full English Wellington	1st	Chocolate and Peanut Butter Pumpkin Pie	Safe
Danny	Chickpea, Spinach & Mushroom Wellington	7th	Trick or Treat Pumpkin Pie	Safe
James	Four Pig Wellington	6th	Sweet Potato Pie	Safe
John	Venison and Haggis Wellington	2nd	Star Spangled Pecan Pie	Safe
Manisha	Lamb Wellington with Rosemary and Mint	5th	Banana Scotch Pie	Eliminated
Ryan	Curry Spiced Seabass Wellington	8th	Key Lime Pie	Star Baker
Sarah-Jane	Beef Wellington with Parma Ham and Gorgonzola Cheese	4th	Chocolate and Banana Cream Pie	Safe

=== Episode 6: Puddings ===
The bakers were challenged to make, in 2 hours, 2 different flavoured sponge puddings with different accompaniments, 6 of each. Mary set the Queen of Puddings as the technical challenge. For the showstopper, the bakers were required to make a large strudel, either with sweet or savoury fillings, in 3 1/2 hours.

Baker	Signature (2 Different Flavours of Sponge Puddings)	Technical (Queen of Puddings)	Showstopper (Strudels)	Result (Note: John sustained a deep wound on his finger during the Showstopper challenge, had to leave the tent to receive medical attention, and was unable to complete his bake. As a result, the judges decided it would be unfair to eliminate a baker this week.)
Brendan	Rhubarb, Strawberry and Ginger Puddings; Sticky Toffee Puddings	1st	Spinach, Cheese and Walnut Strudel	Star Baker
Cathryn	Chocolate Walnut Whip Puddings; Elderflower Sponges	3rd	Roasted Vegetable Couscous and Sheep Cheese Strudel	Safe
Danny	Banoffee Puddings with Walnut Butterscotch Sauce; Jubilee Chocolate Fondants	2nd	Leek, Potato, Pistachio and Gruyère Strudel	Safe
James	Banana and Clove Puddings; Clootie Dumplings	7th	Strawberry, Rhubarb and Ginger Strudel	Safe
John	Spicy Toffee Puddings; Raspberry and White Chocolate Puddings	5th	Did not complete due to injury	Safe
Ryan	Chocolate Fondants; Sticky Ginger and Date Puddings	6th	Apple, Sour Cherry, Raisin and Mixed Nuts Strudel	Safe
Sarah-Jane	Sticky Toffee Puddings; Granny's Saucy Lemon Puddings	4th	Sweet Strudel with Sour Cherries	Safe

=== Episode 7: Sweet Dough ===
For the signature bake, the bakers were set to bake 24 buns made from an enriched dough with yeast in 3 hours. The buns should be all of the same size and evenly baked. For the technical bake, the bakers were challenged to make 10 jam doughnuts, using Paul Hollywood's recipe, in 2^{1}/_{2} hours. They should be consistent in size, shape, jam distribution, and colour. For the showstopper, the bakers each made a celebratory enriched-dough loaf. This challenge started straight after the technical bake, so that the dough could be proofed overnight if necessary.

Baker	Signature (24 Sweet Buns)	Technical (Jam Doughnut)	Showstopper (Celebratory Loaf)	Result (Note: Two bakers were eliminated this week as there was no elimination the previous week following John's injury.)
Brendan	Chelsea Bunskis	4th	Black Forest Christmas Stollen	Safe
Cathryn	Lady Arundel's Manchet Buns	5th	Bonfire Night Tear 'N' Share Brioche	Safe
Danny	Bakewell Chelsea Buns	2nd	European Christmas Wreath	Star Baker
James	Easter Chelsea Buns	1st	Whisky Kugelhopf-Brioche Baba	Safe
John	Cherry and Almond Saffron Buns	3rd	Marzipan Stollen	Safe
Ryan	Lardy Cakes (Note: Ryan's handshake was the first "Hollywood Handshake" in the history of the show.)	6th	Char Siu Bao	Eliminated
Sarah-Jane	Orange, Nutmeg and Saffron Buns	7th	Sour Cherry and Dark Chocolate Christmas Plait	Eliminated

=== Episode 8: Biscuits ===
The bakers were given 2 hours to make 48 crackers or crisp breads for their signature bake. They should be thin, evenly baked and crack when snapped in two. For the technical challenge, the bakers were asked to make six chocolate teacakes in 2 hours using Paul Hollywood's recipe, a task made more difficult because the high temperature that day would not allow the chocolate to cool. For the showstopper bake, the bakers were challenged to make a gingerbread structure, which should not be a gingerbread house, in 4 hours.

Baker	Signature (48 Crackers)	Technical (6 Chocolate Teacakes)	Showstopper (Gingerbread Structure)	Result
Brendan	Multi-Seed Savoury Crackers	2nd	Fantasy Gingerbread Bird House	Safe
Cathryn	Cheese and Pickle Crackers	5th	Gingerbread Buckingham Palace	Eliminated
Danny	Spiced Almond Drinks Crackers	4th	Gingerbread Big Ben	Safe
James	Smoky Cayenne, Cumin and Chilli Crackers	1st	Gingerbread Barn	Star Baker
John	Asian Spice Crackers	3rd	Gingerbread Roman Coliseum	Safe

=== Episode 9: Pâtisserie (Semifinal) ===
For the first pâtisserie test, the bakers were required to make 3 types of petits fours, 12 of each. These should be small (each a single mouthful), exquisite and perfect. Mary set the bakers to make a Fraisier cake for the technical challenge to be done in 2^{1}/_{2} hours. Choux pastry gateau was set as the showstopper.

Baker	Signature (3 types of Petits Fours)	Technical (Fraisier Cake)	Showstopper (Choux Pastry Gateau)	Result
Brendan	Coffee Meringue and Hazelnut Creams; Apricot and Pistachio Friands; Lime Curd Choux Pastry Cygnets	3rd	Gateau St. Honoré	Safe
Danny	Blackberry and Peppermint Macarons; Miniature Raspberry and Basil Financiers; Orange and White Chocolate Langues de Chat	4th	Rosewater and Lychee Gateau St. Honoré	Eliminated
James	Lemon and Rhubarb Tartlets; Chocolate Indulgence Petits Fours; Chilli, Lime and Raspberry Macarons	1st	Coffee, Caramel and Hazelnut Paris–Brest	Star Baker
John	Lemon Madeleines; White Chocolate and Raspberry Tartlets; Dark Chocolate and Cherry Macarons	2nd	Gateau St. Honoré a la Passion	Safe

=== Episode 10: Final ===
The finalists were set the task of making a savoury pithivier in 2^{1}/_{2} hours. Paul and Mary's technical challenge required 25 fondant fancies to be done in 2^{1}/_{2}hours. For the final showstopper, the finalists were required to make, in 4 hours, a chiffon cake based on the theme of their personal highlights of 2012. All the bakes were served at a special summer fête held on the ground of Harptree Court.

Baker	Signature (Savoury Pithivier)	Technical (25 Fondant Fancies)	Showstopper (Chiffon Cake)	Result
Brendan	Potato and Pepper Pithivier	3rd	Family Reunion Chiffon Cake	Runner-up
James	Spanish Pithivier with Chorizo and Red Pepper	1st	United Chiffon Cakes	Runner-up
John	Italian Sausage and Roasted Vegetable Pithivier	2nd	Heaven and Hell Chiffon Cake	Winner

=== Extras and special episodes (Episodes 11–14) ===
Four additional episodes were broadcast after the final.

- Episode 11 was a masterclass by Paul and Mary where they demonstrated how to make the technical challenges they set – treacle tarts, rum babas, creme caramels, the hand-raised pie, and the eight-strand plaited loaf.
- Episode 12 revisited the bakers from series two to catch up on what these contestants had been doing after the show ended.
- Another masterclass was shown in episode 13 where Paul and Mary showed how to make Queen of Puddings, jam doughnuts, tempered chocolate teacakes, Fraisier cakes and fondant fancies.
- In episode 14, Paul and Mary showed which signature bakes they would have chosen if they were in the bakers' shoes (including sponge puddings, flat breads and sweet buns). Two further episodes of Masterclass were shown, one before Christmas and another before Easter.

== Post-show career ==
John Whaite gained a first-class degree from the University of Manchester after sitting his law exams while filming Bake Off, but he rejected a career in law and opted to take classes at Le Cordon Bleu and pursue a career in baking. His book John Whaite Bakes: Recipes for Every Day and Every Mood was published on 25 April 2013. His second book, John Whaite Bakes at Home, was published on 27 March 2014. He first set up a chocolate shop The Hungry Dog Artisan Chocolates, and opened a cookery school on his family's dairy farm in Lancashire. He also appeared as a resident chef on the ITV show Lorraine, and wrote a column on food for The Daily Telegraph. In 2016, Whaite presented with Rosemary Shrager a daytime cookery competitive show Chopping Block on ITV. In 2018, after six years of directing his attention on writing cookbooks, leading baking classes, and making television appearances, Whaite decided to refocus on law.

James Morton aimed for a career in medicine but has written a book on bread, titled Brilliant Bread, published on 29 August 2013. He writes a baking column for the Scottish newspaper Sunday Mail. His second book, How Baking Works: ...And what to do if it doesn't, was published on 12 March 2015. He later participated in both the 2016 and 2024 renditions of The Great New Year's Bake Off.

Brendan Lynch is teaching cookery classes.

Cathryn Dresser and Sarah-Jane Willis teamed up to open a stall at Horsham Market. Dresser wrote a baking book for children and parents titled Let's Bake, published on 22 May 2014. and ran The Little Handcross Bakery in Handcross, West Sussex between September 2014 and May 2015. Dresser later participated in the 2016 rendition of The Great Christmas Bake Off.

== Ratings ==
The final of this series had a record overnight figure of 6.5 million viewers, beating every other programme in other channels in its time slot.

Official episode viewing figures are from BARB.

Episode no.	Airdate	Viewers (millions)	BBC Two weekly ranking	Nightly ranking
1	14 August 2012	3.85	1	7
2	21 August 2012	4.60	1	5
3	28 August 2012	4.53	1	5
4	4 September 2012	4.71	1	4
5	11 September 2012	4.61	1	3
6	18 September 2012	4.82	1	3
7	25 September 2012	5.10	1	4
8	2 October 2012	5.35	1	4
9	9 October 2012	5.70	1	4
10	16 October 2012	6.74	1	3

=== Specials ===
The Great British Bake Off Masterclass
Episode no.	Airdate	Viewers (millions)	BBC Two weekly ranking
1	22 October 2012	2.56	5
2	24 October 2012	2.19	8
3	25 October 2012	2.33	6

The Great British Bake Off Revisited
Episode no.	Airdate	Viewers (millions)	BBC Two weekly ranking
	23 October 2012	2.76	4

The Great British Bake Off, Christmas Masterclass
Episode no.	Airdate	Viewers (millions)	BBC Two weekly ranking
	18 December 2012	3.48	2

The Great British Bake Off, Easter Masterclass
Episode no.	Airdate	Viewers (millions)	BBC Two weekly ranking
	26 March 2013	2.76	3
