= Viennese whirls =

British shortbread biscuits

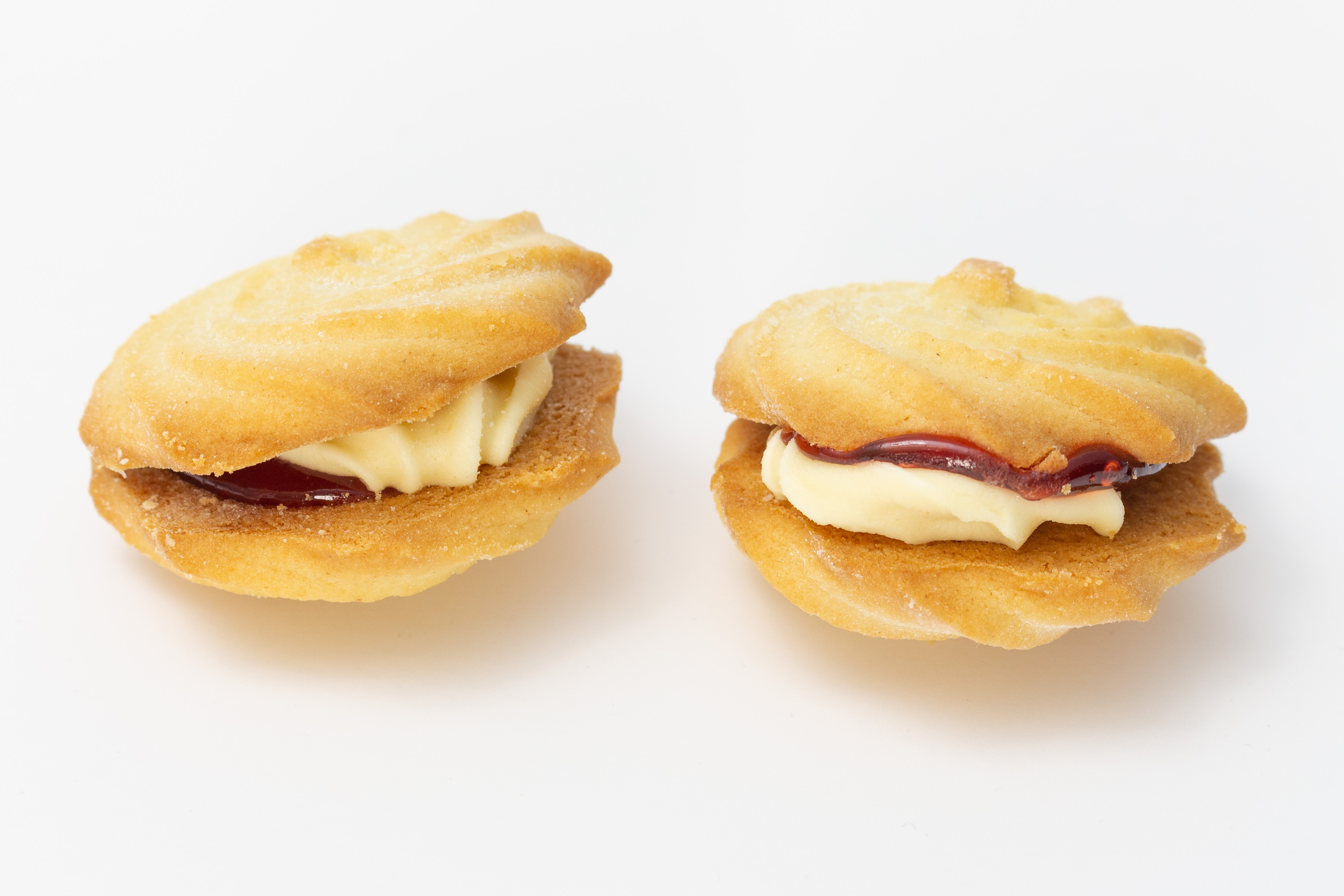
- Viennese whirls with a creme filling and raspberry purée, made by Mr Kipling
- Type: Biscuit
- Place of origin: United Kingdom
- Main ingredients: Shortbread, buttercream, jam

Viennese whirls are a British biscuit consisting of soft shortbread cakes piped into a whirl shape, named for the city of Vienna and said to be inspired by Austrian pastries, which share the name Spritzgebäck and come in various shapes with different fillings and decorations. Examples are Linzer Stangerl or Linzer Kipferl, which are named after the Austrian city of Linz.

The most common UK version was popularised by Mr Kipling, consisting of two shortbread biscuits sandwiched with buttercream and jam. In this sense they resemble the older Empire biscuit.

Other varieties can have a single layer with chocolate piping.

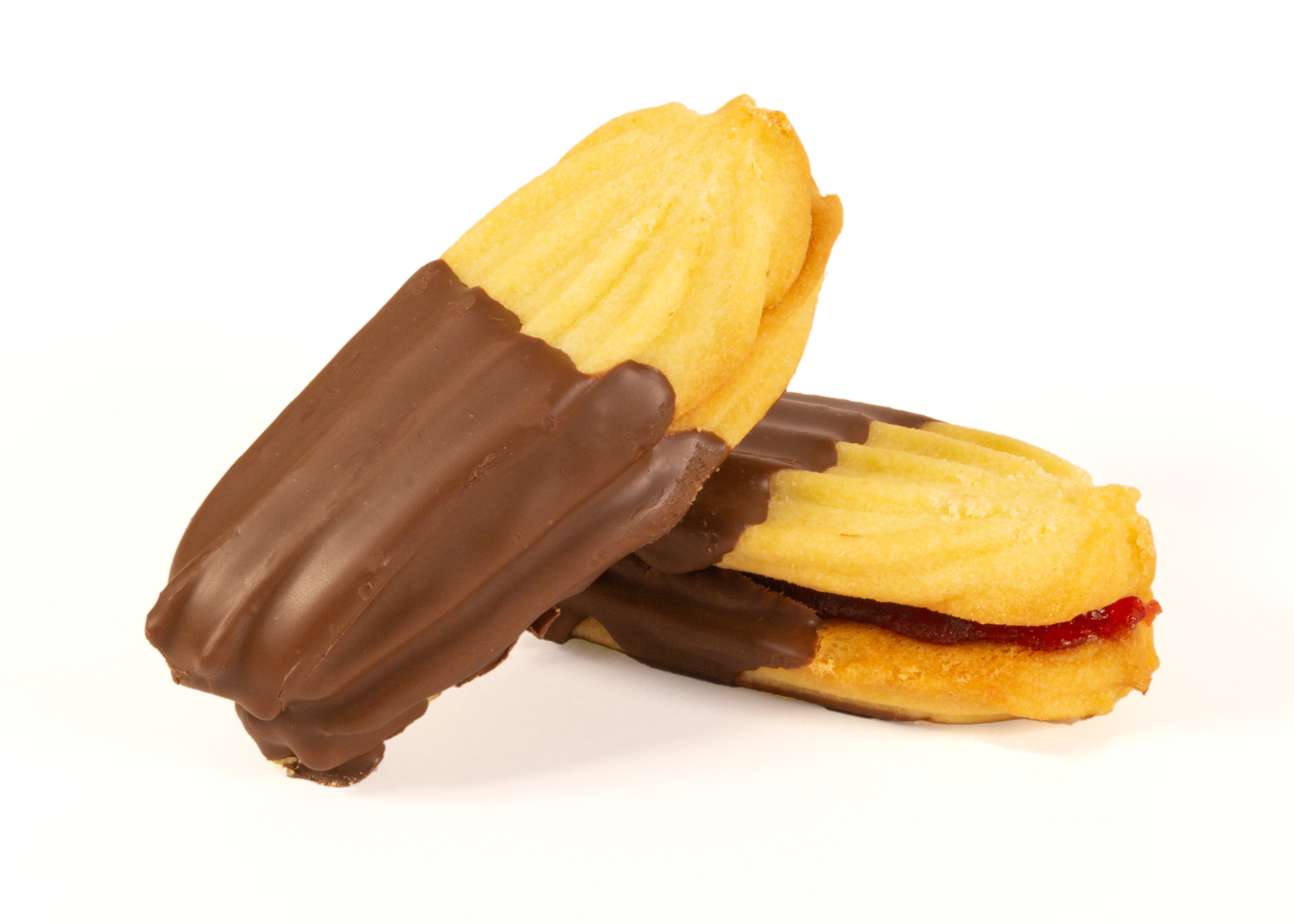
Chocolate Viennese fingers with a raspberry flavoured filling. These are called Linzer Stangerl in Austria.

There can be many different ways to make the shape of them (like into straight lines or finger shaped) and many different ways to pipe them. They can be dipped in chocolate or any other dipping.

Viennese whirls can also have different kinds of fillings piped or spread into them. They can also be made plain.

== See also ==
- List of shortbread biscuits and cookies
