= What's Cooking? (British TV series) =

- Presented by: Ben Shephard; Lisa Faulkner
- Country of origin: United Kingdom
- Original language: English
- No. of series: 1
- No. of episodes: 65

Production
- Running time: 70 minutes (inc. adverts)
- Production company: Superhero TV

Original release
- Network: Channel 4
- Release: 25 February – 24 May 2013

What's Cooking? is a British lifestyle show that aired on Channel 4 from 25 February to 24 May 2013. It was hosted by Ben Shephard and Lisa Faulkner.
