= Basque cheesecake =

Crustless cheesecake

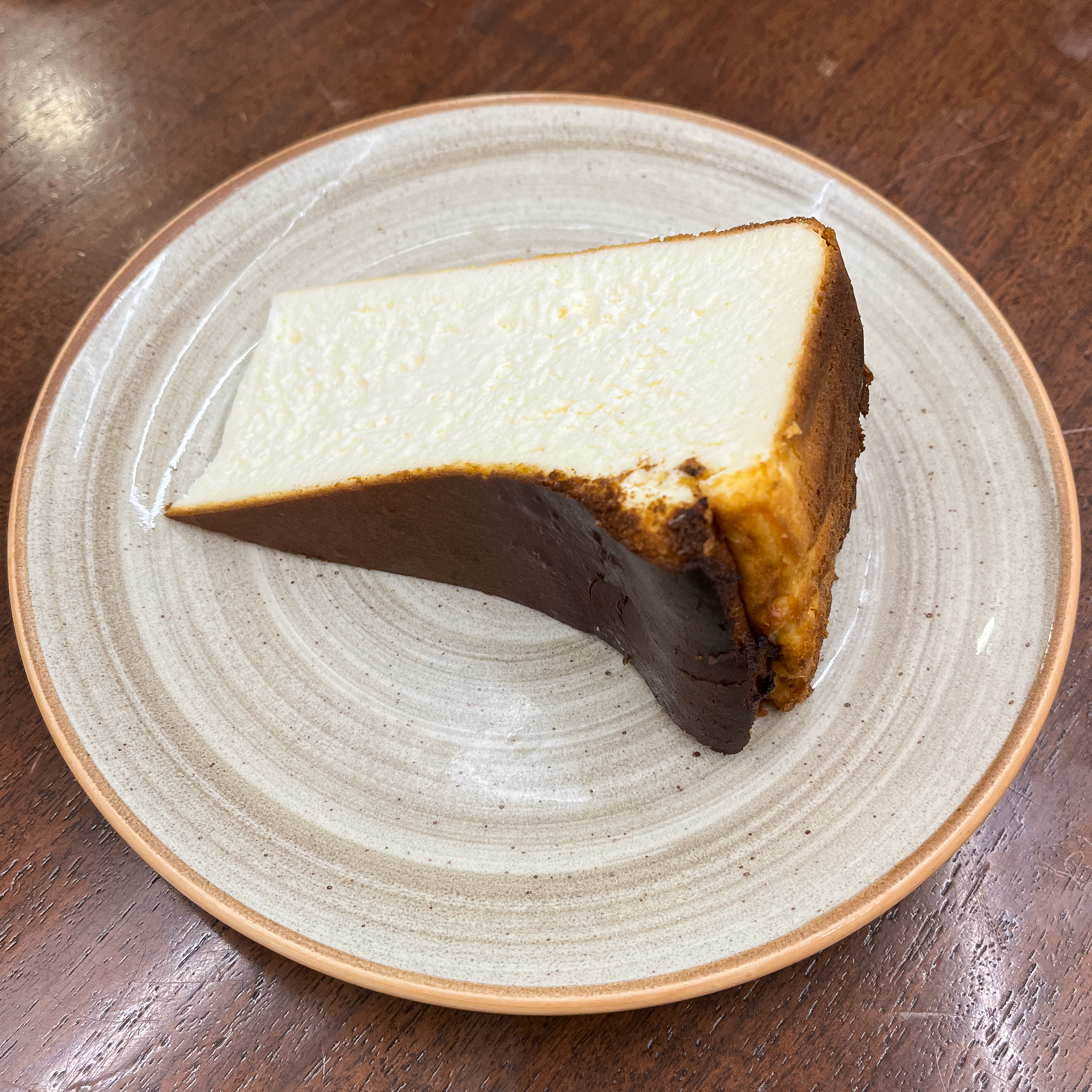
- Course: Dessert
- Place of origin: Spain
- Region or state: Basque Country
- Created by: Santiago Rivera
- Invented: 1988
- Main ingredients: Cream cheese, sugar, eggs, cream, flour

Basque cheesecake (Basque: euskal gazta-tarta, Spanish: tarta de queso vasca), is a crustless cheesecake. It was created in 1988 by Santiago Rivera, chef and owner of the restaurant La Viña in San Sebastián in the Basque Country, Spain. It is characterized by a caramelized surface and a creamy, custard-like interior, achieved by baking at high temperatures.

Alternative English names include cheesecake San Sebastián or burnt Basque cheesecake. In Spain, Basque cheesecake is referred to as tarta de queso de La Viña or a San Sebastián-style cheesecake, while the "burnt" descriptor is less commonly used locally.

== History ==
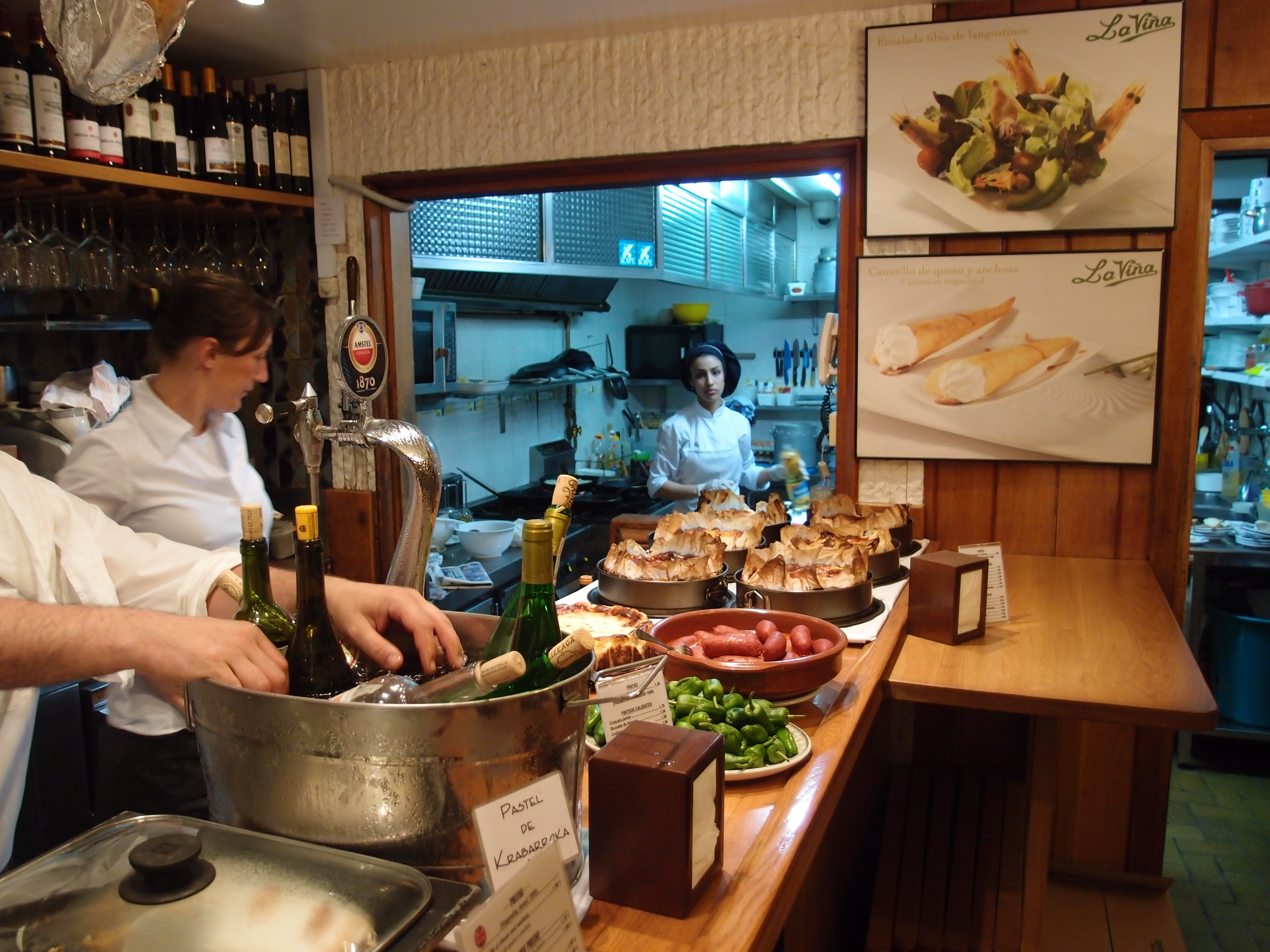
Bar La Viña in 2014

Basque cheesecake is typically baked at high temperatures, resulting in a caramelized surface and a creamy interior. It was created in 1988 by Santiago Rivera at his pintxo bar La Viña in San Sebastián, a coastal city in the Basque Country, Spain. It achieved popularity online in the 2010s, helped by a recipe published by the British food writer Nigella Lawson. By 2021, it had become widely shared on social media platforms such as Instagram and was described as "ubiquitous" in the United Kingdom. The New York Times listed it among its food trend predictions for 2021. The Spanish chef Nieves Barragán Mohacho, of the Michelin-starred London restaurant Sabor, serves hers with liquorice sauce.

Prior to the international popularity of the La Viña version, other cheesecakes gained recognition in the Basque culinary scene. The cheesecake served at the restaurant Zuberoa in Oiartzun, developed by the chef Hilario Arbelaitz, became particularly influential. This version typically incorporated blue cheese alongside other dairy products and was often prepared with a crust, differing in composition and structure from the later La Viña-style cheesecake.

As the La Viña-style cheesecake spread internationally, it became increasingly associated with a crustless format and a dark, caramelized surface. Spanish food writers have noted that this framing reflects an internationalized interpretation rather than a fixed or uniformly applied characteristic in its place of origin, where browning levels may vary.

== See also ==
- Basque cuisine
