= The Great British Bake Off series 6 =

Sixth series of The Great British Bake Off

The Great British Bake Off
- Series 6
- Presented by: Mel Giedroyc; Sue Perkins
- Judges: Mary Berry; Paul Hollywood
- No. of contestants: 12
- Winner: Nadiya Hussain
- Runners-up: Ian Cumming; Tamal Ray
- Location: Welford Park, Berkshire
- No. of max. bakes: 30
- No. of episodes: 10

Release
- Original network: BBC One
- Original release: 5 August – 7 October 2015

Series chronology
- ← Previous; Series 5 Next → Series 7

The sixth series (Season 3 on PBS, or Collection 3 on Netflix in the US) of The Great British Bake Off first aired on 5 August 2015, with twelve contestants competing to be the series 6 winner. Mel Giedroyc and Sue Perkins presented the show, and Mary Berry and Paul Hollywood returned as judges. The competition was held in the ground of Welford Park, Berkshire for a second year. The series was won by Nadiya Hussain, with Tamal Ray and Ian Cumming finishing as runners-up.

The sixth series was broadcast as the third season on PBS in the United States.

== Bakers ==
Baker	Age	Occupation	Hometown	Links
Alvin Magallanes	37	Nurse	Bracknell, Berkshire	
Dorret Conway	53	Accountant	Penwortham, Lancashire	
Flora Shedden	19	Art Gallery Assistant	Dunkeld, Perth and Kinross	
Ian Cumming	41	Travel Photographer	Great Wilbraham, Cambridgeshire	
Marie Campbell	66	Retired	Auchterarder, Perthshire	
Mat Riley	37	Firefighter	London	
Nadiya Hussain	30	Full-time Mother	Leeds / Luton	
Paul Jagger	49	Prison Governor	Swansea, Wales	
Sandy Docherty	49	Child Welfare Officer	Yeadon, West Yorkshire	
Stu Henshall	35	Professional Musician	Guildford, Surrey	
Tamal Ray	29	Trainee Anaesthetist	Manchester	
Ugnė Bubnaityte	32	PA and Administrator	Woodford, London / Vilkaviškis, Lithuania	

== Results summary ==
Elimination chart
Baker	1	2	3	4	5	6	7	8	9	10
Nadiya	HIGH	SAFE	SAFE	HIGH	SB	LOW	HIGH	SB	SB	WINNER
Ian	SAFE	SB	SB	SB	SAFE	SAFE	HIGH	SAFE	LOW	Runner-up
Tamal	HIGH	SAFE	SAFE	HIGH	SAFE	SAFE	SB	HIGH	HIGH	Runner-up
Flora	HIGH	SAFE	SAFE	SAFE	LOW	HIGH	SAFE	LOW	OUT	
Paul	SAFE	LOW	HIGH	LOW	HIGH	SAFE	LOW	OUT		
Mat	SAFE	HIGH	LOW	SAFE	SAFE	SB	OUT			
Alvin	SAFE	SAFE	HIGH	LOW	SAFE	OUT				
Ugnė	LOW	SAFE	SAFE	SAFE	OUT					
Sandy	SAFE	HIGH	SAFE	OUT						
Dorret	LOW	LOW	OUT							
Marie	SB	OUT								
Stu	OUT									

Colour key:

Baker was the series winner.
Baker was the Star Baker.
Baker was a series runner-up.
Baker was one of the judges' favourite bakers that week, but was not the Star Baker.
Baker got through to the next round.
Baker was one of the judges' least favourite bakers that week, but was not eliminated.
Baker was eliminated.

== Episodes ==
Colour key:

Baker was eliminated at conclusion of episode
Baker was named "Star Baker" at conclusion of episode
Baker was named runner-up for the series
Baker won series

=== Episode 1: Cakes ===
For the first signature challenge, the bakers were given 2 hours to make a Madeira Cake, which was chosen as an "easy" challenge for the bakers. The cake should have a dome and a crack on top, though Mary stated the cake should not differ too far from the original. For the technical challenge, the bakers had 1 hour and 45 minutes to make Mary Berry's recipe for a Walnut Cake, which should have three layers, a meringue coating, and caramelised walnuts. For the showstopper, challenge the bakers had 3 1/2 hours to make a Black Forest Gâteau. The bakers were tasked with making a cake that should be extravagant and should "impress" Mary and Paul.

Baker	Signature (Madeira Cake)	Technical (Walnut Cake)	Showstopper (Black Forest Gâteau)	Result
Alvin	Orange Vanilla and Fig Madeira Cake	2nd	Black Forest Gateau	Safe
Dorret	Madeira Cake with Candied Lemons	5th	Enchanted Forest Gateau	Safe
Flora	Blood Orange Madeira Cake	6th	Black Forest Gateau	Safe
Ian	Somewhere West of Madeira Cake	8th	Black Forest Cherry Tree	Safe
Marie	Zingy Citrus Madeira Cake	3rd	A Walk in the Black Forest	Star Baker
Mat	Gin and Tonic Madeira Cake	7th	Black Forest Gateau	Safe
Nadiya	Orange and Green Cardamom Madeira Cake	12th	Quadruple Chocolate Black Forest Gateau	Safe
Paul	Lemon, Ginger and Caraway Seed Madeira Cake	10th	Black Forest Chocolate Creation	Safe
Sandy	Madeira Cake with Almond Liqueur and Chopped Apricots	9th	Black Forest Gateau	Safe
Stu	Marley Madeira Cake	11th	Purple Forest Gateau	Eliminated
Tamal	Pistachio and Rose Madeira Cake	4th	Black Forest Gateau in a Chocolate Shell	Safe
Ugnė	Lemon and Thyme Madeira Cake	1st	Falling Cup Gateau	Safe

=== Episode 2: Biscuits ===
For the signature challenge, the bakers were given 2 hours to bake 24 identical biscotti of any shape, flavour or size. In the technical challenge, they were required to make 8 arlettes, which are high-end light delicate cinnamon-flavoured biscuits, in 2 1/2 hours. For the show stopper, they were set the challenge of making 36 biscuits to be presented in a biscuit box made of a different kind of biscuit mix. They were given 4 hours in this challenge.

Baker	Signature (24 Biscotti)	Technical (8 Arlettes)	Showstopper (36 Biscuits and an Edible Biscuit Box)	Result
Alvin	Jackfruit, Pistachio and Macadamia Biscotti	6th	Gingerbread Box filled with Brandy Snaps	Safe
Dorret	Almond and Apricot Biscotti with Amber Sugar Crystals	1st	Box of Frogs	Safe
Flora	Wedding Biscotti	2nd	Honey and Earl Grey Tea Box	Safe
Ian	Orange, Rosemary and Almond Biscotti	3rd	Sandwich de la Confiture	Star Baker
Marie	Biscotti Italiano	11th	Russian Box	Eliminated
Mat	Pistachio, Cranberry and White Chocolate Biscotti	5th	Gingerbread Fire Engine	Safe
Nadiya	Coconut, Fennel and Pistachio Biscotti	9th	Box of Fortunes	Safe
Paul	Chocolate, Hazelnut and Fig Biscotti	10th	Memory Box	Safe
Sandy	Chocolate Chunk and Hazelnut Biscotti	4th	Sundried Tomato Cheese Biscuit Box	Safe
Tamal	Cinnamon, Maple and Cranberry Biscotti	8th	Chessboard Box	Safe
Ugnė	White Wine Biscotti	7th	Baby Climbing into the Cookie Box	Safe

=== Episode 3: Bread ===
In their signature challenge, the bakers were given 1 1/2 hour to make 2 quick breads to be made free-form (i.e. not in a tin). For the technical challenge, Paul set the bakers the challenge of baking 4 identical crusty baguettes in 2 1/2 hours. For the showstopper challenge, the bakers needed to make a 3D bread sculpture in 5 hours, using three types of dough, and one of them should be filled.

Baker	Signature (2 Quick Breads)	Technical (4 Baguettes)	Showstopper (3D Bread Sculpture)	Result
Alvin	Prosciutto, Manchego and Balsamic Onion Soda Breads	4th	Cornucopia	Safe
Dorret	Walnut and Stilton Soda Breads	6th	Unmade Bread	Eliminated
Flora	Fig and Hazelnut Rye Breads	2nd	Herb Couture	Safe
Ian	Wild Garlic Pesto Soda Breads	1st	Flour Power	Star Baker
Mat	Jalapeño, Mexican Cheddar and Smoked Salt Soda Breads	8th	Curry Inspired Brighton Pavilion	Safe
Nadiya	Mexican Bread with Warm Tomato Salsa	9th	Snake Charmer's Basket	Safe
Paul	Cranberry and Orange Sweet Soda Breads	10th	King of the Jungle (Note: Received the first ever special commendation for his showstopper)	Safe
Sandy	Soda Breads with Smoked Bacon and Onion	7th	Basket of Bread Flowers with a Walnut and Blue Cheese Centre	Safe
Tamal	Fig, Cheese and Walnut Breads	3rd	Breadcycle	Safe
Ugnė	Chocolate Quick Breads with Salted Caramel Sauce	5th	Easter Basket	Safe

=== Episode 4: Desserts ===
For the signature challenge, the bakers had 2 hours to make 12 crème brûlées. The brief specified that the custard must be set and that the bakers were not allowed to use a blowtorch to caramelize the top. For the technical challenge, the bakers had 4 hours to make a Spanische Windtorte. This dessert had two types of meringue, Swiss and French, designed into a circular box and filled with cream and fruit. Three tiers of sweet cheesecakes were set as the showstopper. The structure must be self-standing, have unique flavors and be completed in 4 1/2 hours.

Baker	Signature (12 Crème Brûlées)	Technical (Spanische Windtorte)	Showstopper (Three-Tiered Cheesecake)	Result
Alvin	Blackberry Crème Brûlées	9th	Tower of Fruits Cheesecakes	Safe
Flora	Rhubarb and Ginger Crème Brûlées	3rd	Elderflower and Granola Cheesecakes	Safe
Ian	Pomegranate Two Ways Crème Brûlées	4th	Trio of Spicy and Herby Baked Cheesecakes	Star Baker
Mat	Coconut Crème Brûlées	7th	Chocolate Bar Cheesecakes	Safe
Nadiya	Cinnamon Tea Crème Brûlées	8th	Fizzy Pop Cheesecakes	Safe
Paul	Almond Crème Brûlées	1st	Berry Cheesecake Tower	Safe
Sandy	Pontefract Crème Brûlées	6th	Cassata, Whisky and Orange & Apple Pie Cheesecakes	Eliminated
Tamal	Rhubarb and Ginger Crème Brûlées	5th	Mango, Hazelnut and Rosemary Cheesecake Trio	Safe
Ugnė	Marula Fruit and Coffee Liqueur Crème Brûlées	2nd	Lime, Coconut and Hazelnut Cheesecakes	Safe

=== Episode 5: Alternative Ingredients ===
This episode has a theme of using alternatives for ingredients usually used in baking. For the signature bake, the bakers were given the challenge of baking a cake, but without using sugar. They were given 2 1/2 hour for the bake. For the technical bake, the challenge was to make 12 identical gluten-free pita breads in 2 hours. In the showstopper, the bakers needed to make an ice-cream roll using dairy-free ice-cream. They were given 4 1/2 hours for the bake.

Baker	Signature (Sugar-Free Cake)	Technical (12 Gluten-Free Pita Bread)	Showstopper (Dairy-Free Ice-Cream Roll)	Result
Alvin	Pineapple Upside Down Cake	8th	Buko Pandan, Mango and Passion Fruit Ice Cream Roll	Safe
Flora	Pistachio, Apple and Cardamom Madeleine Cake	3rd	Chocolate and Pear Bûche	Safe
Ian	Honey and Flowers Cake	5th	Dessert Island	Safe
Mat	Sugar Free Carrot Cake	4th	Raspberry & Coconut Ice Cream Roll	Safe
Nadiya	Naked Blueberry and Caraway Crunch Cake	1st	Chocolate and Strawberry Lime Ice Cream Roll	Star Baker
Paul	Carrot & Pecan Cake	2nd	Dessert Island Getaway	Safe
Tamal	Honey and Grapefruit Polenta Cake	7th	Passion Fruit and Pineapple Ice Cream Roll	Safe
Ugnė	Chocolate and Hazelnut Sugar-Free Cake	6th	Chocolate, Peanut Butter and Grape Jam Roll	Eliminated

=== Episode 6: Pastry ===
For this week's signature challenge, the bakers had to make a Frangipane tart in 2 hours with the brief being that it must be open-topped and must be shortcrust pastry. In the technical, the bakers had to make 12 Flaounes, a cheese filled pastry made in Cyprus. They had 2 hours. Vol-au-vents were set as the Showstopper – the bakers had to make 2 types, all using their own puff pastry – in 3 hours and 45 minutes.

Baker	Signature (Frangipane Tart)	Technical (12 Flaounes)	Showstopper (48 Vol-au-vents)	Result
Alvin	Plum Frangipane Tart	6th	Smoked Salmon En Croûte and Vermouth Chicken à la King vol-au-vents	Eliminated
Flora	Apricot and Rosemary Frangipane Tart	2nd	Asparagus and Parma Ham and Praline and Chocolate vol-au-vents	Safe
Ian	Pear and Raspberry Frangipane Tart	3rd	vol-au-vents Terre et Mer	Safe
Mat	Piña Colada Frangipane Tart	1st	His 'n' Hers vol-au-vents	Star Baker
Nadiya	Bay Leaf, Rong Tea and Pear Tart	4th	Bengali Korma and Clementine with Cod vol-au-vents	Safe
Paul	Christmas Frangipane Tart	5th	Savoury and Sweet Bouchées	Safe
Tamal	Spiced Pear Frangipane Tart	7th	Fennel and Rosemary Pulled Pork and Chicken and Coriander vol-au-vents	Safe

=== Episode 7: Victorian ===
For the first challenge, the bakers had 3 hours to make a raised game pie. The pie must have thin hot water crust pastry and must be very ornate, as most game pies from the era were. For the technical challenge, a tennis fruit cake was set for the bakers. The bakers were given 3 hours to make a fruit cake, with royal icing, sugar paste, and gelatine. A Charlotte Russe was set as the showstopper. To be done in 5 1/2 hours, the bake usually has ladyfingers around jelly and a sponge – with flavour and decoration being key.

Baker	Signature (Raised Game Pie)	Technical (Tennis Cake)	Showstopper (Charlotte Russe)	Result
Flora	Game Pie with Shallot and Apple Chutney	4th	Raspberry, Pomegranate and Champagne Charlotte Russe	Safe
Ian	Roadkill Pie	5th	Victoria's Crown Charlotte Russe	Safe
Mat	Raised Venison and Pigeon Pie	6th	Strawberry Charlotte Russe	Eliminated
Nadiya	Aromatic Raised Game Pie	1st	Mango and Raspberry Charlotte Russe	Safe
Paul	Not a Boaring Pie	2nd	Charlotte Rose	Safe
Tamal	Middle Eastern Game Pie	3rd	Spiced Blackberry, Raspberry and Cardamom Charlotte Russe	Star Baker

=== Episode 8: Pâtisserie (Quarterfinals) ===
In the first quarter-final challenge, the bakers had to make 24 cream horns, 12 of each flavour, using either puff, rough puff or flaky pastry, in 3 1/2 hours. Mary Berry's recipe for 9 mokatines was set as the technical challenge. They are small, delicate genoise sponges filled with a coffee buttercream that are meant to be attractive, as if "in a pâtisserie window", and only had 2 hours. Religieuse à l'ancienne were set as the showstopper challenge. They are large éclairs, stood upright with no dowelling, and decorated with buttercream. They were given 4 hours. Although the towers were left to stand for two hours after the challenge as traditional religieuse would have been left for such time, some of the towers began to collapse or lean upon being presented to Mary and Paul.

Baker	Signature (24 Cream Horns)	Technical (9 Mokatines)	Showstopper (Religieuse à l'ancienne)	Result
Flora	Peach & Lemon Thyme and Smoked Almond & Butterscotch Cream Horns	3rd	Lime & Basil and Coconut & White Chocolate Religieuse à l'ancienne	Safe
Ian	Mont Blanc & Black Forest Gâteau Horns	2nd	Nun with Hidden Passions	Safe
Nadiya	Rose Pistachio and Mocha Hazelnut Horns	1st	Bubble Gum and Peppermint Cream Religieuse à l'ancienne	Star Baker
Paul	Café Tipple & Banana Crunch-away Horns	5th	Religieuse à l'ancienne	Eliminated
Tamal	Lime & Mascarpone and Malt Cream Horns	4th	Passionfruit & Mango and Pistachio & Raspberry Religieuse à l'ancienne	Safe

=== Episode 9: Chocolate (Semifinals) ===
For their signature challenge, the bakers had 2 1/2 hours to make a chocolate tart. The tart had to be ornate, intricate, and full of flavour. For the technical challenge, the bakers faced a staggered start, and were each given 1 hour and 15 minutes to make a chocolate soufflé – with Flora starting first, followed by Ian, Nadiya, and Tamal. A chocolate centrepiece was set as the showstopper. In 4 hours, the bakers had to create an ornate centrepiece using white chocolate in some form and including a biscuit element, the centrepiece having to be free-standing and attractive.

Baker	Signature (Chocolate Tart)	Technical (Chocolate Soufflé)	Showstopper (Chocolate Centrepieces)	Result
Flora	Passion Fruit and Chocolate Tart	1st	Cocoa Carousel	Eliminated (Note: Flora's elimination meant that she was the first baker to have finished first in the technical challenge and be eliminated the same week)
Ian	Chocolate and Bay Tart	3rd	Chocolate Well	Safe
Nadiya	Peanut Salted Caramel and Chocolate Tart	4th	Peacock in Nan's Door	Star Baker
Tamal	Chocolate New York Pie	2nd	Chocolate Bell Tower	Safe

=== Episode 10: Final ===
In the final signature challenge, the bakers had to make 16 iced buns, of which there must be 2 kinds, in 3 hours. In the technical challenge, the judges decided to use one of Paul Hollywood's recipes; the bakers had to bake 6 raspberry-flavoured mille-feuille with fondant icing in 2 hours. The recipe involved pastry – something all of the bakers had struggled with in Week Six. In the final showstopper, the bakers were given 4 hours to make a classic British cake in a minimum three-layered presentation.

Baker	Signature (16 Iced Buns)	Technical (6 Mille-Feuille)	Showstopper (Classic British Cake)	Result
Ian	Elderflower and Lemon & Spiced Buns	2nd	Colossal Curvy Carrot Cake	Runner-up
Nadiya	Cardamom and Almond Buns & Nutmeg and Sour Cherry Fingers	1st	My Big Fat British Wedding Cake	Winner
Tamal	Cinnamon and Apple & Toffee and Marmalade Iced Buns	3rd	Sticky Toffee Pudding Cake	Runner-up

=== Masterclasses ===
Mary and Paul show how to bake some of their favourite recipes and technical challenges.

==== Episode 1 ====
	Bake 1	Bake 2	Bake 3
Mary	Madeira Cake	Walnut Cake	Black Forest Gâteau
Paul	Hazelnut and Orange Biscotti	Arlettes	—N/a

==== Episode 2 ====
	Bake 1	Bake 2	Bake 3
Mary	Cappuccino Crème Brûlée	Spanische Windtorte	White Chocolate and Raspberry Cheesecake
Paul	Soda Bread	Baguettes	—N/a

==== Episode 3 ====
	Bake 1	Bake 2	Bake 3
Mary	Sugar Free Carrot Cake	Apricot Frangipane Tart	—N/a
Paul	Flaounes	Raised Game Pie	Lime and Passionfruit Charlotte Russe

==== Episode 4 ====
	Bake 1	Bake 2
Mary	Tennis Cake	Mokatines
Paul	Cream Horns	Religieuse a l'Ancienne

==== Christmas special ====
	Bake 1	Bake 2	Bake 3
Mary	Christmas Pavlova	Christmas Trifle	Rosace à l’Orange
Paul	Christmas Chelsea Buns	Turkey and Ham Pie	Pandoro

== Controversies ==
=== Betting ===
As the show was pre-recorded, the winner of the show would have been known by those involved in the show. Bookmaker Ladbrokes halted betting on the show after "a run of bets" was placed for one contestant, many at shops in the Ipswich area.

It was also claimed that dozens of employees of BBC as well as the production company, Love Productions, had opened gambling accounts to place bets on the eventual winner.

=== Spoilers ===
In a BBC Radio 2 broadcast, judge Mary Berry accidentally revealed the eliminated contestant prior to the airing of episode three.

=== Contestants ===
Contestant Marie Campbell, who was the first Star Baker of the series, was criticised for being "semi-professional", after it emerged that she had been trained in Ecole Escoffier at the Ritz in Paris where she specialised in patisserie. A statement from the BBC said: "There are strict criteria to take part in the show and Marie met those criteria. She gained a certificate for one week’s training in Paris in 1984, more than 10 years ago. She has not worked professionally as a baker or chef."

== Post-show career ==
Nadiya Hussain regularly appears on The One Show on BBC1. Her own cookery show, The Chronicles of Nadiya started on 24 August 2016 on BBC One. Hussain writes a weekly column for The Times Magazine, a part of the Saturday supplement of The Times, as well as a monthly column in Essentials magazine. Her recipes have also appeared in BBC's Good Food magazine.

Hussain was signed by UK publisher Michael Joseph, part of Penguin Random House, for her debut book Nadiya's Kitchen, which is a collection of the recipes that she cooks for friends and family. Hussain has written a children's book of stories and recipes, Bake Me A Story, due to be published by Hodder Children's Books, which blends updated versions of fairytales (poor "Sleepless Beauty" just needs a nice cup of cardamom-infused hot chocolate to break her curse; resourceful Jack wins the giant over with yummy bean patties) with colourful illustrations and child-friendly recipes. She is also writing three contemporary women's fiction novels for Harlequin.

Tamal Ray writes a monthly column for The Guardian. He presented a television show on health on Channel 4 titled Be Your Own Doctor. He also participated in the 2018 rendition of The Great New Year's Bake Off.

Flora Shedden studied for a year at the University of Edinburgh but deferred on a course on art history at the University of St Andrews for a year to concentrate on writing a cookbook, Gatherings, published in January 2017. She wrote a column on baking for The Scotsman.

In 2017, Paul Jagger and Sandy Docherty participated in the year's renditions of The Great Christmas Bake Off and The Great New Year's Bake Off respectively, with the former also winning the special's star baker.

== Ratings ==
According to the overnight ratings, the opening episode of the series 6 of Bake Off was watched by 9.3 million viewers, a rise of over 2 million from the previous year. The final was watched by an overnight audience of 13.4 million viewers peaking at 14.5, the highest overnight total of 2015. The list of ten most-watched television programmes of 2015 was also dominated by The Great British Bake Off, with seven of the year's ten being episodes of The Great British Bake Off. During the entire length of the series, no national programme on any of the episodes was higher rated than Bake Off.

Official episode viewing figures are from BARB.

Episode no.	Airdate	7 day viewers (millions)	28 day viewers (millions)	BBC One weekly ranking	Weekly ranking all channels	BBC iPlayer requests
1	5 August 2015	11.62	11.73	1		2,063,000
2	12 August 2015	11.59	11.84	1		1,977,000
3	19 August 2015	12.01	N/A	1		1,760,000
4	26 August 2015	12.36	12.67	1		1,539,000
5	2 September 2015	12.39	12.63	1		1,930,000
6	9 September 2015	12.00	12.26	1		1,869,000
7	16 September 2015	12.35	12.58	1		1,841,000
8	23 September 2015	11.09	11.35	1		1,748,000
9	30 September 2015	12.65	12.78	1		1,370,000
10	7 October 2015	15.05	15.16	1		1,619,000

=== Specials ===
The Great British Bake Off, Class of 2014
Episode no.	Airdate	7 day Viewers (millions)	BBC Two weekly ranking
	4 October 2015	N/A	N/A

The Great British Bake Off Masterclass
Episode no.	Airdate	7 day Viewers (millions)	BBC Two weekly ranking
1	12 October 2015	2.55	2
2	16 October 2015	1.74	18
3	19 October 2015	1.83	12
4	23 October 2015	1.41	29

The Great British Bake Off, Christmas Masterclass
Episode no.	Airdate	7 day Viewers (millions)	BBC Two weekly ranking
	17 December 2015	2.21	11
