= The Confectional =

Bakery in Seattle, Washington, U.S.

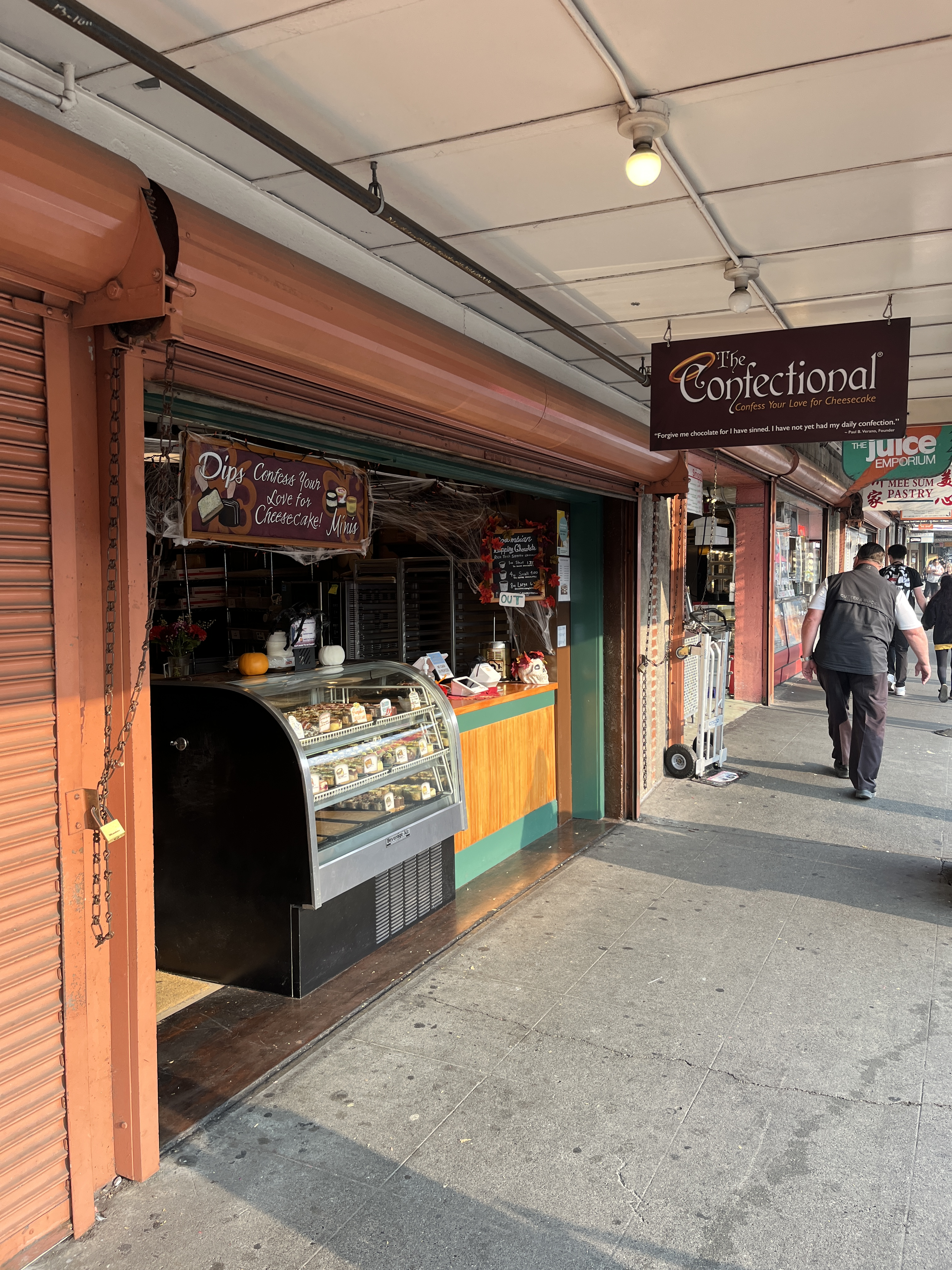
- The shop at Pike Place Market, 2022
- Interactive map of The Confectional

Restaurant information
- Location: 1530 Pike Place, Seattle, King, Washington, 98101, United States
- Coordinates: 47.6093°N 122.3414°W
- Website: theconfectional.com

The Confectional is a bakery and cheesecake company with multiple locations in Seattle, in the U.S. state of Washington. The original shop is located at Pike Place Market in the city's Central Waterfront district. Subsequent locations opened on Capitol Hill in 2011 and at the Armory in Seattle Center.

== Description ==
The Confectional is a bakery and cheesecake company with multiple locations in Seattle. The original shop is located in Pike Place Market's Silver Okum Building, in the Central Waterfront district; the business has also operated on Capitol Hill and at Seattle Center. The Confectional sells cheesecakes; varieties have included caramel, chocolate, passion fruit, pumpkin, and raspberry white chocolate. According to the Food Network, the Quadruple Chocolate Cheesecake has "a cocoa-laced cookie crust, silky cheesecake batter and three varieties of chocolate buttons [that] are layered together". The menu has also included cheesecake truffles and Colombian hot chocolate with coffee, cinnamon, and clove. The shop at Pike Place Market does not offer seating.

== History ==
Co-owners Paul Verano and Destiny Sund opened the original shop in 2006.

The business was featured on the Cooking Channel's series Unique Sweets in 2011. A second, larger location also opened on Capitol Hill in 2011.

In 2012, owners announced plans to open a third location at the Armory at Seattle Center. In 2013, the business was highlighted on The View, in Whoopi Goldberg's overview of some of "her favorite things".

== Reception ==
Frommer's has said, "If cheesecake is your vice, head to The Confectional ... which specializes in individual cheesecakes. Just don't expect me to absolve you of your weight gain." In Cheap Bastard's Guide to Seattle (2013), David Volk wrote, "If you're really lucky, you might be here on a day when someone makes a mistake on a cheesecake that turns into a factory second ripe for sampling. If not, well, you can always try a sip of Colombian drinking chocolate." Chona Kasinger included the Raspberry White Chocolate Cheesecake in a 2016 list of "Seattle's 4 Best White Chocolate Desserts". In 2021, Rebekah Gonzalez said The Confectional was Seattle's best bakery for cheesecake based on Yelp ratings and reviews.

== See also ==
- List of bakeries
- List of restaurants in Pike Place Market
