= Brossat =

Type of cheese from Catalonia, Spain

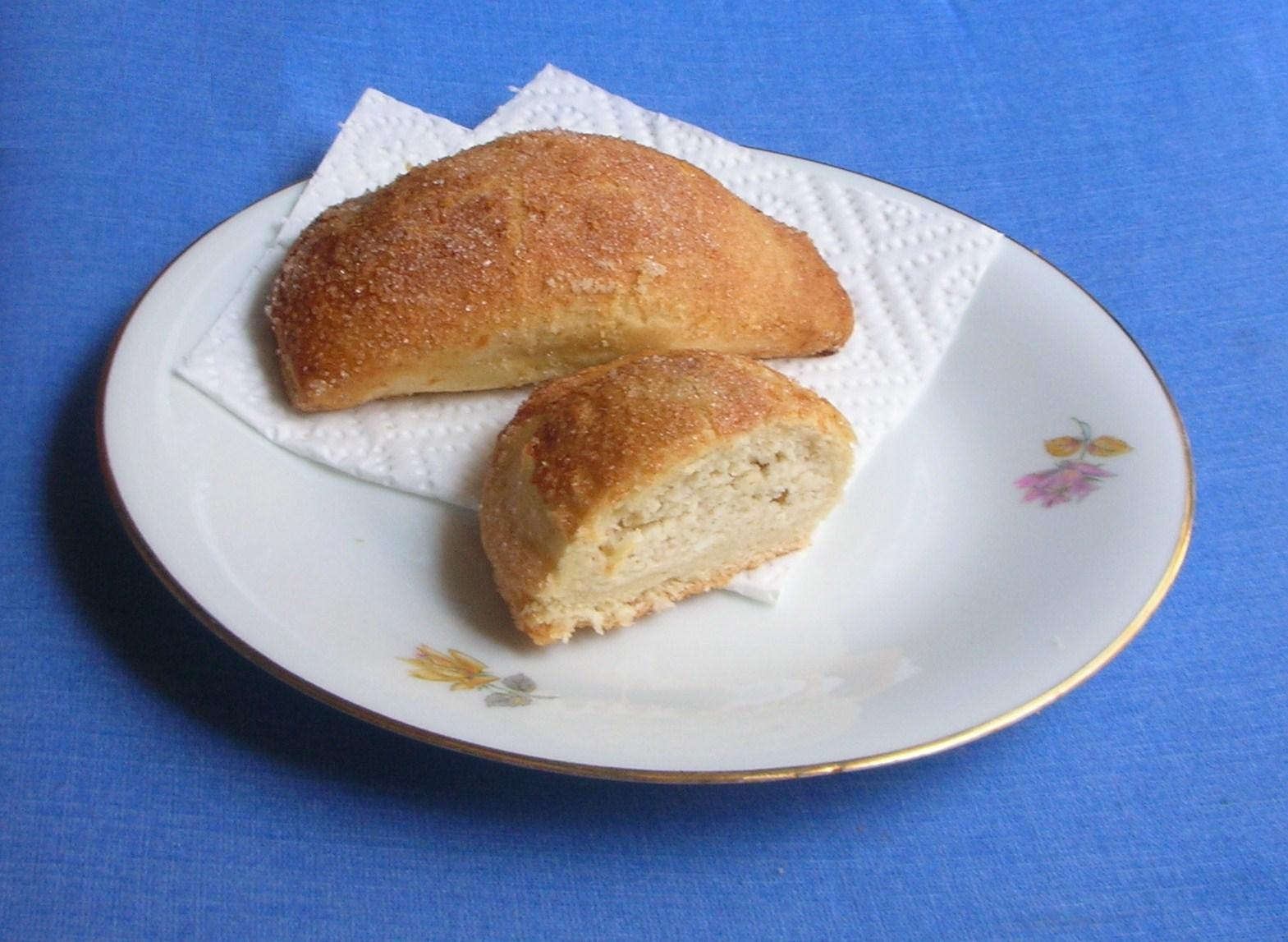
"Flaons of Morella" pastries stuffed with brossat

Brossat, or brull in some zones, is a fresh cheese in Catalan cuisine made from whey (xerigot) resulting from the making of other cheeses, such as mató, a fresh or aged cheese, from sheep or goats.

It's made by heating the whey until the temperatures is almost but not quite boiling, when the insoluble milk proteins and other particles precipitate and can be collected in shape of white flocculi on the surface of the whey. It is not pressed, nor salted or aged, but is shaped with molds or cloths.

It is a cheese with very little fat (around 10%) and high in protein.

== Etymology ==
This product is called brossat in the Pyrenees, Menorca and Mallorca. It's known and marketed as brull, in the mountainous spurs of the Ports de Tortosa-Beseit, to the south of Terres de l'Ebre and in Alt Maestrat. This brull is used to stuff the flaó pastries of Morella.

== Variants ==
Brossat-like varieties are made in other Mediterranean countries, for example in Occitania it is known as brousse, in Avairon it is called recuite, in Corsica it is called brocciu, and in Italy it is called ricotta. They also have serac in Switzerland or urda in Romania.
