= Cheesecake =

Cheese-based dessert

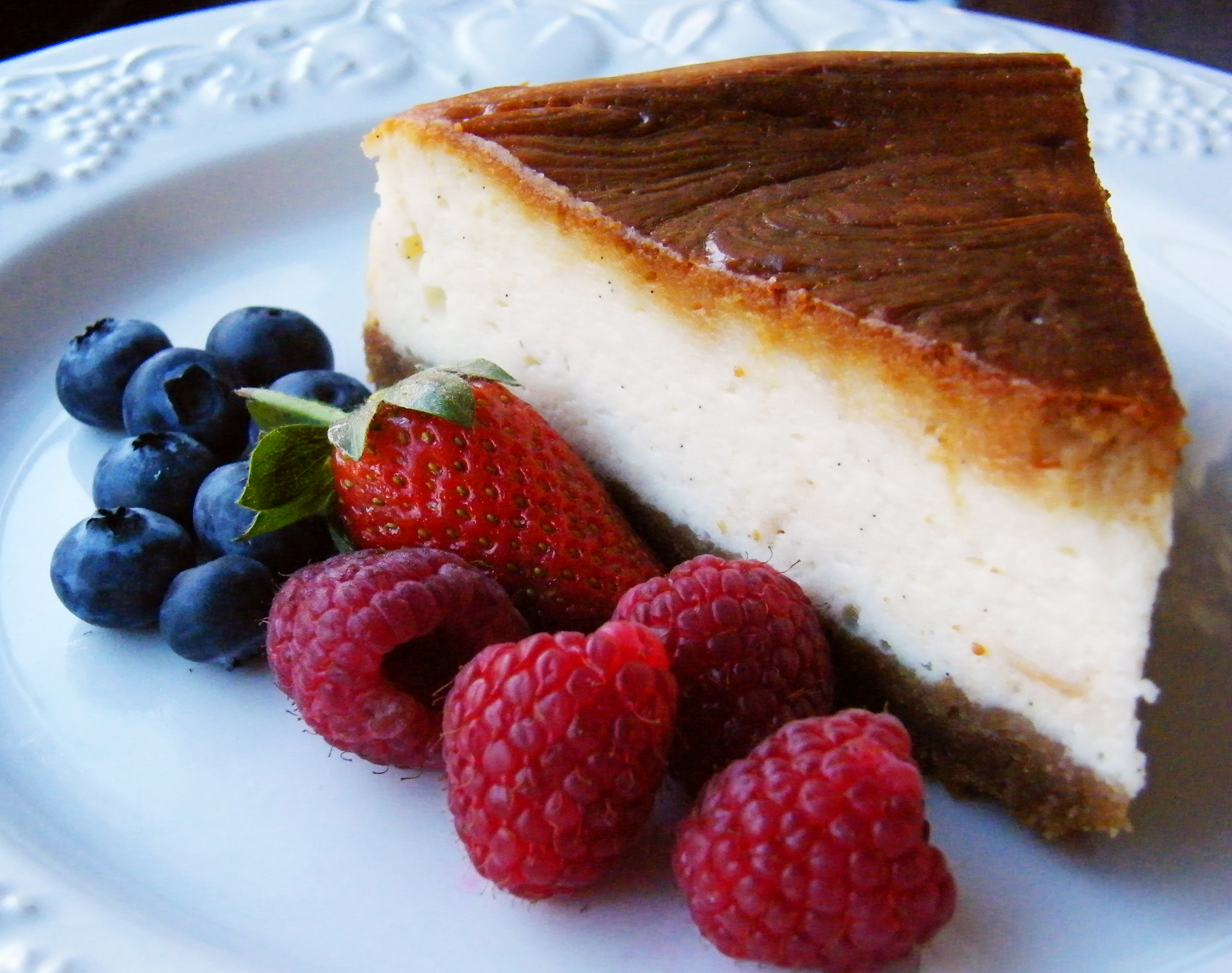
- New York–style cheesecake with fruit
- Type: Tart
- Course: Dessert (predominantly) Savoury (eg. smoked salmon cheesecake)
- Place of origin: Ancient Greece
- Main ingredients: Cream cheese, sugar, crust or base (graham cracker crust, pastry, or sponge cake)

Cheesecake is a tart dessert made with a soft fresh cheese (typically cottage cheese, cream cheese, mascarpone, quark, or ricotta), and sugar, with either eggs or cream depending if it is to be baked or not. It may have a crust or base made from crushed cookies, digestive biscuits, graham crackers, pastry, or sometimes sponge cake. Cheesecake is known for its rich, creamy flavor and smooth texture. It may be baked or unbaked and is usually served chilled. A cheesecake is classed a tart or pie and is not a cake.

Cheesecake dates back to ancient Greece, and evolved into the modern form around the 18th century. There are many regional variations of cheesecake.

Vanilla, spices, lemon, chocolate, pumpkin, or other flavors may be added to the main cheese layer. Additional flavors and visual appeal may be added by topping the finished dessert with fruit, whipped cream, nuts, cookies, fruit sauce, chocolate syrup, or other ingredients.

== History ==
=== Early cheesecakes ===
==== Ancient Greece ====
Although its exact origin is uncertain, cheesecake is reputed to have originated in Ancient Greece, where cakes containing cheese were served to athletes in the first Olympic Games in 776 BC. Athenaeus lists a wide range of cheese-filled cakes in the Deipnosophists. He also reports that Callimachus, in his List of Various Books, mentions four now-lost treaties on the Art of Making Cheesecakes, written by Aegimius, Hegesippus, Metrobius, and Phaetus.

The Ancient Greeks enjoyed plakous, a layered cake first mentioned about 350 BCE by two Greek poets. According to the gastronomic poet Archestratos, plakous was a popular delicacy served at the end of the meal alongside dried fruits and nuts, and praises that the cake was made in Athens for being soaked in Attic honey from Mount Hymettos. His contemporary, the comic poet Antiphanes, notes the other two main ingredients, goat cheese and wheat flour. Two centuries later, in Italy, Cato the Elder gives an extant recipe for placenta, the same name translated into Latin.

Ancient Greek religious rituals often offered cakes to Greek gods as a non-violent alternative to animal sacrifice. Surviving historical records have preserved the names of several offertory cakes, though specific recipes remain scarce. Notably, the amphiphon was a cheesecake, decorated with lighted candles, offered to Artemis during the full moon of the month of Mounychion. Another cheese-based offertory cake included the phthoeis, also called selene ("moon"), which was round, white, and filled with cheese, wheat flour, and honey. Romans also offered cakes to their deities, including placenta and savillum. The most prevalent of these sacrificial cakes was the libum, for which Cato documented its recipe in his On Agriculture consisting of cheese, flour (wheat or durum), and an egg. which were all mixed, shaped into a large cake, and baked over bay leaves.

==== England ====
Cheesecakes made with soft cheese were recorded in England as early as 1265, when the account books of the Countess of Leicester listed "cheese for tarts". However, the earliest recipe that has been found didn't appear until 1390, in the first English cookbook Forme of Cury, featuring a baked pastry shell called Tart de Bry filled with cheese, egg yolks, sugar, salt, ginger, and saffron. Another similar recipe included nessh (a soft, fresh curd cheese), whole eggs and butter, but no saffron or ginger. A more modern recipe from the cookbook is Sambocade, which involves lining a baking dish with pastry crust, mixing strained and dried cheese curds with breadcrumbs, sugar, eggs, and elderflower, then drizzling rosewater over the cheesecake after being completely baked. On this basis, the English chef Heston Blumenthal argues that cheesecake is an English invention. Because the recipe does not specify an amount of sugar and due to the ingredient's rarity in 14th century England, the food historian Janet Clarkson gives a different perspective, writing "it seems reasonable to assume" that sambocade would be closer to the modern quiche than cheesecake.

Hannah Wolley gives a more modern cheesecake recipe in her Queenlike Closet in 1664, which includes currants and rose water:

Take four gallons of new milk, set it with a little runnet, and when it is come, break it gently, and whey it very well, then take some manchet, first scalded well in new milk, let the milk be thick with it, and while it is hot, put in a quarter of a pound of fresh butter, and stir it in, when it is cold, mix that and your curd together very well, then put in one pound and half of plumped currans, some beaten spice, a very little salt, rosewater, and the yolks of eight eggs, half a pint of cream, and a little sugar, mix them well together, then make some paste, with flower, butter, the yolk of an egg and fair water, and roul it out thin, and so bake them in bake-pans, and do not let them stand too long in the oven.

Cheese tarts were regarded as luxury foods and were popular at medieval summers feasts and fairs.

The English name cheesecake emerged in the 15th century, and the cheesecake did not evolve into its modern form until somewhere around the 18th century. In the early 17th century, foods known as cheesecakes typically had cheese curds, eggs and spices as their base. The food historian C. Anne Wilson describes these as "spiced cheese tarts". By the middle of the century, some recipes for these had lost their cheese altogether, including a mixture of eggs, clotted cream, flour and butter as a filling. Around the late 17th century the lemon cheesecake was created, and then the orange cheesecake. These were filled with fruit curd, and lacked cheese altogether. Dishes made under the name cheesecake without cheese continued into the 18th century. In the spring, as demand among calves for milk was greatest and the supply of curds was at its lowest, some cooks substituted dairy for ground rice and almond meal.

Around the 18th century, Europeans began removing yeast and adding beaten eggs to the cheesecake instead. With the overpowering yeast flavor gone, the result tasted more like a dessert treat. The early 19th-century cheesecake recipes in A New System of Domestic Cookery by Maria Rundell are made with cheese curd and fresh butter. One version is thickened with blanched almonds, eggs, and cream, and the cakes may have included currants, brandy, raisin wine, nutmeg, and orange flower water.

=== Modern cheesecakes ===
Modern commercial American cream cheese was developed in 1872, when William Lawrence, from Chester, New York, was searching for a way to recreate the soft, French cheese Neufchâtel. He discovered a way of making an "unripened cheese" that is heavier and creamier; other dairymen came up with similar creations independently.

Modern cheesecake comes in two different types. Along with the baked cheesecake, some cheesecakes are made with uncooked cream cheese on a crumbled-cookie or graham cracker base. This type of cheesecake was invented in the United States.

== Culinary classification ==
Making a crustless cheesecake (video)

Modern cheesecake is not usually classified as an actual "cake", despite the name (much like Boston cream "pie"). Some people classify baked cheesecake as a torte due to the usage of many eggs, which are the sole source of leavening, as a key factor. Others find compelling evidence that it is a custard pie, based on the overall structure, with the separate crust, the soft filling, and the absence of flour. Other sources identify it as a flan, or tart.

Smoked salmon cheesecake is a savoury form, containing smoked salmon. It is most frequently served as an appetizer or a buffet item. A smoked salmon cheesecake was a prize-winning recipe in 1996 in Better Homes and Gardens' Prize Tested Recipe Contest. The recipe called for the use of Swiss cheese along with the more usual (for cheesecakes) ricotta.

== National varieties ==
Cheesecakes can be broadly categorized into two basic types: baked and unbaked. Some do not have a crust or base. Cheesecake comes in a variety of styles based on region:

=== Africa ===
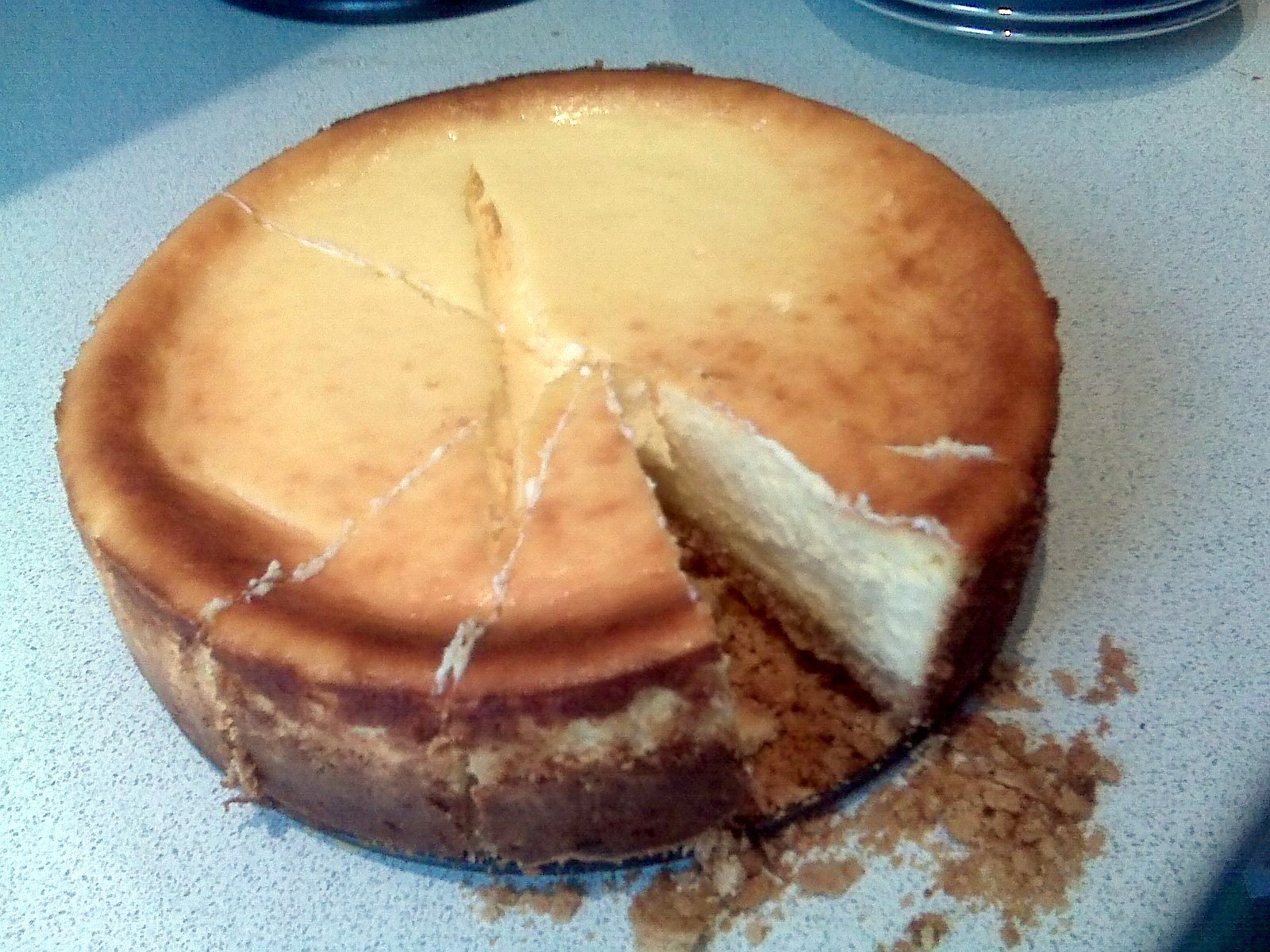
South African rose cheesecake

One popular variant of cheesecake in South Africa is made with whipped cream, cream cheese, gelatin for the filling, and a buttered digestive biscuit crust. It is not baked, and is sometimes made with Amarula liqueur. This variant is very similar to British cheesecake. This cheesecake is more common in British South African communities.

=== Asia ===
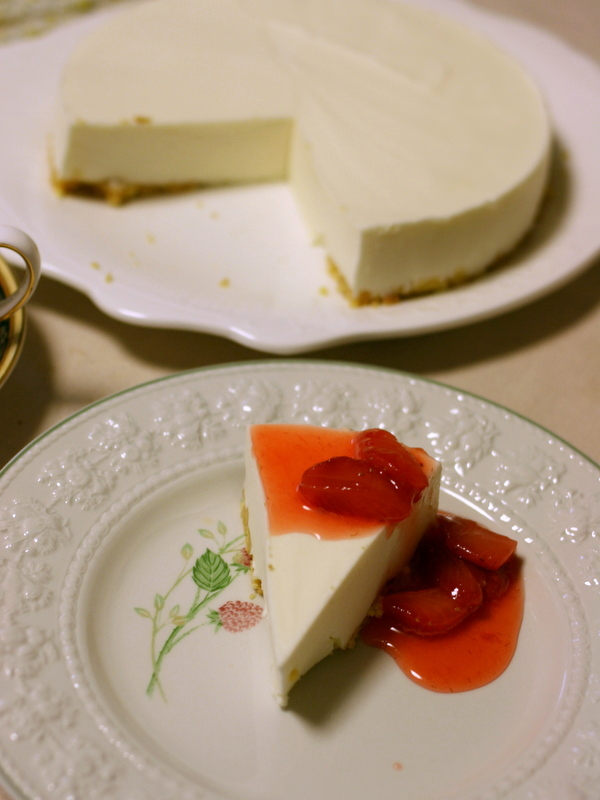
Japanese no-bake cheesecake (known in Japan as rare cheesecake), garnished with strawberry sauce

Japanese cheesecake (also known as soufflé-style or cotton cheesecake), is made with cream cheese, butter, sugar, and eggs, and has a characteristic wobbly and airy texture, similar to chiffon cake. No-bake cheesecakes are known as rare cheesecake (Japanese: レアチーズケーキ).

The most prominent version of cheesecake in the Philippines is ube cheesecake. It is made with a base of crushed graham crackers and an upper layer of cream cheese and ube halaya (mashed purple yam with milk, sugar, and butter). It can be prepared, baked, or simply refrigerated. Like other ube desserts in the Philippines, it is characteristically purple in color.

=== Europe ===
Basque cheesecake, composed of burnt custard and no crust, was created in 1990 by Santiago Rivera of the La Viña restaurant in the Basque Country, Spain. It achieved popularity online in the 2010s, helped by a recipe published by the British food writer Nigella Lawson. The Spanish chef Nieves Barragán Mohacho serves hers with a liquorice sauce, which Lawson included in her recipe. In 2021, Basque cheesecake was widely shared on Instagram and became "ubiquitous" in the UK. In 2023, the British restaurant critic Jay Rayner complained that Basque cheesecake had become overabundant in London.

Crostata di ricotta is a traditional Italian baked cheesecake made with ricotta cheese, chocolate chips, and eggs. Many cakes and desserts are filled with ricotta, like cassata Siciliana and pastiera Napoletana.

Swiss Chäschüechli (ramequin in French-speaking parts of the country) are small cheesecake tartlets, savory rather than sweet.

Sernik, with ser meaning "cheese", is a baked Polish cheesecake dating back to the 17th century. It uses twaróg (traditional Polish quark) and is based more on eggs and butter, without cream or sour cream. Variations include sernik krakowski (Kraków-style), with a lattice crust on top, królewski (royal), made from cocoa crust on the top and bottom of the cheesecake filling, and wiedeński (Vienna-style), which is crustless.

Russischer Zupfkuchen (Russian "pulled" cake) is a German baked cheesecake with a cocoa crust base and edge, with chocolate dough scattered over the cheesecake filling.

A nutritional survey of cheesecake served in restaurants and hotels in Northern Ireland found that the portion sizes were large, with larger servings containing more sugar, fat, saturated fat, energy and salt. The average serving of cheesecake was estimated to contain the equivalent of 5.5 cubes of sugar and 10% of the maximum guideline daily amount of salt.

Cottage cheese zapekanka (East Slavic cuisine).

European style cheesecakes

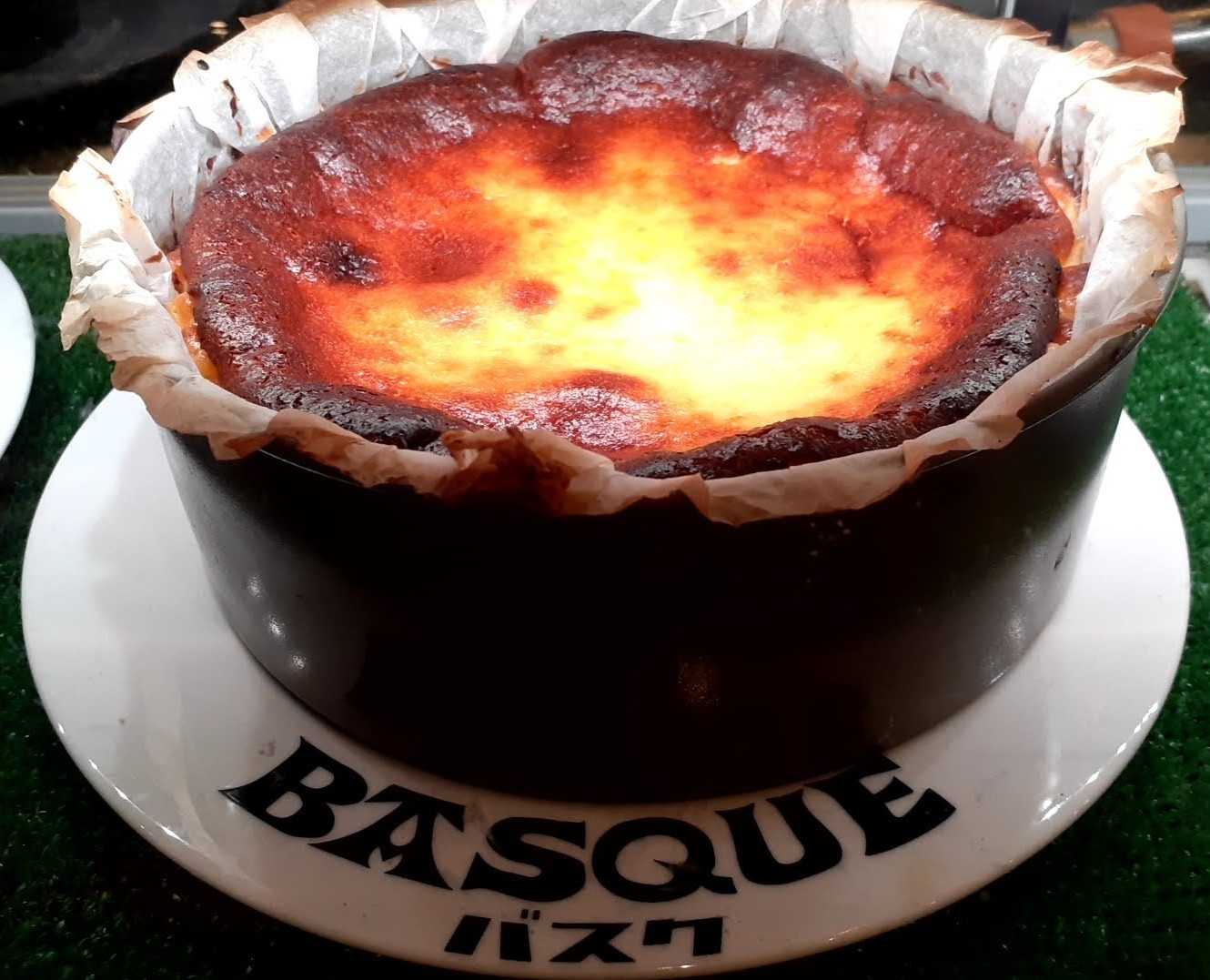
Basque cheesecake

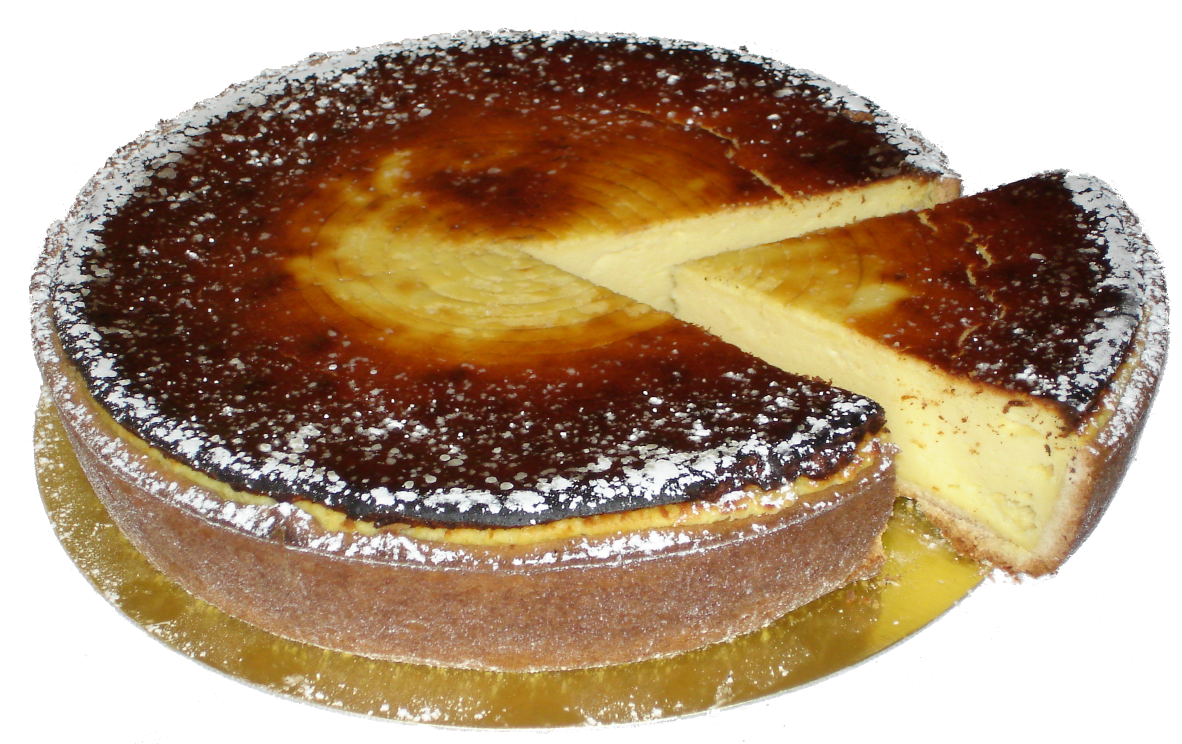
French cheesecake (tarte au fromage)

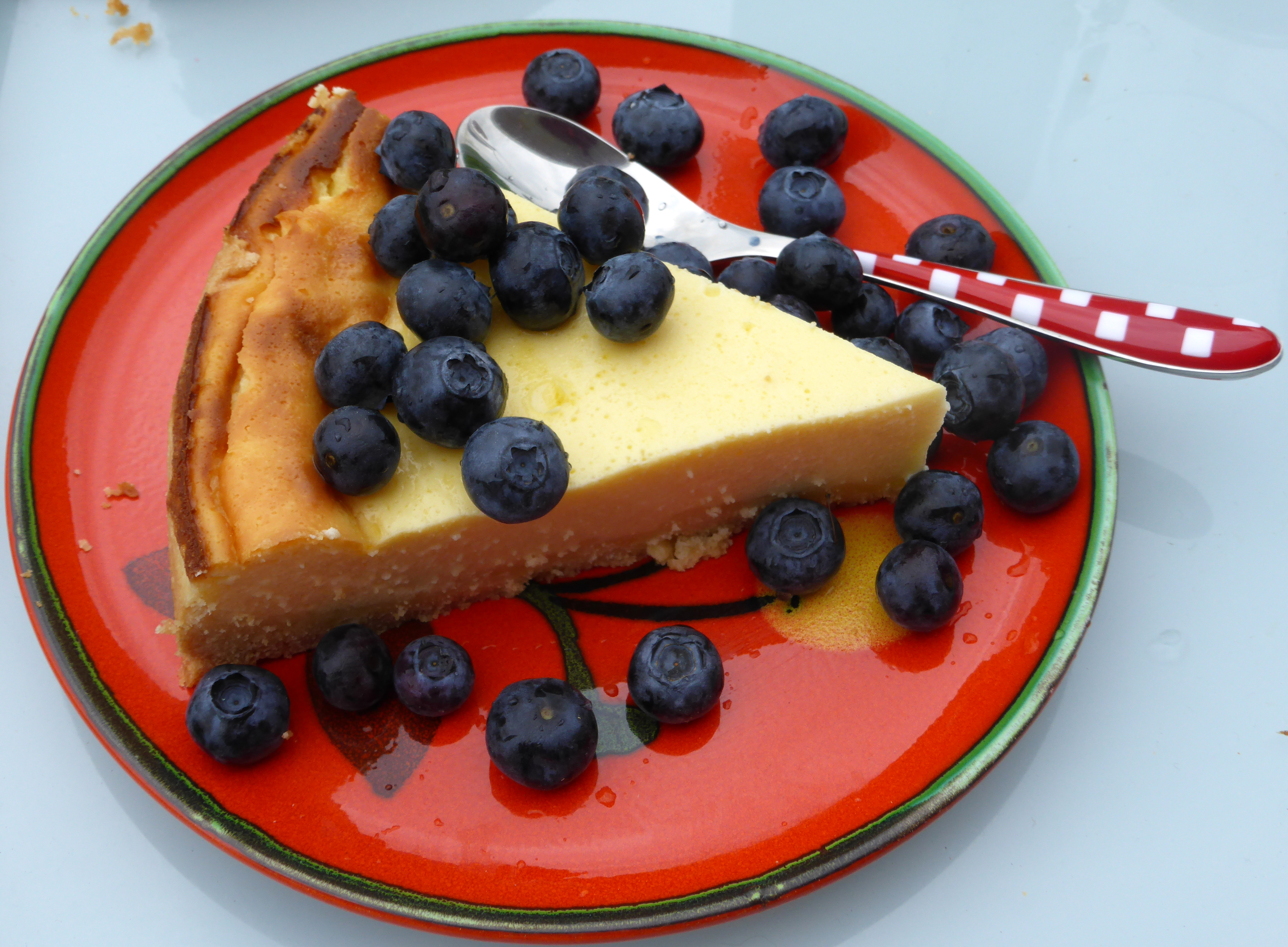
German cheesecake (Käsekuchen)

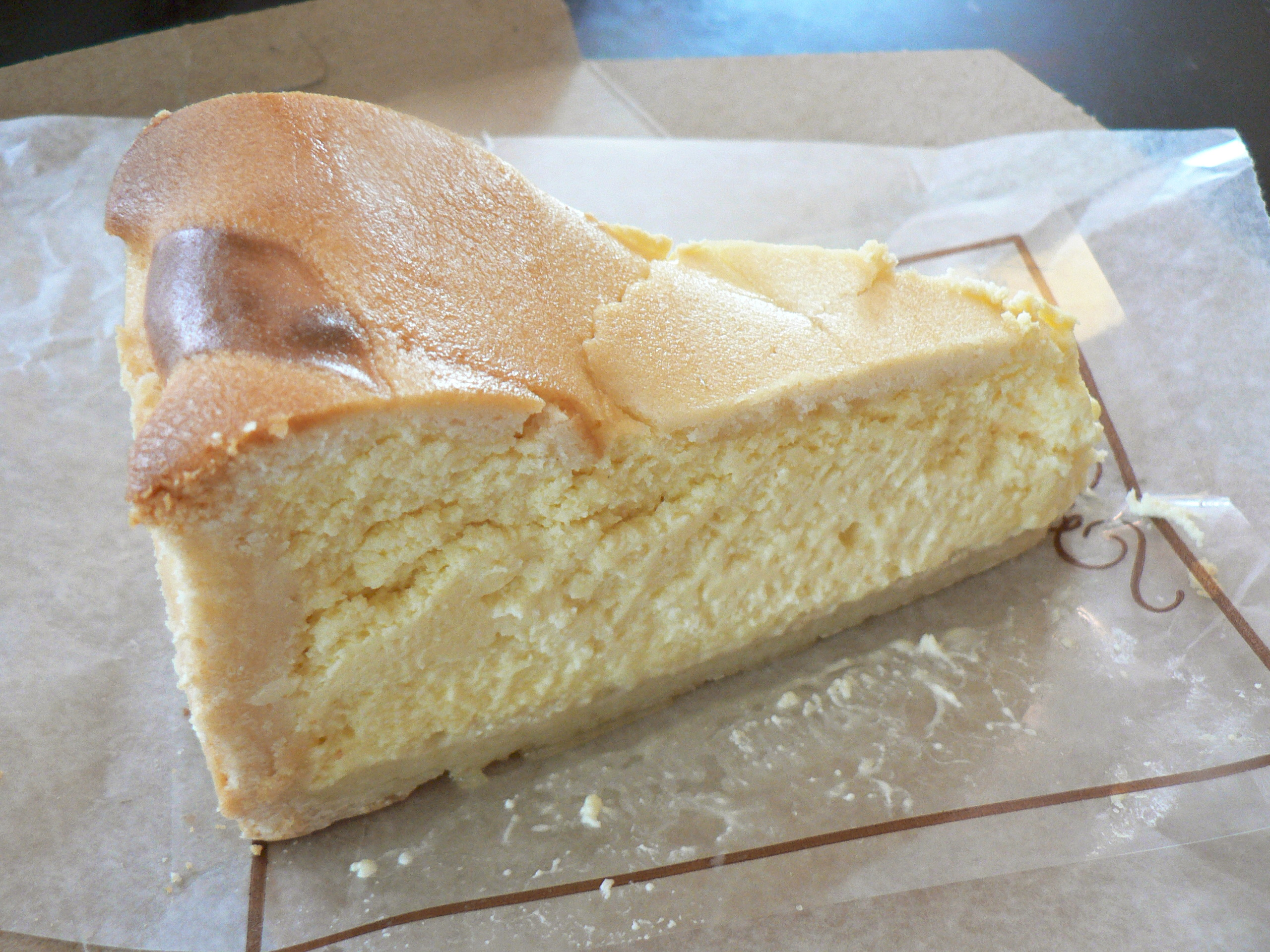
Italian-style ricotta cheesecake

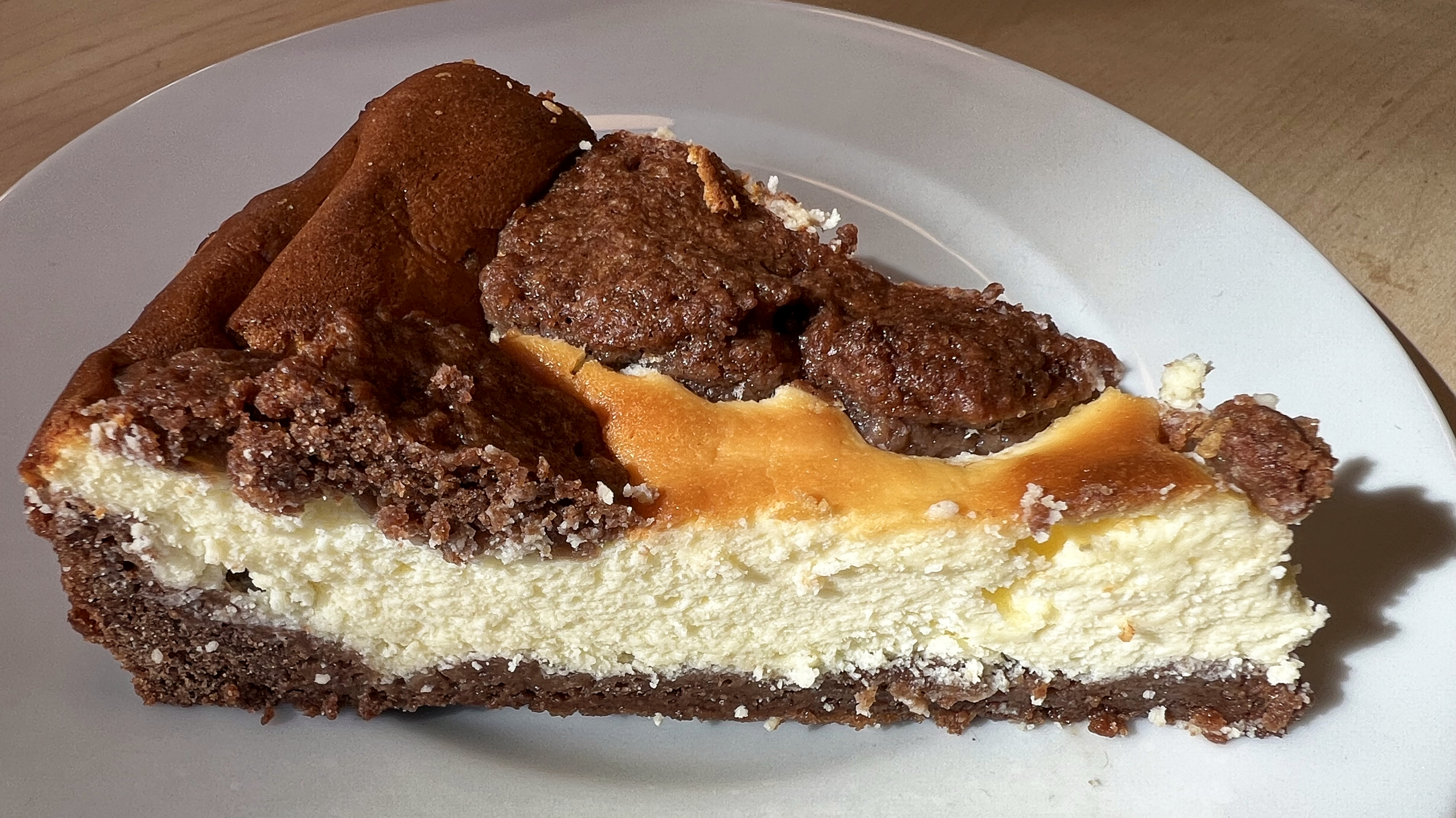
Russischer Zupfkuchen

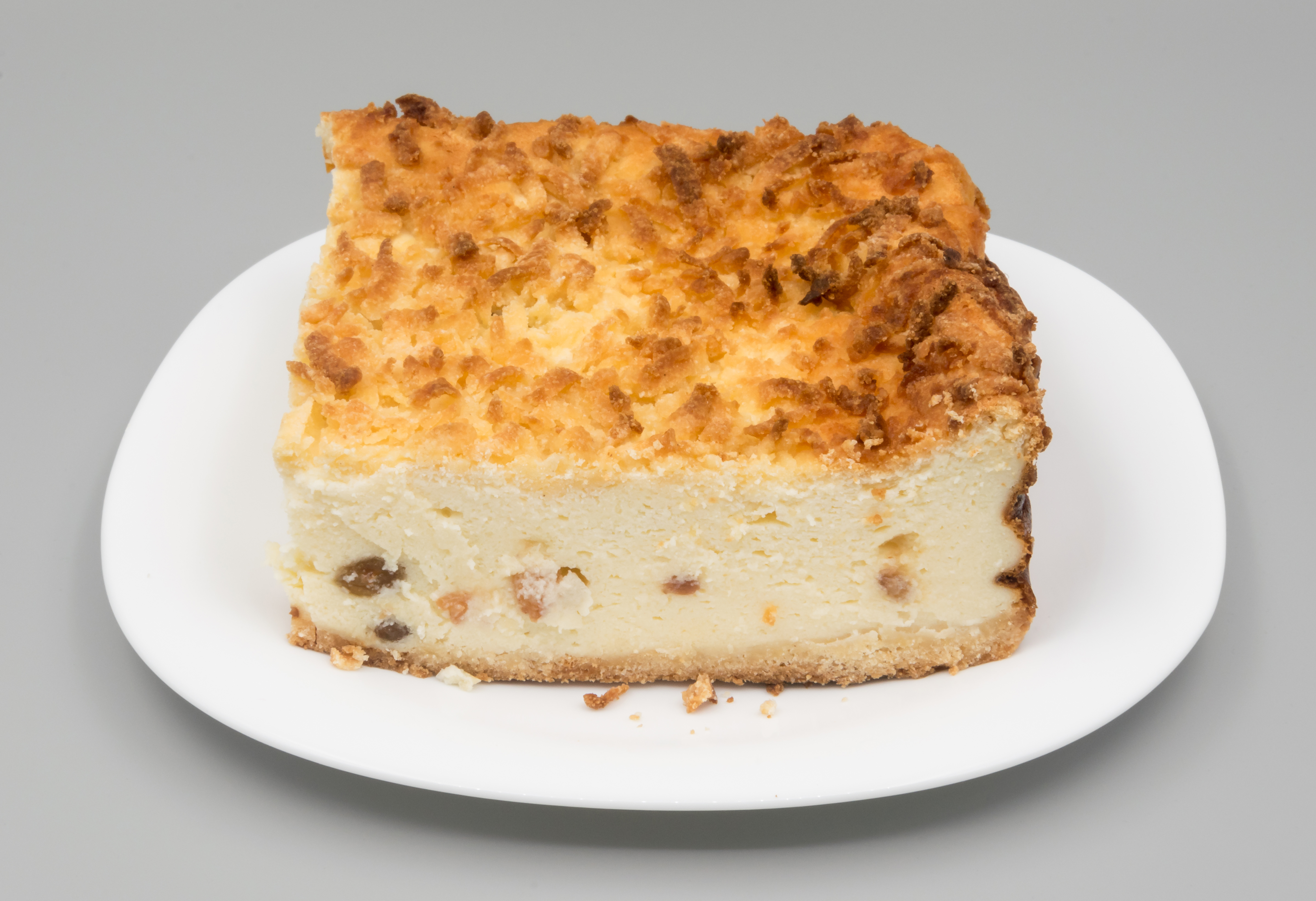
Polish-style cheesecake with raisins (sernik)

=== North America ===
The United States has several different recipes for cheesecake, and this usually depends on the region in which the cake is baked, as well as the cultural background of the person baking it.

Chicago-style cheesecake is a baked cream cheese version that is firm on the outside with a soft and creamy texture on the inside. These cheesecakes are often made in a greased cake pan and are relatively fluffy in texture. The crust used with this style of cheesecake is most commonly made from shortbread that is crushed and mixed with sugar and butter. Some frozen cheesecakes are Chicago-style.

New York–style or Jewish-style cheesecake uses a cream cheese base. Gil Marks traces the origin of the New York-style or Jewish cheesecake in Ashkenazi Jewish cuisine to the 1930s, made famous in such establishments as Reuben's Restaurant and kosher-style Jewish deli Lindy's, opened by German-Jewish immigrant Leo Lindemann in 1921. Earlier cheese pie recipes called for cottage cheese. Cream cheese was invented in 1872 and made its way into American Jewish cuisine by 1929 according to Arnold Reuben, owner of the namesake restaurant, who claims credit for the recipe (as well as the Reuben sandwich) and is said to have won an award at the 1929 World's Fair in Barcelona. Junior's, established by Harry Rosen in 1950, is another NY Jewish establishment famous for New York-style cheesecake. Charles W. Lubin, a Jewish baker in Decatur, Illinois, created the Sara Lee brand of supermarket cheesecakes and expanded into other cakes such as coffee cake, being sold in 48 states.

== See also ==
- Flaó
- Flaouna
- List of desserts
- List of pies, tarts and flans
- Kuih

== Sources ==
- Clarkson, Janet (2009). Pie: A Global History. London: Reaktion Books. ISBN 978-1-86189-425-0.\
- Prochaska, Alice; Prochaska, Frank (1987). Margaretta Acworth's Georgian Cookery Book. London: Pavilion Books. ISBN 1-85145-124-2.
- Wilson, C Anne (1976) [1973]. Food & Drink in Britain: From the Stone Age to Recent Times. Harmondsworth, London: Penguin. ISBN 0-14-055-101-8.
