= Silver Okum Building =

Building in Seattle, Washington, U.S.

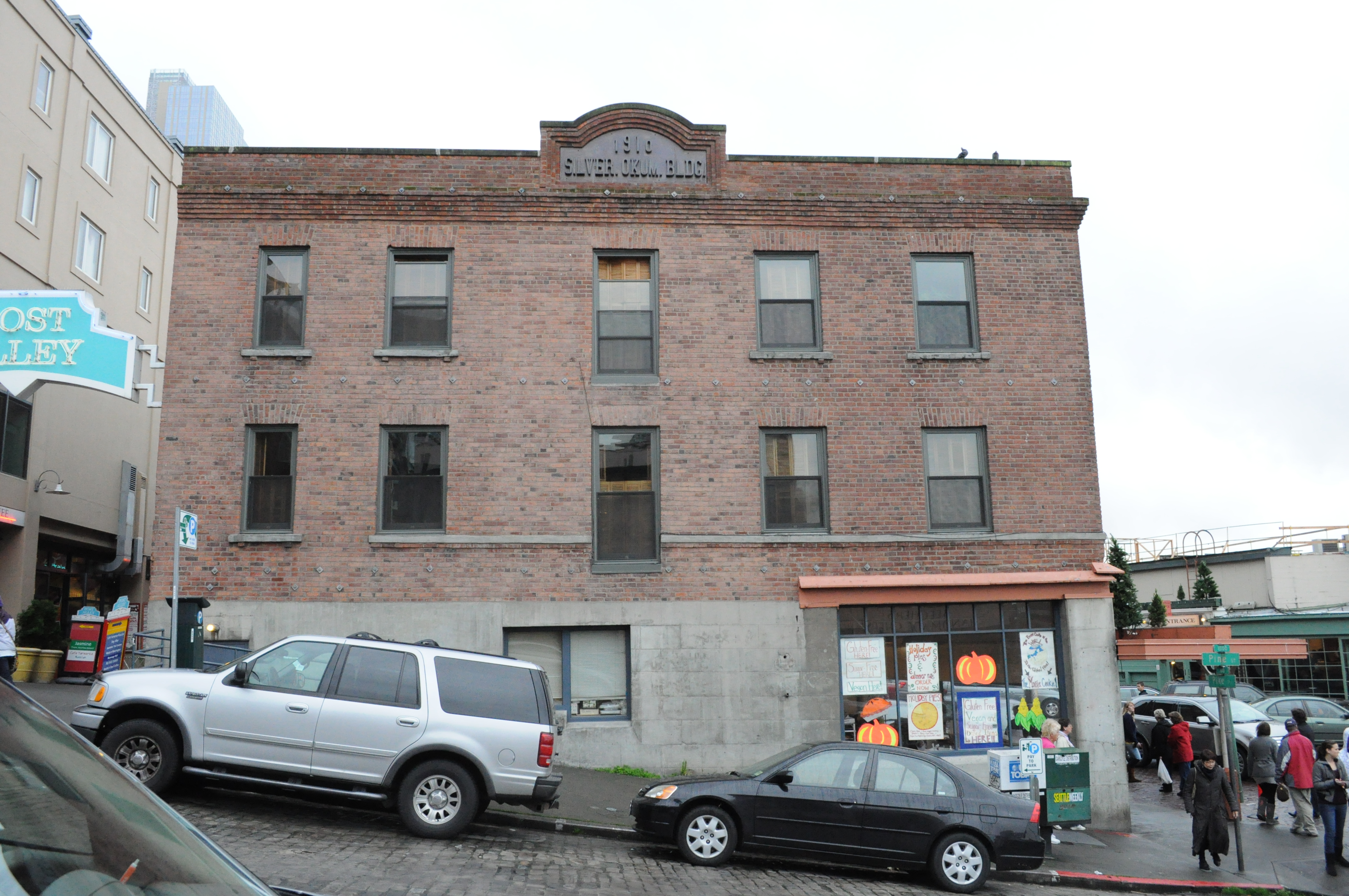
- The building's exterior in 2009
- Interactive map of the Silver Okum Building area

General information
- Location: Seattle, Washington, United States
- Coordinates: 47°36′34″N 122°20′29.5″W

The Silver Okum Building (also known as Hotel Lotus, the Market Apartments, Market Hotel, and the Silver Oakum Building), is a building in Seattle's Pike Place Market, in the U.S. state of Washington. Located at the intersection of Pike Place, Pine Street, and Post Alley, the structure was built during 1909–1910. It was joined internally with the adjacent Triangle Building in 1977. Fred Bassetti completed in the remodel.

Businesses which have operated in the building include Cinnamon Works and The Confectional.

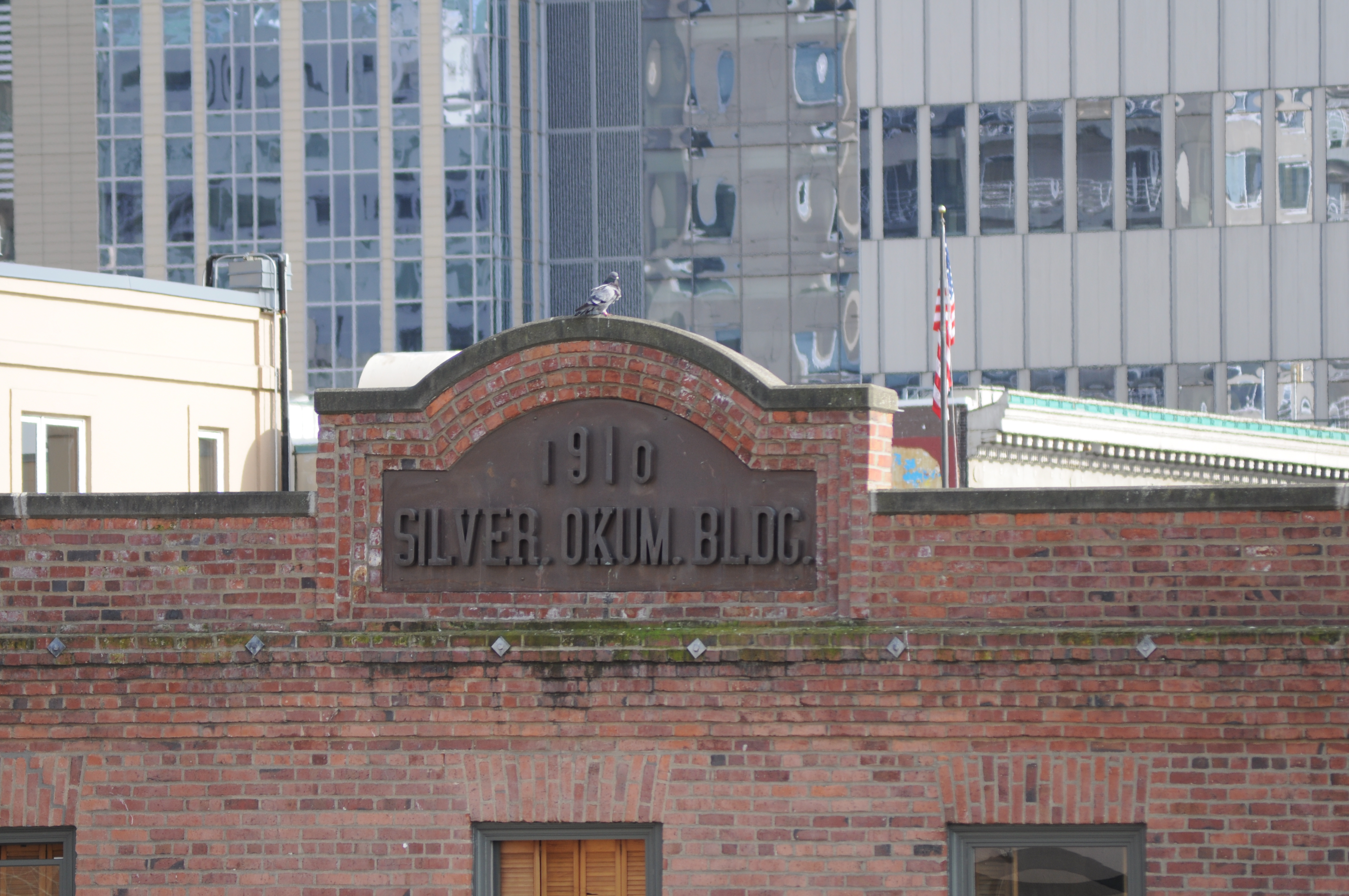
Exterior detail
