= Spanische Windtorte =

Austrian meringue cake

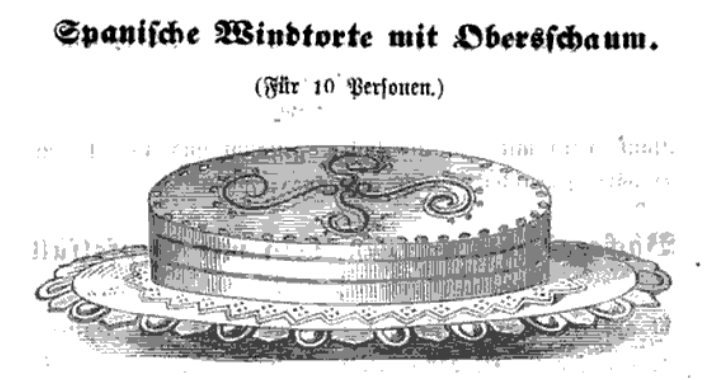
- Spanische Windtorte mit Obersschaum
- Alternative names: Spanish Windcake
- Type: Cake
- Course: Dessert
- Place of origin: Austria
- Main ingredients: Meringue, whipped cream, fresh berries (usually strawberries), chocolate shavings or currants
- Variations: Pavlova

Spanische Windtorte ("Spanish wind torte") is a historical Austrian dessert and is one of the most complex to create and serve as it is composed mostly of meringue and whipped cream. It is a dessert that supposedly became popular during the Baroque period of the Austro-Hungarian empire, with recipes for it appearing in several 19th century cookbooks from Austria.

A Spanische Windtorte consists of rings of meringue that have been baked into a cylindrical form with a bottom and a top lid. The piping of the meringue and the subsequent baking process require patience and careful attention to detail or the cake will not be symmetrical. When the shell of the torte is done it is then filled with whipped cream, fresh berries (usually strawberries), chocolate shavings and/or currants. Because whipped cream and meringue dissolve quickly the torte must be served immediately. Freezing can retain the dessert's consistency but the flavour may be compromised.

The Spanish reference may be due to the Austrian House of Habsburg and their fascination with Spain. An alternative theory states that this is part of a longer-term trend of Catholic pilgrims following the Way of St James. The term "Spanischer Wind" is still used to refer to small baked meringues (also known in English as meringue kisses).

In late 2015, it was featured as the technical challenge in episode 4 of series 6 of The Great British Bake Off, and its appearance on the TV show was credited for a subsequent spike in popularity. A newspaper article about the TV show reported it had earlier been called "the fanciest cake in Vienna".

It has been suggested that the Spanische Windtorte is the origin of the Australian and New Zealand dessert known as Pavlova.
