= Flaó =

Cheesecake or stuffed pastry from Spanish cuisine

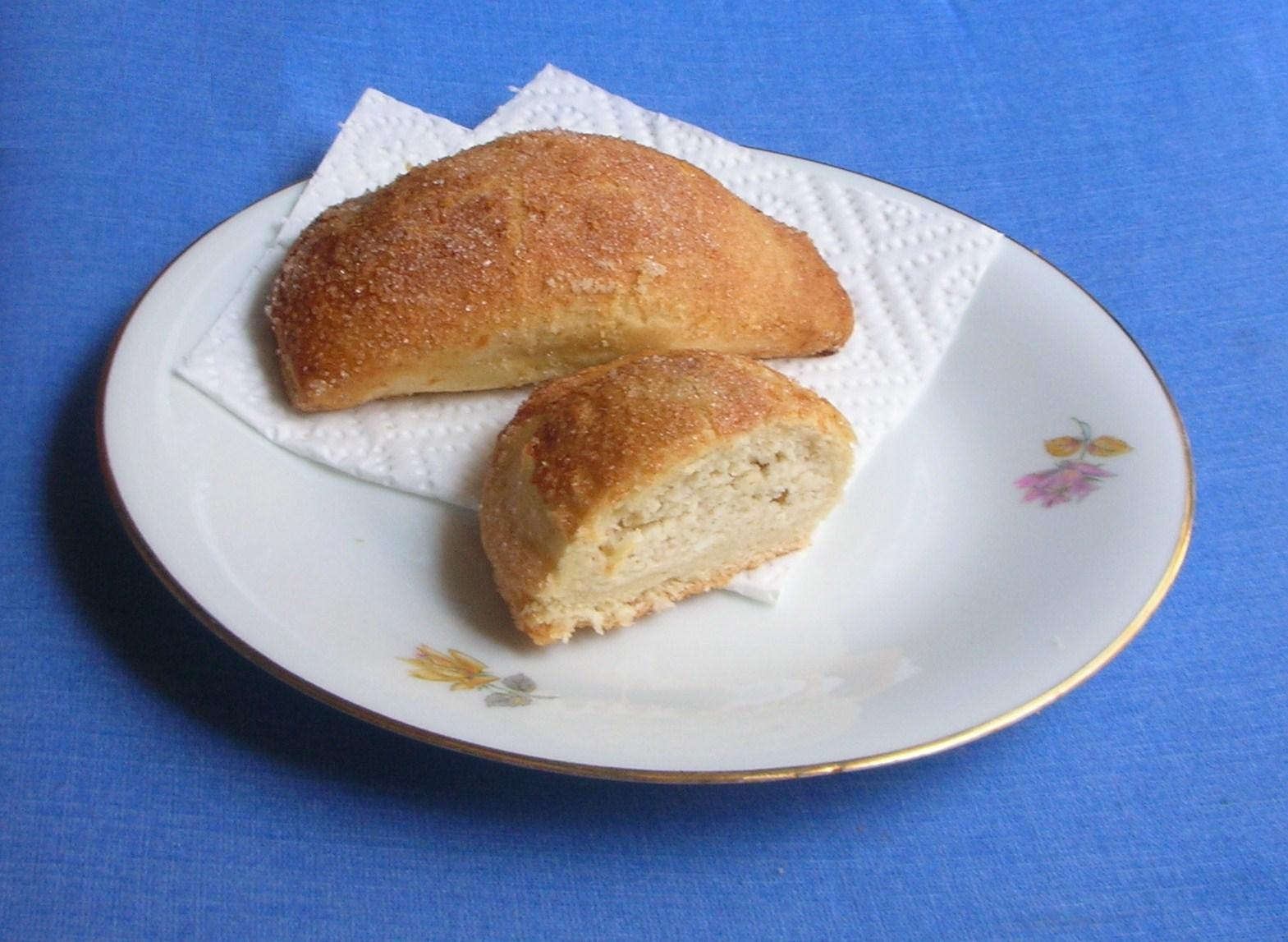
- Flaons de Morella with a filling of cottage cheese (brull)
- Type: Cheesecake/Pie
- Region or state: Levante, Spain
- Main ingredients: Cheese, sugar or honey, jam, dough

Flaó (plural flaons, pronounced [fləˈons]) is a cheesecake or tart found in Spanish cuisine popular in Levante. It is claimed by Majorca, Ibiza and Formentera, with some controversy. Traditionally flaons were part of Easter family celebrations in Menorca, but now they are available all year round.

In some regions flaons are a type of crescent-shaped pie filled with jam and honey in Calasseit, Tarragona, or some type of cheese, varying according to the location. Honey was used traditionally, but in modern times sweet flaons are usually sweetened with sugar. Historically, the first recorded mention of these cakes is from 1252 and they are mentioned as well in Ramon Llull's book Blanquerna, written in 1283.

== Variants ==
=== Alt Maestrat ===
In the Alt Maestrat and Ports areas the cake has a semicircular shape and it is filled with a mixture of local cottage cheese (brull) and ground almonds flavored with aguardiente and mistela. The flaons of Morella are the gastronomic icon of the ancient city. An average-sized Morella flaó is about 12 cm long.

=== Ibiza and Formentera ===
The flaó d'Eivissa has a circular shape and has a filling of sheep or goat cottage cheese, eggs and sugar, slightly aromatized with peppermint leaves and aniseed. Flaons are usually eaten along with a glass of sweet wine or the local Liqueur frígola, a thyme-based digestive beverage.

=== Menorca ===
The flaó de Menorca is a pastry made with tender Maó cheese, wheat flour, olive oil and yeast. Often they include egg and a little lard in the recipe. Good Menorca flaons have to be very puffy in the middle. There are salty and sweet versions of this pastry in Menorca. Some of them have a filling, while in others all the ingredients are mixed together.

=== Matarranya ===
The flaonets de Calaceit (Catalan: flaonets = little flaons) are made in Calaceit, a town of La Franja region of Aragon. They are a different kind of pastry despite their name, for instead of cheese these small pastries have a filling based on pumpkin jam and honey. These flaonets were one of the traditional Spanish pastries fondly remembered by painter Salvador Dalí.

== Gallery ==
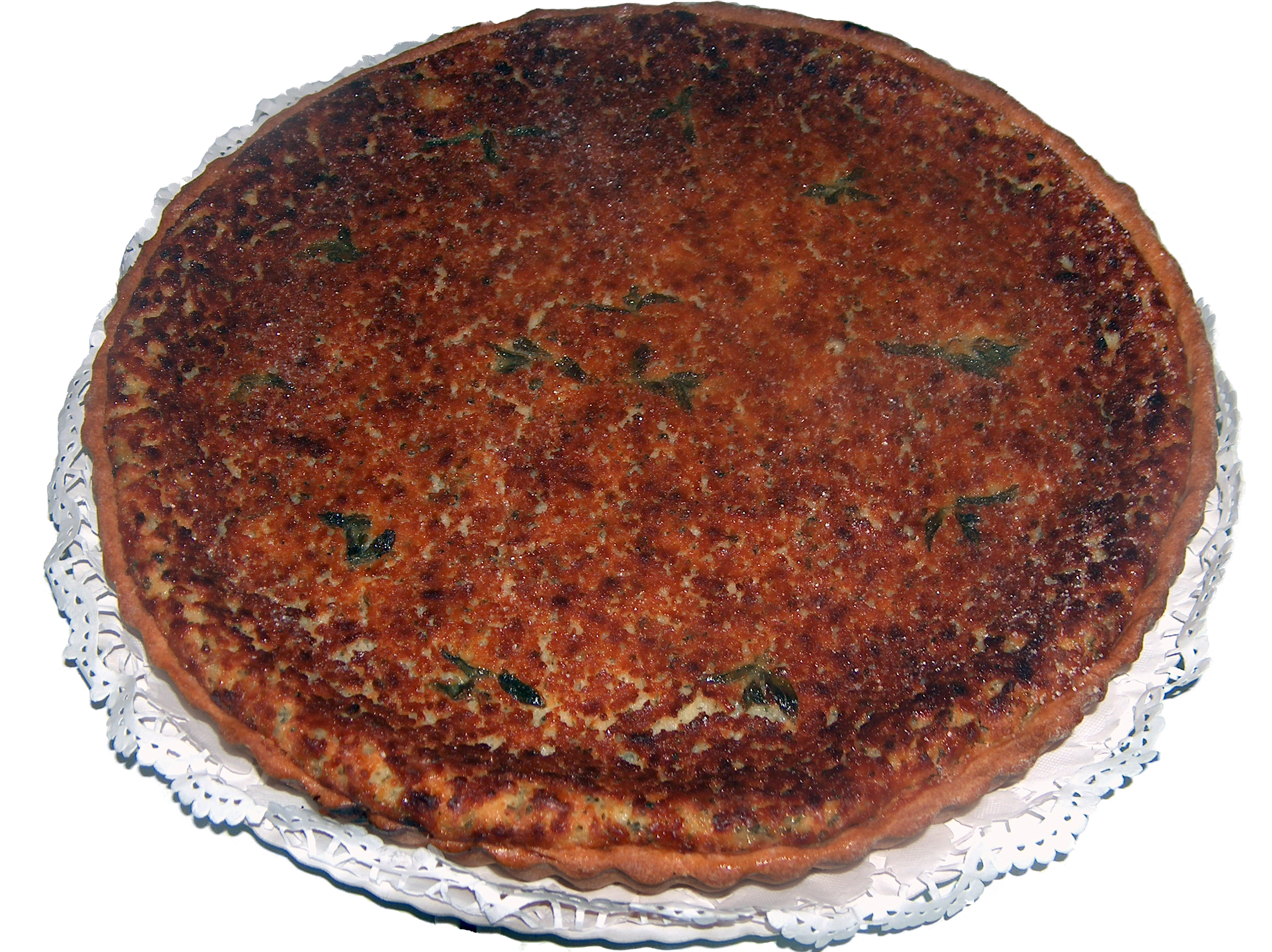
Flaó d'Eivissa made in Ibiza

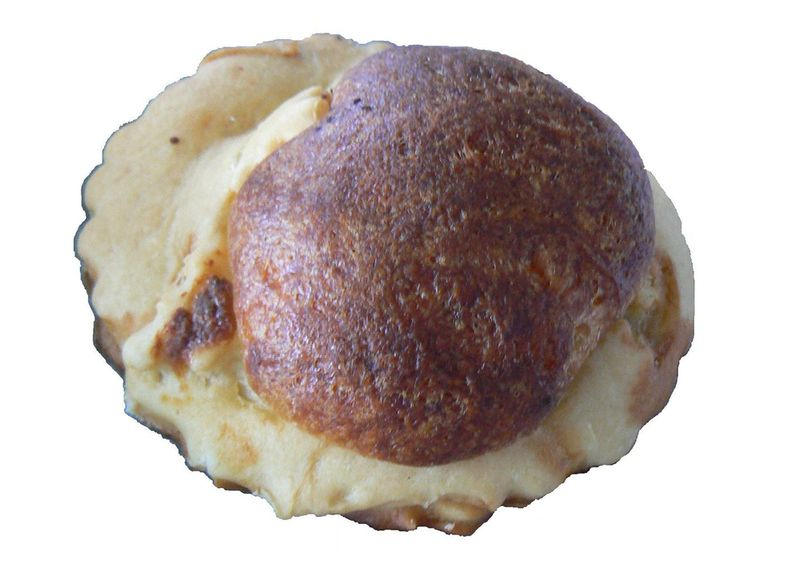
Flaó de Menorca from Menorca

== See also ==
- Flaouna
