= Zapekanka =

Slavic casserole-like baked dish

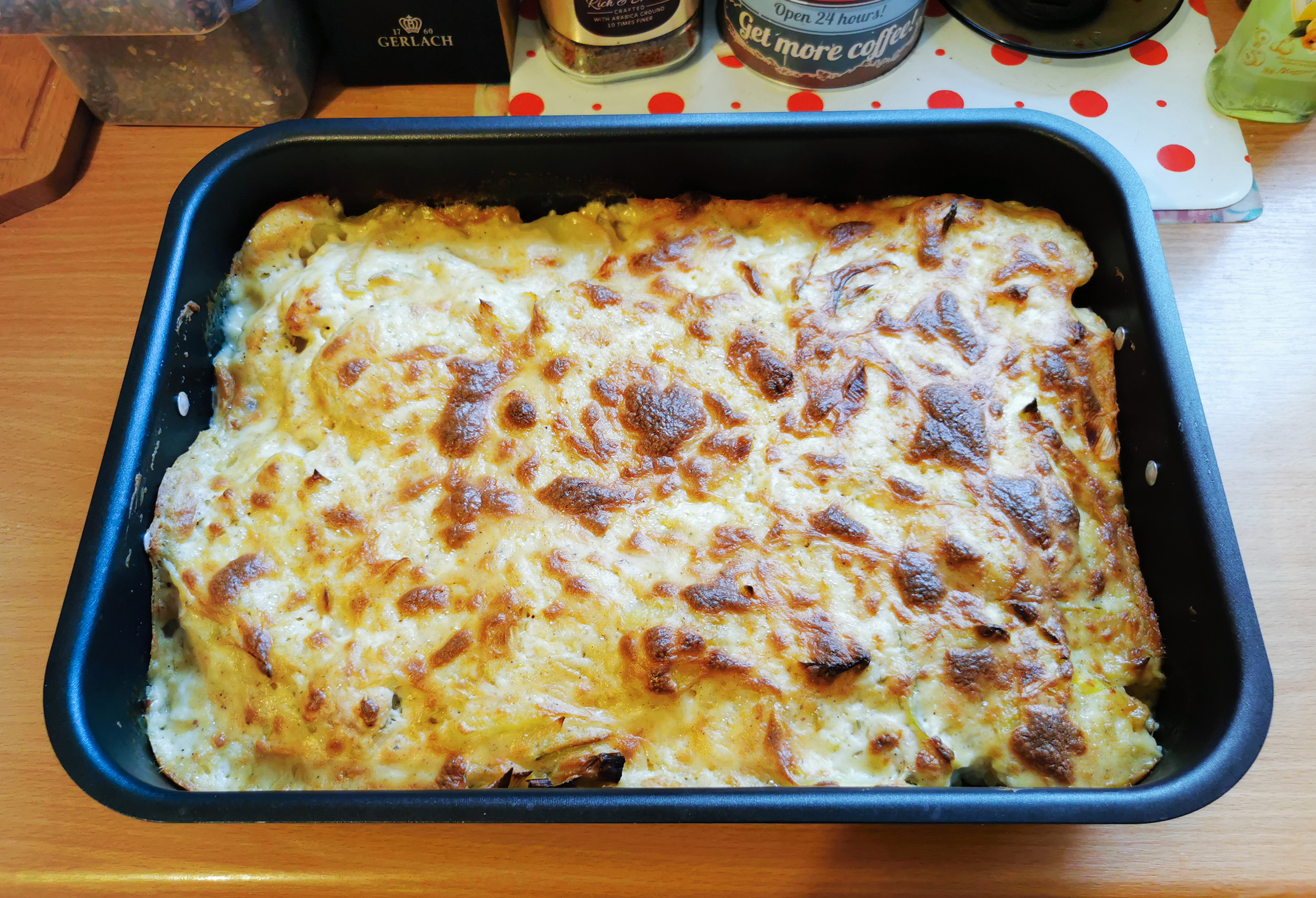
Potato zapekanka

In East Slavic cuisine, zapekanka (Russian: запеканка) is a cheesecake whose base constitutes a pureed ingredient and a binding component.

The most common type is farmer cheese zapekanka, a sweet dish made from farmer's cheese (known as tvorog), eggs, sugar, and semolina (known as manka in Russian) or flour. Zapekanka was one of the simple staple foods in the former Soviet Union. Ingredients like raisins or other fruits are often added to the sweet version.

Savory versions are also common, with bases such as mashed potatoes, shredded cabbage, cauliflower, or pasta, often including minced meat, mushrooms or other vegetables. While savory zapekankas are similar to Western dishes like gratin, the sweet cottage cheese version resembles a baked pudding. or a crustless cheesecake.

The Russian dish Картофельная запеканка (lit. 'potato zapekanka') was similar to a cottage pie, with mashed potato, minced pork or beef, and mashed potato layers, and was often served with smetana. It was a staple of Soviet cafeterias.

== See also ==
- Cheesecake
