= Flaouna =

Cheese-filled pastry from Cyprus

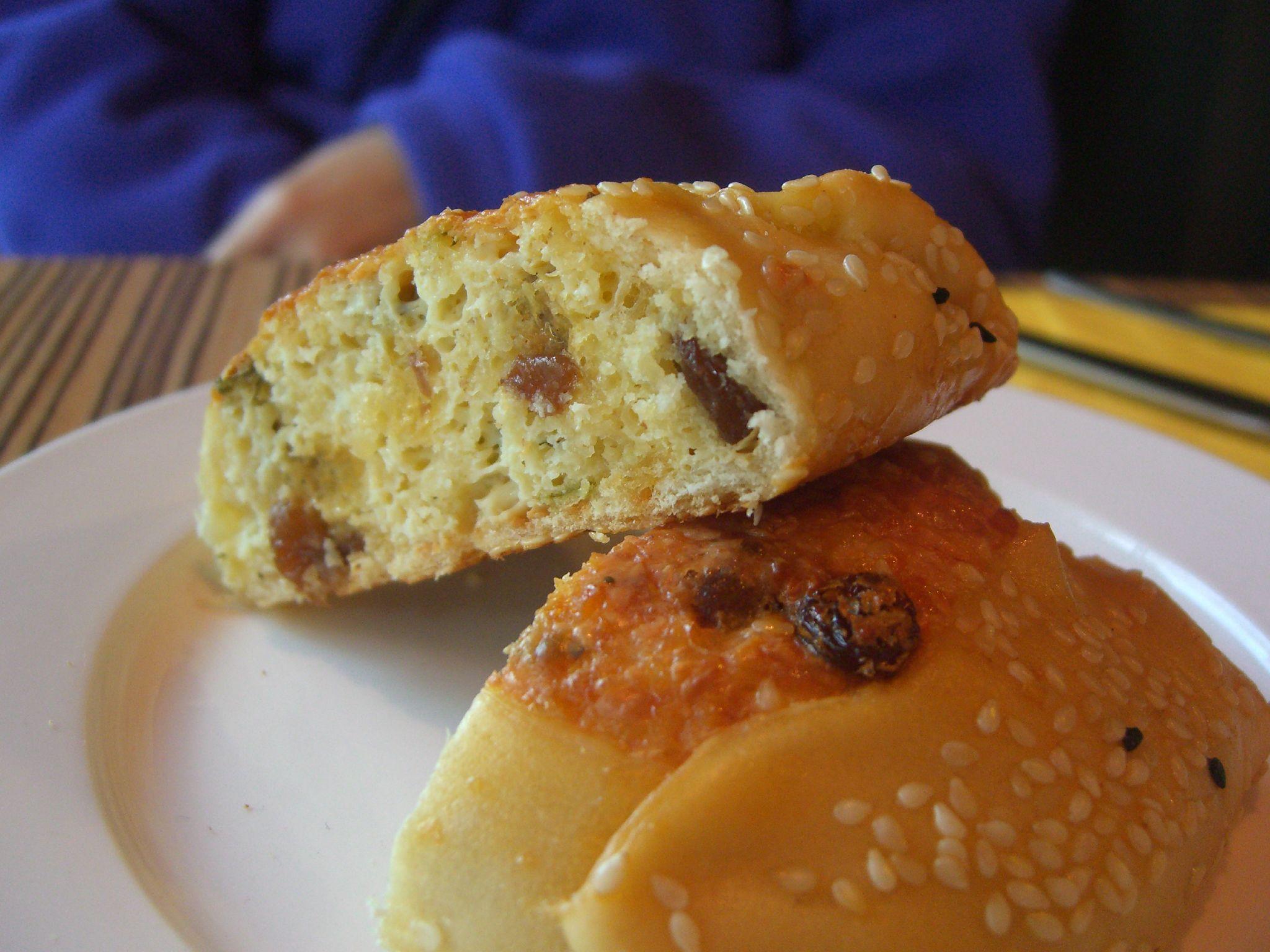
- A flaouna halved, showing both the sesame seed topping and the raisins inside
- Type: Baked goods
- Place of origin: Cyprus
- Main ingredients: Cheese
- Variations: May include raisins

Flaouna (Greek: φλαούνα) (Turkish: Pilavuna) is a cheese-filled baked goods from Cyprus, also consumed in parts of Greece. Most recipes may include raisins or be garnished with sesame seeds. Flaounes are traditionally prepared for Easter. Regional names for flaouna include vlaouna, fesoudki (Greek:φεσούδκι) in Karavas, and aflaouna in Karpasia.

The name Flaouna is derived from the Greek word παλάθη (paláthē> flado> fladoonis> flauna), a cake of preserved or dried fruit.

Flaounes are closely tied to Easter customs and are traditionally prepared in large batches by families in the days leading up to the celebration. The pastries use ingredients such as eggs and cheese that are avoided during the Lenten fast, and they are eaten once the fast ends, often replacing bread on Easter Sunday and continuing to be consumed for several weeks afterward. The preparation itself is commonly a social activity, with relatives gathering to mix the cheese filling, shape the pastries, and bake them together.

== History ==
Flaounes are traditionally served in Cyprus, parts of Greece (especially Arcadia) and more widely in the Greek diaspora as a celebratory food for the breaking of the Lenten fast, being prepared on Great and Holy Friday for consumption on Easter Sunday. They are eaten in place of bread on Easter Sunday, and continue to be made and eaten for the weeks following. Creating the flaounes can often be a family tradition shared with multiple generations.

Flaounes have also been adopted by many Turkish Cypriots who were influenced by the Greek Cypriots, and are often consumed in Ramadan or alongside special events.

The Guinness World Records holds a record for the largest flaouna ever made. It was set on 11 April 2012 by the company Carrefour in Limassol. The pastry measured 2.45 metres (8.0 ft) long and 1.24 metres (4.1 ft) wide, weighing 259.5 kilograms (572 lb). As part of the celebrations, 20 percent of sales of flaounes in Carrefour stores on the day in Cyprus went to charity.

Flaounes were featured as a technical challenge in The Great British Bake Off pastry week episode of season six.

== Recipe ==
Flaounes are a cheese-filled quick bread dough commonly flavored with mastic, mahleb and spearmint. The bread is described as similar to shortcrust in texture. A sheep and goat cheese known as tiri flaounas or flaouna cheese, that is made in the region of Paphos, is traditionally the main cheese used in the filling. Any mix of graviera, halloumi, fresh anari or kefalotyri can be further added to the mixture.

Flaounes may be served hot or cold. Depending on the area of the island in which they are made, the recipes vary so that the bread are either salty, semi-sweet or sweet. They can also sometimes have sesame seeds sprinkled on top or sultanas interspersed with the cheese.

== See also ==
- Mandelbrot (cookie)

== See also ==
- Flaó
- Fiadone
