= Sabor (restaurant) =

Spanish restaurant in London, United Kingdom

- Interactive map of Sabor

Restaurant information
- Established: October 2017
- Chef: Nieves Barragán Mohacho
- Food type: Spanish
- Rating: 1 Michelin star
- Location: 35-37 Heddon Street, London, United Kingdom
- Coordinates: 51°30′41.2″N 0°08′22.2″W
- Website: saborrestaurants.co.uk

Sabor is a Michelin-starred Spanish restaurant in London, United Kingdom.

== See also ==
- List of Michelin-starred restaurants in Greater London
- List of Spanish restaurants
