= Pavlova =

Meringue-based dessert

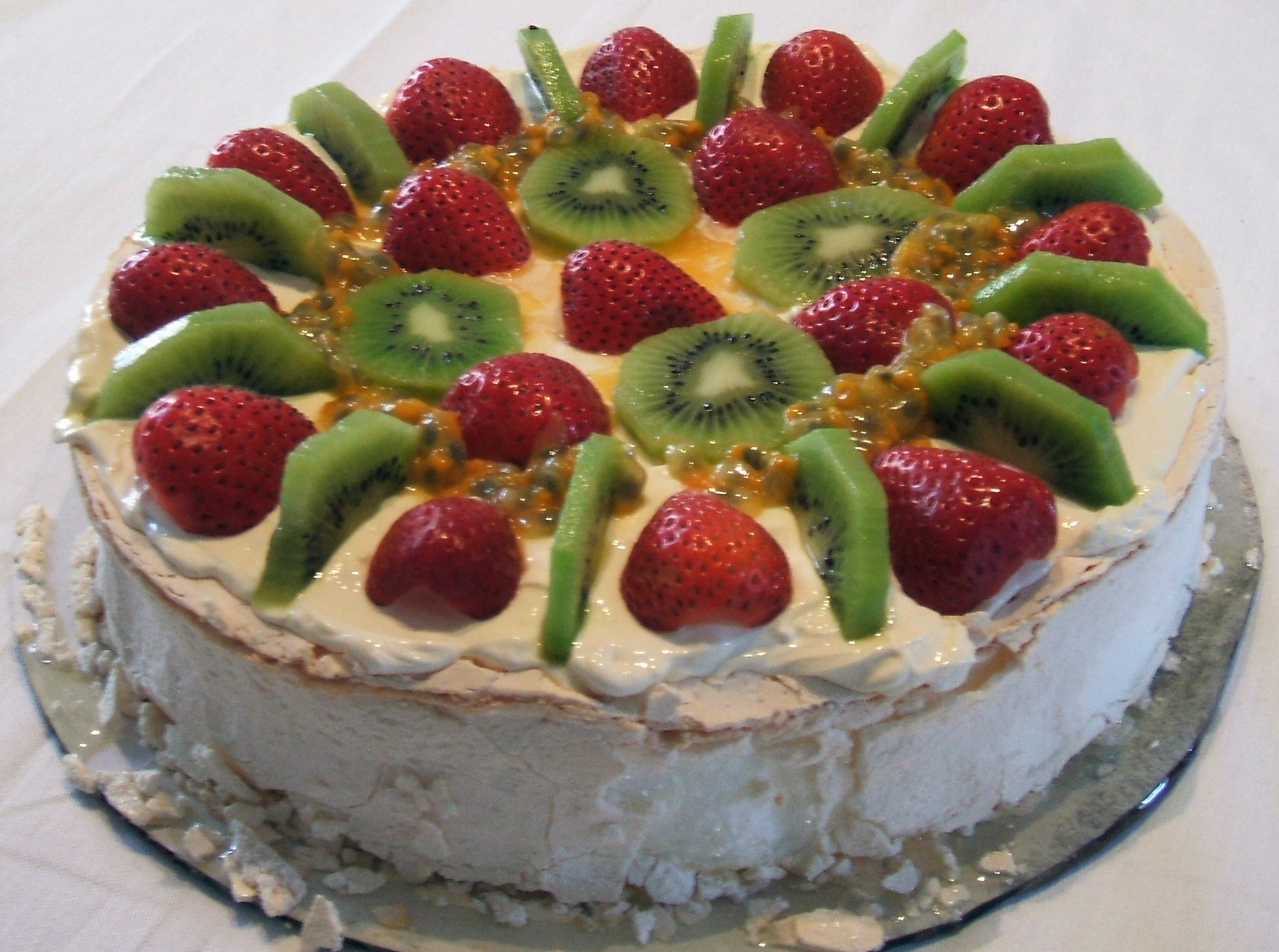
- A pavlova garnished with kiwifruit, strawberries and passionfruit
- Course: Dessert
- Associated cuisine: Australia and New Zealand
- Main ingredients: Egg whites, caster sugar

Pavlova is a meringue-based dessert. Originating in either Australia or New Zealand in the early 20th century, it was named after the Russian prima ballerina Anna Pavlova. Taking the form of a cake-like circular block of baked meringue, pavlova has a crisp crust and soft, light inside. The confection is usually topped with fruit and whipped cream. The name is commonly pronounced /pævˈloʊvə/ pav-LOH-və or (in North America) /pɑːvˈloʊvə/ pahv-LOH-və, and occasionally closer to the name of the dancer, as /ˈpɑːvləvə/ PAHV-lə-və.

The dessert is believed to have been created in honour of the dancer either during or after one of her tours to Australia and New Zealand in the 1920s. The nationality of its creator has been a source of argument between the two nations for many years. The dessert is an important part of the national cuisine of both Australia and New Zealand. It is frequently served during celebratory and holiday meals. It is most identified with and consumed most frequently in summer, including at Christmas time.

== Dispute over origin ==
The origins of the pavlova are a subject of a long-standing dispute between Australia and New Zealand. Both nations claim the dish as a national symbol.

A recipe for "Strawberries Pavlova" appeared in the New Zealand Herald on 11 November 1911, but this was a kind of ice block or sorbet. Annabelle Utrecht, who wrote a book about the possible origins of pavlova, believes that this is a reprint from England.

A 1922 book, Australian Home Cookery by Emily Futter, contained a recipe for "Meringue with Fruit Filling". David Burton regards this as the first known recipe for a food resembling the modern pavlova; Australian food writer Michael Symons, however, does not recognise it as such, pointing to its lack of vinegar or cornflour, to the absence of the pavlova name, and to its description as a meringue cake cut in half and filled.

Another recipe for a dish bearing the name pavlova was published in 1926 by the Davis Gelatine company in Sydney. However, this was a multi-layered jelly, not the meringue, cream and fruit dessert known today.

Helen Leach, in her role as a culinary anthropologist at the University of Otago, states that the first recipe from New Zealand was a recipe for "pavlova cake" in 1929. A recipe for pavlova cake was published in The Evening Star on 10 November 1934.

The Beverley Times claimed that Bert Sachse created the dish at the Esplanade Hotel in Perth, Western Australia, in 1935. In defence of his claim as inventor of the dish, a relative of Sachse's wrote to Leach suggesting that Sachse may have accidentally dated the recipe incorrectly. Leach replied they would not find evidence for that "because it's just not showing up in the cookbooks until really the 1940s in Australia." However, a recipe for "pavlova cake" was published in The Advocate in 1935, and a 1937 issue of The Australian Women's Weekly contains a "pavlova sweet cake" recipe. A 1935 advertisement for a chromium ring used to prevent the dessert collapsing also indicates that the term "pavlova cake" had some currency in Auckland at that time.

Other researchers have said that the origins of pavlova lie outside both Australia and New Zealand. Research conducted by New Zealander Andrew Paul Wood and Australian Annabelle Utrecht found that the origins of the modern pavlova can be traced back to the Austro-Hungarian Spanische Windtorte. It was later brought to the United States where German-speaking immigrants introduced meringue, whipped cream, and fruit desserts called Schaumtorte ("foam cake") and Baisertorte. American corn starch packages which included recipes for meringue were exported to New Zealand in the 1890s.

Another story is that an unnamed New Zealand chef created Pavlova in 1926 in a Wellington hotel. Food anthropologist Helen Leach of the University of Otago was unable to verify that this was true. She found at least 21 pavlova recipes in New Zealand cookbooks by 1940, the year the Australian recipes appeared. She wrote the book The Pavlova Story. The first she found was a multlayered and layered jelly in 1926. In 1928 from Dunedin, a walnut and coffee-flavoured meringue recipe was created and became popular throughout New Zealand. In 1929 a third recipe was published in the Dairy Farmer's Annual. Leach said that this third recipe was "stolen/falsely claimed by chefs/cooks across the Tasman". A fourth recipe was published in the Rangiora Mother's Union Cookery Book of Tried and Tested Recipes in 1933, two years before a similar recipe was published in Australia, later republished to raise funds for the Rangiora Church. This recipe was a single-layered small cake, whose preparation consisted in two egg whites, sugar and cornflour, but with no vinegar, baked in a sandwich tin. One year later a recipe was published in the New Zealand Women's Weekly, which contained four egg whites, a breakfast cup of sugar and a teaspoon of vinegar, to be cooked in a cake tin.

An article in Melbourne's The Argus from 17 November 1928 claims an "American ice-cream" was named after Anna Pavlova: "Dame Nellie Melba, of course, has found fame apart from her art in the famous sweet composed of peaches and cream, while Mme. Anna Pavlova lends her name to a popular variety of American ice-cream." This article may suggest that pavlova has American origins. However, it's unclear how these words should be interpreted and whether that article is relevant. Firstly, the authors of that article offer no evidence for their claims or any depth of discussion of their claims. Secondly, given that pavlova is not an ice-cream, it is highly unclear as to whether the words "American ice-cream" is referring to the modern pavlova dessert or something else entirely.

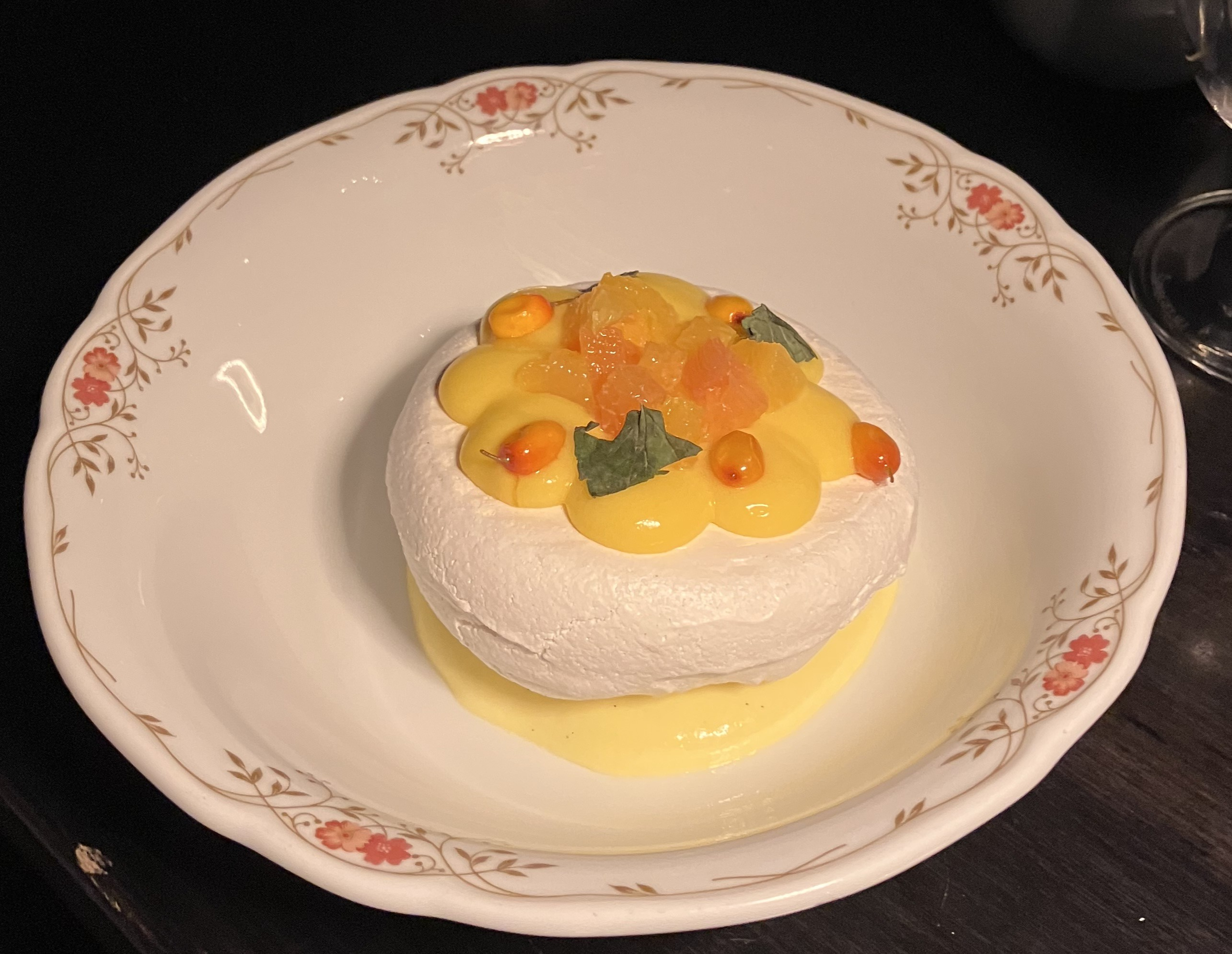
Citrus Pavlova from a gourmet restaurant

Michael Symons, an Australian then researching in New Zealand, has declared that pavlova has no singular birthplace. Rather, published recipes reveal the complex process of "social invention" with practical experience circulating, under a variety of names, across both countries. For example, Australians beat New Zealanders to create an accepted pavlova recipe as the 'Meringue Cake'. The illusion of some singular invention can be explained by distinguishing a second, associated level of "social construction", in which cooks, eaters and writers attach a name and myths to produce a widely-held concept that appears so deceptively distinct that it must have had a definite moment of creation.

Matthew Evans, a restaurant critic for The Sydney Morning Herald, said that it was unlikely that a definitive answer about the dessert's origins would ever be found. "People have been doing meringue with cream for a long time, I don't think Australia or New Zealand were the first to think of doing that."

In 2010 the Oxford English Dictionary noted that the first recorded recipe of pavlova was from 1927 in Davis Dainty Dishes, published by the Davis Gelatine Company in New Zealand. This was a multi-coloured jelly dish. Confusingly, the dictionary ambiguously listed the origin as "Austral. and N.Z".

== Preparation and consumption ==
Pavlova is made in a similar way to meringue. Egg whites (and sometimes salt) are beaten to a very stiff consistency, gradually adding caster sugar before folding in vinegar or lemon juice (or another edible acid), cornflour, and vanilla essence. The meringue mixture is placed on to baking paper and shaped to form a round cake around 20 cm (8 in) in diameter with a slightly recessed centre. The meringue is baked in a slow oven (120–150 °C; 250–300 °F; gas mark 1/2, 1, or 2) for 45–60 minutes, then left in the oven to cool and dry out, usually overnight.

Pavlova has a crisp and crunchy outer shell, and a soft, moist marshmallow-like centre, in contrast to meringue which is usually solid throughout. It has been suggested the addition of cornflour is responsible for the marshmallow centre, although it has been debated that the cornflour is just another egg white stabiliser in addition to the acid.

Pavlova is traditionally decorated with a topping of whipped cream and fresh soft fruit such as kiwifruit, passionfruit, and strawberries. Factory-made pavlovas can be purchased at supermarkets and decorated as desired. A commercial product is available that includes pre-mixed ingredients for baking the meringue shell, requiring only the addition of water and sugar.

Leftover decorated pavlova can be refrigerated overnight, but the dessert will absorb moisture and lose its crispness. Undecorated pavlova can be left overnight in the oven, or for several days in an airtight container, to be decorated when ready.

New Zealand pavlova is more likely to have kiwifruit. In Australia, pavlova often has passionfruit and sometimes pineapples. In Britain it is more likely to have strawberries. Older versions of pavlova would have walnuts.

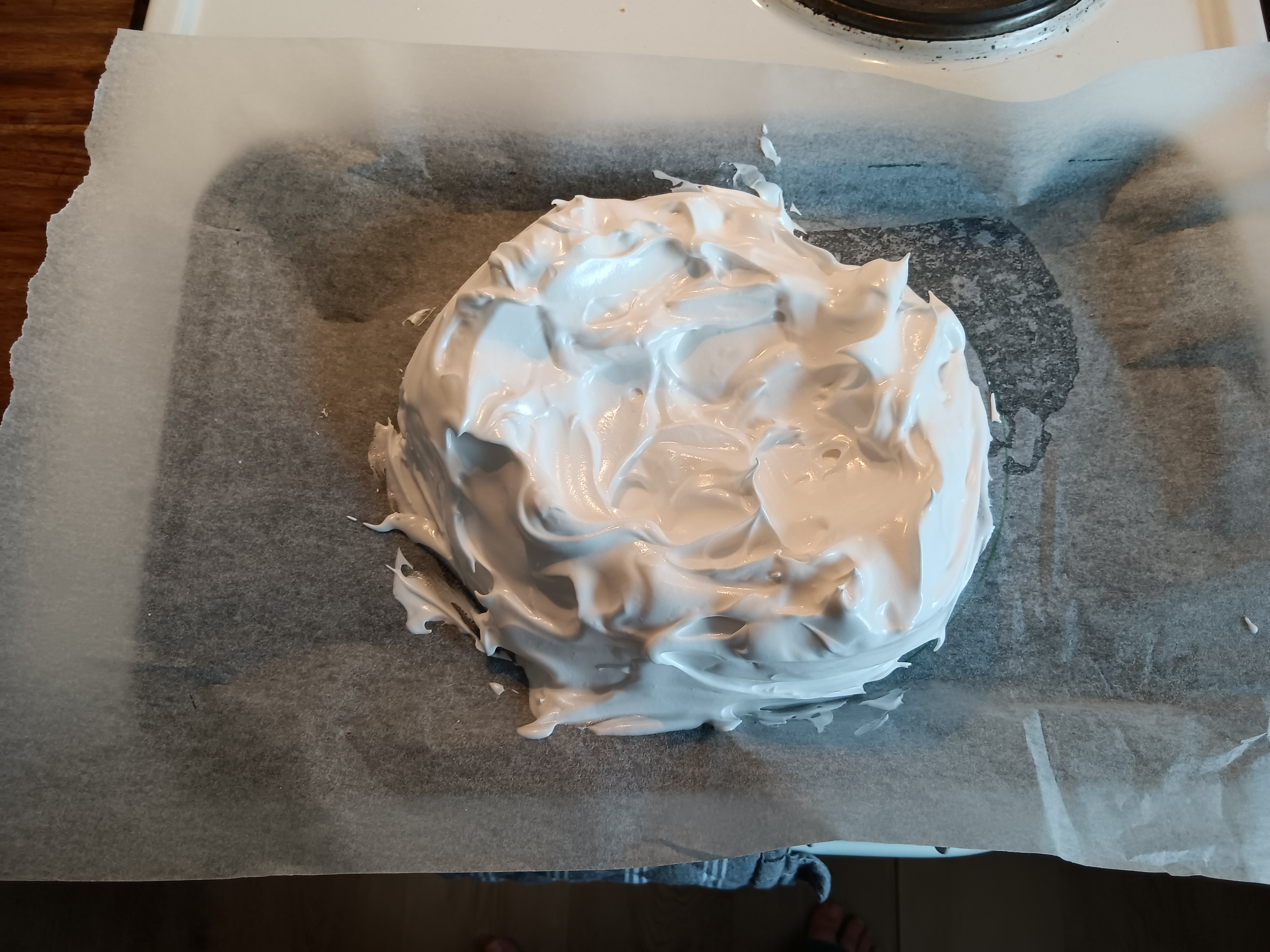
A homemade pavlova prior to baking.

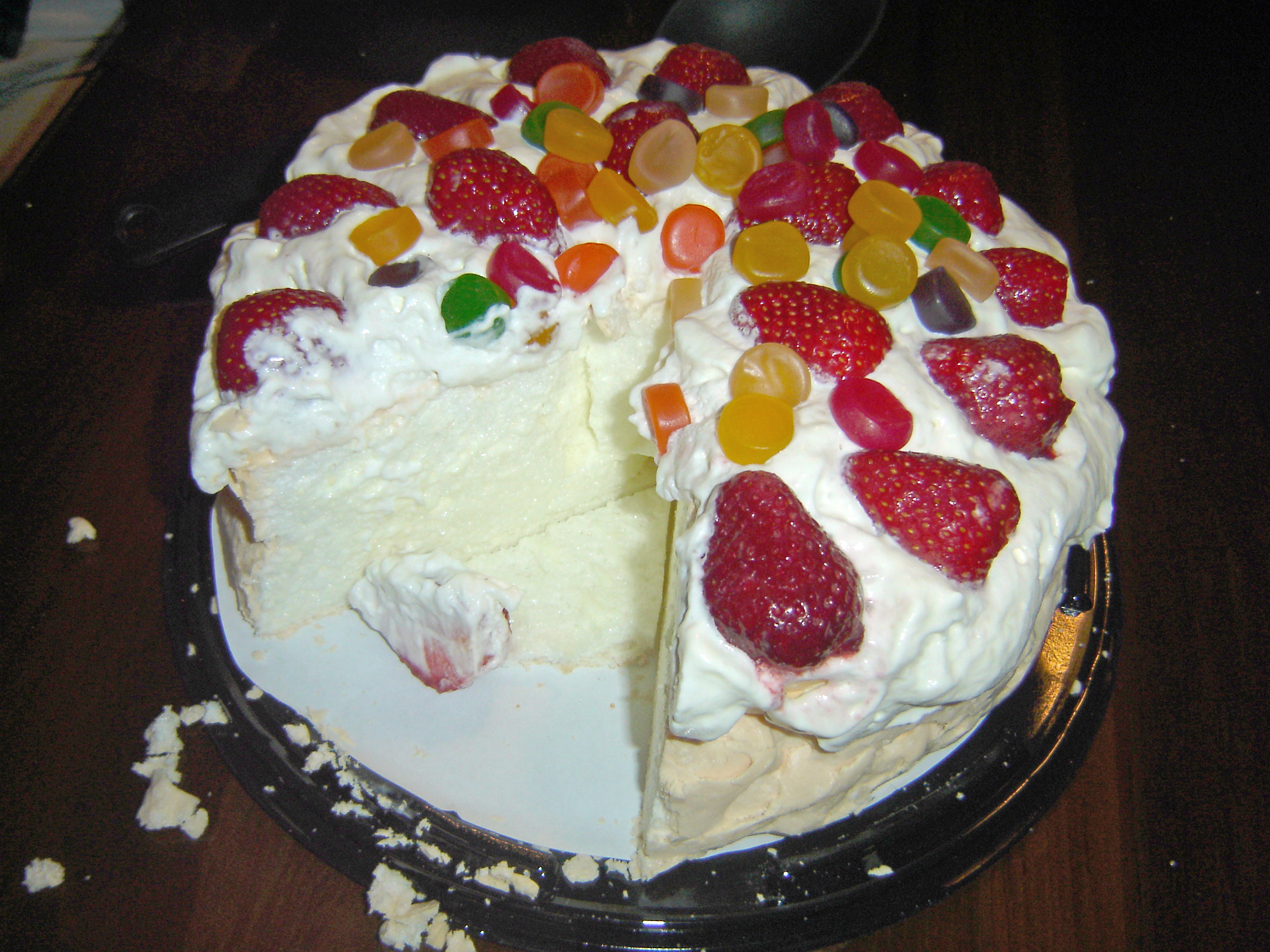
A store-bought New Zealand pavlova decorated with wine gums, strawberries and cream. The soft marshmallow-like centre is visible.

== In culture ==
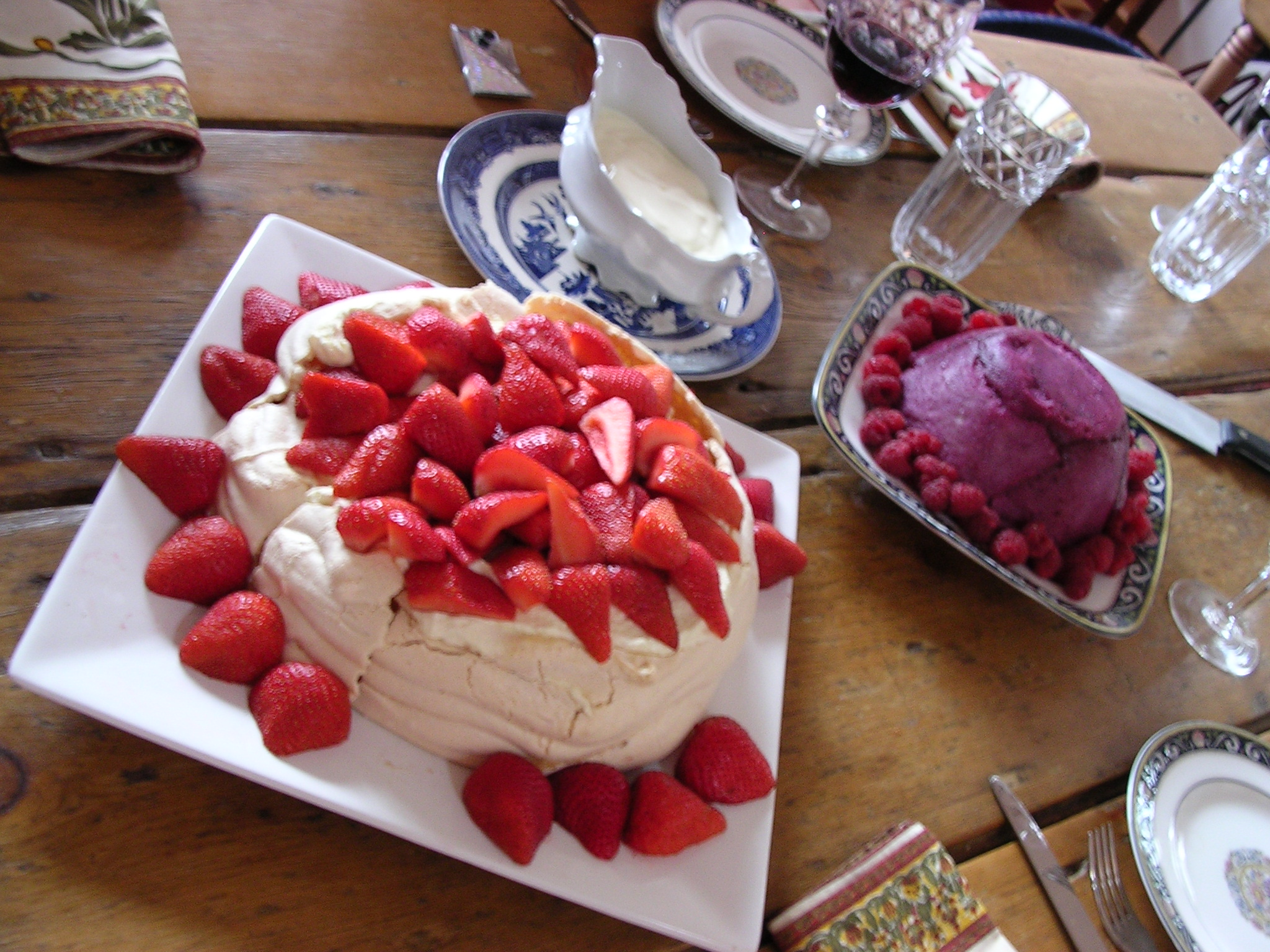
An Australian Christmas dessert pavlova garnished with strawberries

Pavlova is popular on Christmas Day as a dessert usually served after being refrigerated due to Christmas being celebrated during the summer in the southern hemisphere.

=== World's largest pavlova ===
Te Papa, New Zealand's national museum in Wellington, celebrated its first birthday in February 1999 with the creation of purportedly the world's largest pavlova, dubbed Pavzilla, which was cut by Prime Minister Jenny Shipley. This record was broken by students at the Eastern Institute of Technology in Hawke's Bay, New Zealand, in March 2005. Their creation, Pavkong, stretched 64 metres (210 ft) long in comparison to Te Papa's 45-metre-long (148 ft) pavlova. In August 2010, chef Aaron Campbell displayed a 50-square-metre (540 sq ft) rugby-themed pavlova, with the Bledisloe Cup in the centre, in the ChristChurch Cathedral in Christchurch, to raise money for the official charity of the All Blacks. In May 2018, a Norwegian chef and 35 assistants produced an 85-square-metre (910 sq ft) pavlova.

== See also ==
- Brazo de Mercedes
- Christmas in Australia
- Christmas in New Zealand
- Eton mess
- List of strawberry dishes
