= Nieves Barragán Mohacho =

Spanish chef

- Born: Bilbao, Basque Country
- Culinary career
- Rating: Michelin stars
- Current restaurants: Sabor; Legado
- Previous restaurants: Fino; Barrafina

Nieves Barragán Mohacho is a Spanish chef who holds two Michelin stars for her restaurants Sabor and Legado, having also achieved one while executive head chef at Barrafina Dean Street in London, England.

== Career ==
Nieves Barragán Mohacho was born and raised in the city of Bilbao within the Basque Country in Spain. Her mother included her in the preparation of food from an early age to keep Barragán occupied. By the time she was seven, she was preparing meals herself.

In 2003, she joined the restaurant Fino prior to opening as a sous chef, becoming head chef after four years. When the owners also opened Barrafina in 2008, she became executive head chef of both restaurants. Barrafina was awarded a Michelin star in 2013. While at Barrafina, she wrote a cookbook based on the menu there. In 2017, Mohacho was named as one of the 500 most influential people in the United Kingdom by Debrett's, within the food and drink list.

Mohacho left Fino and Barrafina at the end of February 2017, to pursue the opening of her own restaurant. She aimed to serve traditional Spanish cuisine which wasn't just tapas. She held a one-night preview demonstration of the menu at the new restaurant as part of London Restaurant Week in 2017.

Her new restaurant, Sabor, was launched in October 2017 in Heddon Street, London. She has been financially backed by the Sethi family, who have also invested in Michelin-starred Indian restaurants Gymkhana and Trishna. Joining Mohacho at Sabor is Jose Etura, formerly Barrafina's group general manager. As with Barrafina, Mohacho has also written a cookbook based on the menu at Sabor.

In August 2025, she opened a new restaurant, Legado, in Shoreditch. Legado was awarded a Michelin star in February 2026.
