= The Great Kenyan Bake Off season 1 =

TV series

The Great Kenyan Bake Off
- Season 1
- Presented by: Nick Ndeda; June Gachui
- Judges: Kiran Jethwa; Myra Ndungu
- No. of episodes: 10

Release
- Original release: 7 October – 9 December 2019

Season 1 of The Great Kenyan Bake Off aired in Kenya and saw twelve home bakers take part in a bake-off to test every aspect of their baking skills as they battled to be crowned The Great Kenyan Bake Off's best amateur baker. Each week saw keen bakers put through two challenges in a particular discipline. The season aired from 7 October 2019 until 9 December 2019. The season was won by Rosemary Akoth Ligondo, with Adeline Prima Serrao and Samira Ali and runners-up.

== The Bakers ==
Baker	Age	Occupation
Adeline Prima Serrao	27	Medical Student
Alice Adhiambo Brunsnaes	34	Homeschool Online Teacher
Charity Kahuki	34	—N/a
David Wambunya	18	Student
Faith Wangui Chege	38	Interior Designer
Jamil Walji	35	Artist
Kamini Vaghjiani	40	Air Stewardess
Loise Awuor	33	Food and Nutrition Teacher
Nobella Nyarari Ejiofor	20	Actuarial Science Student
Philip Kombo	25	Singer/Songwriter
Rosemary Akoth Ligondo	34	Nutrition Brand and Medical Events Activations Manager
Samira Ali	44	—N/a

== Results summary ==
Elimination chart
Baker	1	2	3	4	5	6	7	8	9	10
Rosemary		SB						SB	SB	WINNER
Adeline					SB	SB	SB			Runner-Up
Samira	SB									Runner-Up
Jamil									OUT	
Faith				SB				OUT		
Alice			SB				OUT			
Philip						OUT				
Loise					OUT					
Charity				OUT						
Nobella				OUT						
David		OUT								
Kamini	OUT									

NOTE: No one was eliminated in week 3, so two contestants were eliminated in week 4.

Colour key:

Got through to the next round
Awarded Star Baker
The baker was eliminated
Series Runner-up
Series Winner

== Episodes ==
Baker eliminated
Star Baker
Winner

=== Episode 1: Cake Week ===
Baker	Technical (Swiss Roll with Jam)	Showstopper ("Get to Know You" Cake)
Adeline	1st	Funfetti and Chocolate Cake
Alice	10th	Cakelogs inspired from Denmark
Charity	9th	Chocolate Orange Drip Cake
David	8th	Modern Layered Neapolitan Cake
Faith	6th	Orange Chocolate Cake
Jamil	7th	Lemon Vanilla Poundcake
Kamini	12th	Pistachio and Cardamom Mousse Cake
Loise	2nd	"I am Limitless" Cake
Nobella	11th	Ocean Rainbow Cake
Philip	5th	White Chocolate and Cardamom Cake
Rosemary	4th	"Mama's Love" Fruitcake
Samira	3rd	Supermoist Chocolate Cake Treasurebox

=== Episode 2: Bread Week ===
Baker	Showstopper (Decorative Loaf)	Technical (Focaccia)
Adeline	Kenyan Sun Brioche	1st
Alice	Sunflower Bread	9th
Charity	Christmas Morning Monkeybread	11th
David	Cranberry, Vanilla & Cinnamon Bread Tower	10th
Faith	Decorative Flower Loaf	8th
Jamil	Greek inspired Monkeybread	6th
Loise	Turtles at the Pond	7th
Nobella	Cinnamon Bread Basket	3rd
Philip	Brioche with Apricot Jam	4th
Rosemary	Braided Bread Basket	2nd
Samira	Flower Bread	5th

=== Episode 3: Tea Week ===
Baker	Technical (Brownies)	Signature (12 Tea Cupcakes)
Adeline	7th	"High Tea"; Cardamom & Tree Tomato; Black Tea with Rosemary & Ginger; Gin & Tonic
Alice	1st	"Assorted Cupcakes"; Piña Colada & Lemoncurd; Lemon & Ginger Tea; Coffee with Cascara
Charity	6th	"Ladies Tea Party"; Pink Gin & Tonic; Chocolate Mint; Earl Grey with Chocolate
Faith	3rd	"Love of Nature"; Blueberry; Chocolate & Mint; Bubblegum
Jamil	5th	"Assorted Cupcakes"; Dark Chocolate & Mint; Lemon & Buttercream; Masala Chai & Buttercream
Loise	10th	"Heaven on Earth"; Chocolate Truffle on Lemon Meringue; Salted Caramel; Earl Grey with Vanilla Frosting
Nobella	4th	"Farm Cupcakes"; Lemon & Buttercream; Chocolate Mint; Coconut & Chocolate
Philip	2nd	"Mini-Succulent Garden"; Vanilla with Lemongrass Tea Filling; Chocolate & Peanut Butter; Strawberry Surprise
Rosemary	8th	"Kids' Favourites"; Cookie Dough; Blueberry Streusel; Matcha Tea & White Chocolate
Samira	9th	"Assorted Cupcakes"; Green Tea & Mint Chocolate; Coconut; Red Velvet

NOTE: The judges decided not to eliminate anyone this week, as there were 3 people on the chopping block and they couldn't decide.

=== Episode 4: Pie Week ===
Baker	Technical (Lemon Meringue Pie)	Signature (Savoury Family Pie)
Adeline	4th	Beef, Bacon, Carrot and Butternut Family Pie
Alice	8th	Spinach & Ricotta Pie
Charity	10th	Chicken & Bacon Pot Pie
Faith	3rd	Creamy Chicken & Vegetable Pie
Jamil	2nd	Chicken & Mushroom Warka Pastry Pie
Loise	6th	Mushroom, Sausage, Apple and Chicken Love Pie
Nobella	9th	Chicken & Cheese Family Pie
Philip	5th	Bacon, Leek and Vegetable Pie
Rosemary	7th	Vegetable Samosa Pie
Samira	1st	Chicken Pot Pie

NOTE: Since no one was eliminated in week 3, this week there were two contestants eliminated.

=== Episode 5: Dessert Week ===
Baker	Technical (Chocolate Fondant)	Signature (Trifle)
Adeline	5th	"Ode to Coffee"; Roulade & Ladyfingers; Hazelnut Cream; Whipped Cream
Alice	1st	"Macaroons Trifle"; Danish Macaroons; Custard; Mascarpone & Meringue; Almond & Prune Compote
Faith	6th	"Classic Trifle"; Sponge Cake; Passionfruit, Vanilla Custard; Grapes, Raspberries, Kiwi; Vanilla Cream
Jamil	3rd	"Floral Trifle"; Roulade Soaked in Sherry & Passion Fruit; Pineapple, Kiwi Custard; Peaches & Fresh Cream
Loise	7th	"Gingerbread Trifle"; Gingerbread; Boozy Dark Chocolate Crème Patissière; Whipped Cream; Strawberry, Candied Orange Peel
Philip	2nd	"Chocolate & Butterscotch"; Chocolate Ladyfingers; Whipped Cream; Butterscotch Custard & Peppermint Honeycomb; Raspberry & Mint
Rosemary	8th	"Chocolate & Pear"; Pear Poached in Vanilla Bean Syrup; Chantilly; Chocolate Ganache; White Chocolate Diplomat Cream
Samira	4th	"Fruit Trifle"; Jelly, Strawberry, Sponge; Blueberry Compote, Pineapple; Mascarpone Whipping Cream; Strawberry Slices

=== Episode 6: Pastry Week ===
Baker	Technical (Bacon, Mushroom and Tomato Quiche)	Signature (Sweet Tart)
Adeline	1st	Pear & Honey Tart
Alice	2nd	Strawberry Marzipan Tart
Faith	3rd	Classic Fruit Tart
Jamil	5th	Arabic Nut Seduction Tart
Philip	4th	Chocolate Cranberry Tart
Rosemary	7th	Mixed Fruit & Nut Tart
Samira	6th	Fresh Fruit Tartlets

=== Episode 7: Biscuit Week ===
Baker	Technical (Checkerboard Biscuits)	Showstopper (Gingerbread Structure)
Adeline	3rd	Thai Temple
Alice	6th	Volcano
Faith	5th	Piano
Jamil	1st	Mosque
Rosemary	2nd	Fort Jesus
Samira	4th	Canopy Bed

=== Episode 8: Gluten Free Week ===
Baker	Technical (Ugali Cake)	Signature (Cheesecake)
Adeline	2nd	Dulce de Leche Cheesecake
Faith	4th	Ocean New York Cheesecake
Jamil	5th	Baklava Saffron Twist Cheesecake
Rosemary	1st	Blueberry Lemon Cheesecake
Samira	3rd	New York Cheesecake

=== Episode 9: Semi-Final ===
Baker	Technical (12 Macarons)	Showstopper (Choux Pastry Tower)
Adeline	2nd	Strawberry, Lychee & Rose Profiterole & Mandazi Tower
Jamil	4th	Vanilla & Sweet Banana Profiteroles & Kaimati Tower
Rosemary	1st	Chocolate & Lemon Curd Profiterole & Mandazi Tower
Samira	3rd	Strawberry & Coconut Profiterole & Mandazi Tower

=== Episode 10: Final ===
Baker	Technical (Schichttorte)	Showstopper (Three-Tiered Wedding Cake)
Adeline	2nd	Geode Fault Line Wedding Cake
Rosemary	1st	Semi-Naked Lace Detailed Wedding Cake
Samira	3rd	Black & Gold Wedding Cake
