= The Great British Bake Off =

British television baking competition

- Title card (2010–2025)
- Genre: Baking; Reality
- Directed by: Jeanette Goulbourn; Nicholas Berry; Andy Devonshire; Scott Tankard
- Presented by: Mel Giedroyc; Sue Perkins; Noel Fielding; Sandi Toksvig; Matt Lucas; Alison Hammond
- Judges: Paul Hollywood; Mary Berry; Prue Leith; Nigella Lawson
- Theme music composer: Tom Howe
- Country of origin: United Kingdom
- Original language: English
- No. of series: 17
- No. of episodes: 163 (and 43 specials)

Production
- Executive producers: Anna Beattie; Richard McKerrow; Sarah Thomson-Woolley; Kieran Smith
- Producers: Byron Archard; Samantha Beddoes; Amanda Westwood
- Production locations: Cotswolds, Scone Palace, Sandwich, Bakewell, Mousehole, Fulham Palace; Valentines Mansion; Harptree Court; Welford Park; Down Hall
- Running time: 60 minutes
- Production company: Love Productions

Original release
- Network: BBC Two
- Release: 17 August 2010 – 22 October 2013
- Network: BBC One
- Release: 6 August 2014 – 26 October 2016
- Network: Channel 4
- Release: 29 August 2017 – present

Related
- Bake Off: The Professionals; The Great British Bake Off: An Extra Slice; Junior Bake Off; The Great British Bake Off: Second Helpings

The Great British Bake Off (often abbreviated to Bake Off or GBBO) is a British television baking competition, produced by Love Productions, in which a group of amateur bakers compete against each other in a series of rounds, attempting to impress two judges with their baking skills. One contestant is eliminated in each round, and the winner is selected from the three contestants who reach the final.

The first episode was aired on 17 August 2010, with its first four series broadcast on BBC Two, until its growing popularity led the BBC to move it to BBC One for the next three series. After its seventh series, Love Productions signed a three-year deal with Channel 4 to produce the series for the broadcaster. On 22 September 2026, it was announced that The Great British Bake Off has been renewed for its eighteenth series in 2027.

The series is credited with reinvigorating interest in baking throughout the United Kingdom and Ireland, with shops in the UK reporting sharp rises in sales of baking ingredients and accessories. Many of its participants, including winners, have gone on to careers in baking, while the BAFTA award-winning program has spawned a number of specials and spin-off shows: a celebrity charity series in aid of Sport Relief/Comic Relief or Stand Up to Cancer; Junior Bake Off for young children (broadcast on the CBBC channel, then on Channel 4 from 2019); after-show series An Extra Slice; and Bake Off: The Professionals for teams of pastry chefs.

The series has proven popular abroad; in the United States and Canada, where "Bake-Off" is a trademark owned by Pillsbury, it airs as The Great British Baking Show. The series format has been sold globally for production of localised versions, and was adapted for both BBC Two series The Great British Sewing Bee and The Great Pottery Throw Down.

== Background ==
=== Development ===
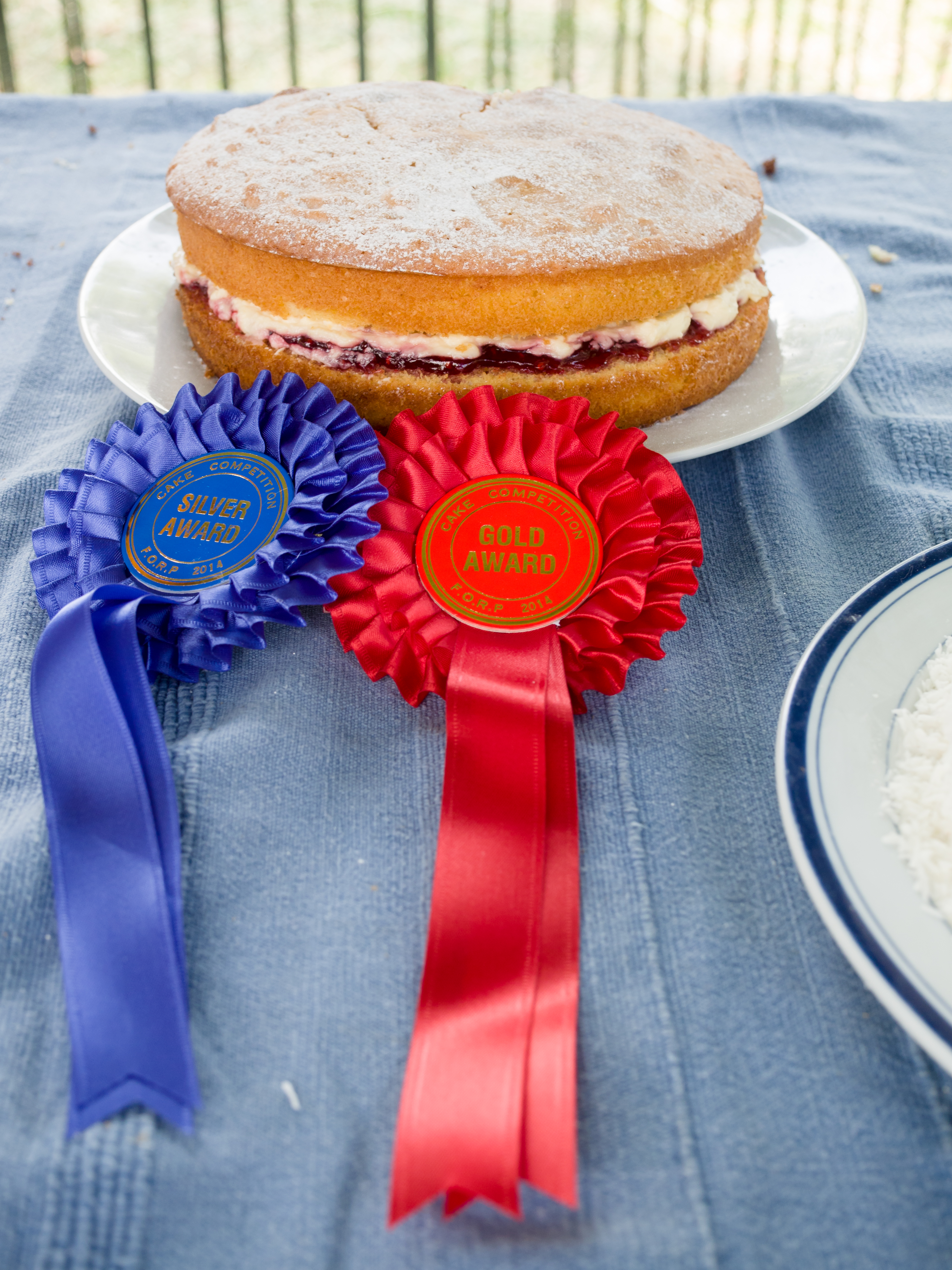
Competitive baking, such as making Victoria sponge (pictured), is part of the classic English village fête which inspired the series.

The baking competition was conceived by producer Anna Beattie after she spoke to a friend who had seen 'bake-offs' in America. Beattie was also inspired by the classic English village fête baking competitions; she said: "I loved that idea of village fetes and an old-fashioned baking competition with people who only wanted to bake a good cake." However, Beattie failed to interest any channel in the idea for four years.

In early 2009, they pitched the idea to Janice Hadlow, then controller of BBC Two. The pitch was successful, and Hadlow and Commissioning Editor Charlotte Moore commissioned the programme, which was then developed over the next six months. The development team first selected Mary Berry as a judge, and following an audition Paul Hollywood was also appointed. Sue Perkins and Mel Giedroyc were approached to be presenters of the show.

=== Production ===
Reproducing the surroundings of the English village fête, the series is filmed in bunting-draped marquees in scenic gardens. In the first series, the filming locations varied in different episodes, but only one location was used for each series from the second series onwards. The series is normally filmed over a 12 to 13 weeks period, and the filming usually takes place over the weekends with the exception of series 11 when filming was shortened to six weeks due to the COVID-19 pandemic.

Amateur bakers who apply to appear in the show are first assessed by a researcher, followed by an audition in London with two of their bakes. They then undergo a screen test and an interview with a producer. A second audition involves the applicants baking two recipes for the judges in front of the cameras. After a psychological evaluation, between 10 and 13 applicants are selected for the show, with two further bakers on standby should any of those selected drop out. What the bakers intended to bake during a particular challenge is illustrated using animated graphics. These graphics have been created by illustrator Tom Hovey since the show's inception in 2010.

=== Broadcast and personnel changes ===
On 17 August 2010, the first episode of The Great British Bake Off was shown on BBC Two. It stayed on BBC Two for four years, grew in popularity and became the most popular programme on that channel. In its fifth series it was moved to BBC One where it stayed for three years. It was the most-watched programme on British television in 2015 and 2016. Following extended negotiations, Love Productions announced that the seventh series of the show would be the last broadcast by the BBC. On 12 September 2016, Love agreed to a three-year deal to broadcast the show on Channel 4. Despite the move, BBC Studios retains global distribution and format rights to the series except in North America and are set for renewal in 2028.

Giedroyc and Perkins subsequently announced that they would not be returning when the show moved to its new network. On 22 September 2016, Berry announced that she would also be leaving the show when it moved to Channel 4, while Hollywood later announced he would stay. In March 2017, it was announced that Prue Leith would join Hollywood as a judge, while Noel Fielding and Sandi Toksvig would take over as presenters. After 3 years presenting the show, Toksvig announced her departure in 2020, and was replaced by Matt Lucas. On 6 December 2022, Lucas announced that he would be leaving the show after three series. On 17 March 2023, it was confirmed that Alison Hammond would replace Lucas as a presenter. On 21 January 2026 Prue Leith announced her departure in an Instagram post. Nigella Lawson was confirmed to be her replacement on 26 January.

== Format ==
The programme operates on a weekly elimination process to find the best all-around baker from the contestants, who are all amateurs. Ten contestants were chosen for the first series and twelve in each series thereafter, apart from the fourth and tenth when thirteen bakers competed.

In each episode, the amateur bakers are given three challenges based on that week's theme: a signature bake, a technical challenge, and a show-stopper. The three challenges take place over two days, and the filming takes up to 16 hours a day. Except for Series 9, the first week of the competition was usually "Cake Week". The contestants are assessed by the judges who then choose a "Star Baker" for the week (introduced in series 2), and a contestant is also eliminated although if the contestant numbers in certain years are not even or there is a non-elimination a week before, then two bakers may be eliminated. In the final round, three bakers are left and a winner is chosen from the three.

Signature Challenge
This challenge is for the amateur bakers to show off their tried-and-tested recipes for bakes they might make for their friends and family.
Technical Challenge
This challenge requires enough technical knowledge and experience to produce a certain finished product when given only limited – or even minimal – instructions. The bakers are all given the same recipe and are not told beforehand what the challenge will be. The finished products are judged blind and ranked from worst to best. The bakers place their bakes on a table behind photos of themselves.
Showstopper Challenge
This challenge is for the bakers to show off their skills and talent. The judges favour a bake that has a professional appearance but is also outstanding in flavours.

In the first series, the location of the cast and crew moved from town to town each week, but from the second series, the competition is held in one location in a specially constructed marquee. Interspersed in the programme are the backgrounds of the contestants as well as, in the earlier series, video vignettes on the history of baking.

== Series overview ==
Series	Episodes	Location	Presenters	Judges	Originally released	Network	Winner	UK viewers (millions)
1	6	Various (Note: Each episode of the first series was set in a new location. Cotswolds, Scone Palace, Sandwich, Bakewell, Mousehole, Fulham Palace were all hosts for an episode.)	Mel Giedroyc & Sue Perkins	Paul Hollywood & Mary Berry	17 August – 21 September 2010	BBC Two	Edd Kimber	2.77
2	8	Valentines Mansion	Mel Giedroyc & Sue Perkins	Paul Hollywood & Mary Berry	16 August – 4 October 2011	BBC Two	Joanne Wheatley	3.95
3	10	Harptree Court	Mel Giedroyc & Sue Perkins	Paul Hollywood & Mary Berry	14 August – 16 October 2012	BBC Two	John Whaite	5.00
4	10	Harptree Court	Mel Giedroyc & Sue Perkins	Paul Hollywood & Mary Berry	20 August – 22 October 2013	BBC Two	Frances Quinn	7.35
5	10	Welford Park	Mel Giedroyc & Sue Perkins	Paul Hollywood & Mary Berry	6 August – 8 October 2014	BBC One	Nancy Birtwhistle	10.04
6	10	Welford Park	Mel Giedroyc & Sue Perkins	Paul Hollywood & Mary Berry	5 August – 7 October 2015	BBC One	Nadiya Hussain	12.31
7	10	Welford Park	Mel Giedroyc & Sue Perkins	Paul Hollywood & Mary Berry	24 August – 26 October 2016	BBC One	Candice Brown	13.56
8	10	Welford Park	Noel Fielding & Sandi Toksvig	Paul Hollywood & Prue Leith	29 August – 31 October 2017	Channel 4	Sophie Faldo	9.01
9	10	Welford Park	Noel Fielding & Sandi Toksvig	Paul Hollywood & Prue Leith	28 August – 30 October 2018	Channel 4	Rahul Mandal	9.29
10	10	Welford Park	Noel Fielding & Sandi Toksvig	Paul Hollywood & Prue Leith	27 August – 29 October 2019	Channel 4	David Atherton	9.24
11	10	Down Hall	Noel Fielding & Matt Lucas	Paul Hollywood & Prue Leith	22 September – 24 November 2020	Channel 4	Peter Sawkins	10.87
12	10	Down Hall	Noel Fielding & Matt Lucas	Paul Hollywood & Prue Leith	21 September – 23 November 2021	Channel 4	Giuseppe Dell'Anno	9.10
13	10	Welford Park	Noel Fielding & Matt Lucas	Paul Hollywood & Prue Leith	13 September – 15 November 2022	Channel 4	Syabira Yusoff	7.79
14	10	Welford Park	Noel Fielding & Alison Hammond	Paul Hollywood & Prue Leith	26 September – 28 November 2023	Channel 4	Matty Edgell	6.89
15	10	Welford Park	Noel Fielding & Alison Hammond	Paul Hollywood & Prue Leith	24 September – 26 November 2024	Channel 4	Georgie Grasso	7.40
16	10	Welford Park	Noel Fielding & Alison Hammond	Paul Hollywood & Prue Leith	2 September – 4 November 2025	Channel 4	Jasmine Mitchell	6.89
17	10	Welford Park	Noel Fielding & Alison Hammond	Paul Hollywood & Nigella Lawson	22 September – 24 November 2026	Channel 4	TBA	TBA

=== Series 1 (2010) ===
Series 1 of The Great British Bake Off saw ten home bakers take part in a bake-off to test their baking skills as they battled to be crowned the Great British Bake Off's best amateur baker. Each week the nationwide tour saw the bakers put through three challenges in a particular discipline. The rounds took place in various locations across the UK, with the final round being held at Fulham Palace, London. Mel Giedroyc has subsequently indicated that during the initial filming, she was uncomfortable with how the bakers were treated and contacted her agent, to get her released from the show. As a result and following a meeting, production changes were made to ensure that the bakers had a kinder experience and Giedroyc agreed to stay on as a presenter.

The three finalists were Ruth Clemens, Miranda Gore Browne, and Edd Kimber. On 21 September 2010, Kimber was crowned the best amateur baker.

=== Series 2 (2011) ===
The number of amateur baker contestants increased to twelve for the second series. Unlike Series 1, this year The Great British Bake Off stayed in one location – Valentines Mansion, a 17th-century mansion house in Redbridge, London.

The finalists were Holly Bell, Mary-Anne Boermans, and the winning contestant Joanne Wheatley.

=== Series 3 (2012) ===
The third series of The Great British Bake Off began on 14 August 2012. The series was filmed at Harptree Court in East Harptree, Somerset.

The finalists were Brendan Lynch, James Morton and John Whaite, the last of whom won the final in a surprise result.

In the US, the third series was broadcast as season 5 on PBS, and on Netflix as The Great British Baking Show: The Beginnings.

=== Series 4 (2013) ===
The fourth series of The Great British Bake Off started on 20 August 2013 on BBC Two. The series was again filmed at Harptree Court in East Harptree, Somerset. The final was won by Frances Quinn, with Ruby Tandoh and Kimberley Wilson as runners up.

In the US, the fourth series was broadcast as season 2 on PBS, and on Netflix as Collection 2.

=== Series 5 (2014) ===
The fifth series of The Great British Bake Off began airing on 6 August 2014 on BBC One. This series was filmed at Welford Park in Berkshire. There were twelve bakers taking part. Mary Berry and Paul Hollywood returned as judges, whilst Sue Perkins and Mel Giedroyc continued to present the series. Richard Burr was awarded the largest number of star baker designations of any series so far but was beaten by Nancy Birtwhistle in the final.

A spin-off show The Great British Bake Off: An Extra Slice, hosted by comedian Jo Brand on BBC Two, was also launched as a companion series in the same year. Each episode was broadcast two days after the main show but later moved to the same night. The show includes interviews with eliminated contestants.

In the US, the fifth series was broadcast as season 1 on PBS, and on Netflix as Collection 1.

=== Series 6 (2015) ===
The sixth series began on 5 August 2015 on BBC One, again from Welford Park in Berkshire. The spin-off show The Great British Bake Off: An Extra Slice returned for a second series, with Jo Brand as host. This series was won by Nadiya Hussain, with Ian Cumming and Tamal Ray as runners up.

In the US, the sixth series was broadcast as season 3 on PBS, and on Netflix as Collection 3.

=== Series 7 (2016) ===
The seventh series began on 24 August 2016 on BBC One, once again from Welford Park in Berkshire, a later than usual start following the BBC's coverage of the Olympic Games. This series was won by Candice Brown, with Jane Beedle and Andrew Smyth as runners up.

In the US, the seventh series was broadcast as season 4 on PBS, and on Netflix as Collection 4.

=== Series 8 (2017) ===
The eighth series of The Great British Bake Off began airing on 29 August 2017. This is the first series of The Great British Bake Off to be broadcast on Channel 4 following its move from the BBC. The series features new hosts Noel Fielding and Sandi Toksvig, and new judge Prue Leith along with returning judge Paul Hollywood. This series was won by Sophie Faldo, with Kate Lyon and Steven Carter-Bailey finishing as runners-up.

The eighth series is broadcast on Netflix as Collection 5.

=== Series 9 (2018) ===
The ninth series of The Great British Bake Off began airing on 28 August 2018.

On 30 October 2018, Sheffield University researcher Rahul Mandal, from Rotherham, was announced as the winner of The Great British Bake Off 2018. The runners-up were Ruby Bhogal and Kim-Joy Hewlett.

The ninth series is broadcast on Netflix as Collection 6.

=== Series 10 (2019) ===
The tenth series of The Great British Bake Off began airing on 27 August 2019. On 29 October 2019, David Atherton was announced as the winner of The Great British Bake Off 2019, becoming the first winner never to have won Star Baker during the competition. The runners-up were Steph Blackwell and Alice Fevronia.

The tenth series is broadcast on Netflix as Collection 7.

=== Series 11 (2020) ===
The eleventh series of The Great British Bake Off began airing on 22 September 2020. Matt Lucas replaced Sandi Toksvig as host, alongside returning host Noel Fielding and judges Prue Leith and Paul Hollywood. The first three episodes ran for 90 minutes rather than the previous 75 minutes. Due to the COVID-19 pandemic, filming was shortened to six weeks. The cast and crew had to live in a "self-contained biosphere", which was Down Hall Hotel in Bishop's Stortford where a marquee was put up in its garden for the competition. On 24 November 2020, it was announced that this series was won by Peter Sawkins, with Laura Adlington and Dave Friday finishing as the runners-up.

The eleventh series was broadcast on Netflix as Collection 8, released weekly three days after the UK air date.

=== Series 12 (2021) ===
The twelfth series began airing on Tuesday 21 September 2021. The twelfth series was broadcast on Netflix as Collection 9, released weekly three days after the UK air date.

On 23 November 2021, Giuseppe Dell'Anno was announced as the winner, becoming the first Italian to win the programme. The runners-up were Chigs Parmar and Crystelle Pereira.

=== Series 13 (2022) ===
The thirteenth series of the Great British Bake Off began airing on Tuesday 13 September 2022 on Channel 4. The thirteenth series was broadcast on Netflix as Collection 10, released weekly three days after the UK air date.

On 15 November 2022, Syabira Yusoff was announced as the winner of the programme. The runners-up were Sandro Farmhouse and Abdul Rehman.

=== Series 14 (2023) ===
The Great British Bake Off began airing on Tuesday 26 September 2023 on Channel 4 with Alison Hammond replacing Matt Lucas as host alongside Noel Fielding. The fourteenth series was broadcast on Netflix as Collection 11, released weekly on Fridays three days after the UK air date.

On 28 November 2023, Matty Edgel was announced as the winner of the programme. The runners-up were Josh Smalley and Dan Hunter.

=== Series 15 (2024) ===
The Great British Bake Off returned on Tuesday 24 September 2024 on Channel 4 with returning hosts Alison Hammond and Noel Fielding. The fifteenth series was broadcast on Netflix as Collection 12, released weekly three days after the UK air date.

On 26 November 2024, Georgie Grasso was announced as the winner of the programme. The runners-up were Dylan Bachelet and Christiaan de Vries.

=== Series 16 (2025) ===
The Great British Bake Off returned on 2 September 2025 on Channel 4 with returning hosts Alison Hammond and Noel Fielding for its sixteenth series. The sixteenth series was broadcast on Netflix as Collection 13, released weekly three days after the air date.

On 4 November 2025, Jasmine Mitchell was announced as the winner of the programme. The runners-up were Aaron Mountford-Myles and Tom Arden.

=== Series 17 (2026) ===
On 21 January 2026, Prue Leith announced her intention to step down as a judge after nine years. On 26 January, Nigella Lawson was confirmed to be replacing Leith. The seventeenth series began on 22 September 2026 on Channel 4 with returning hosts Alison Hammond and Noel Fielding.

== Incomplete bakes and other incidents ==
Periodically, accidents and other errors have influenced the results of a round of judging. Several have had a significant impact on what a baker presents, notably:

- Presenters Mel Giedroyc and Sue Perkins accidentally interfered with several bakes. In Series 4, Sue leaned on Howard Middleton's English muffins in the technical challenge, and in Series 6, she broke Nadiya Hussain's biscuit lid in the showstopper challenge.
- In Series 2, Robert Billington accidentally dropped his tiered showstopper while applying finishing touches to the cake. Both judges and presenters came to his aid to salvage the bottom tier of his cake. He was able to present the incomplete showstopper as a single-tiered cake.
- In Series 3, John Whaite was unable to complete his bake after he suffered a severe cut to his finger from a food processor. He tried to continue working on his strudel wearing a rubber glove, but the bleeding required medical attention, including assistance from Danny, who left her bake to help him. As a result, John had to abandon the last bake, and no one was eliminated that week.
- In Series 4, contestant Deborah Manger accidentally used Howard Middleton's custard instead of her own. As a result, Howard was forced to use Deborah's custard, and this was taken into account by the judges, who judged the trifles and custards individually.
- In Series 5, during the Baked Alaska challenge, contestant Diana Beard removed Iain Watters's ice cream from a freezer in order to make room for her dessert. Upon discovering his melted ice cream on the counter, Watters threw it into the bin in frustration and left the tent. He returned shortly after, and as he had no cake for judging; he produced his bin instead, leading to his elimination. The event provoked anger from many viewers, who believed Diana Beard had interfered with his ice cream, causing it to melt.
- In Series 9, one of contestant Rahul Mandal's empty storage jars burst from the heat within the tent and glass covered the workbench and potentially contaminated the mixtures. The production team had to dispose of all of his mixtures and clear his station. He was then given an extra fifteen minutes after the other finalists had finished to make up for the time he had lost.
- In Series 11, during the technical challenge of the first episode, contestant Sura Selvarajah accidentally knocked over four of David Friday's pineapple upside down cakes as he was putting them on the gingham table. Paul and Prue were informed of the incident and judged the cakes based on the two which remained intact.
- In Series 14, Tasha Stones had to abandon the technical challenge halfway through and could not participate in the showstopper due to illness. As a result, no one was eliminated that week.
- In Series 15, Jeff Thomas had to withdraw from Cake Week after the signature due to illness. As a result, no one was eliminated. Jeff withdrew from the competition the following week, again due to illness.
- In Series 17, Shannon Amy was unable to participate in the showstopper due to illness. As a result, no one was eliminated that week.

== The Great Christmas / Festive Bake Off ==
Since 2016, two Christmas specials have been transmitted between each series. The special will typically feature four returning bakers from the previous series (six in the first 2023 special and the second 2024 special, eight in the second 2025 special) to compete in three Christmas-themed challenges (excluding the second 2019 special which featured the cast of the sitcom Derry Girls, the first 2021 special which featured the cast of the drama It's a Sin, the first 2022 special which featured Channel 4 legends to commemorate the channel's 40th anniversary, the first 2024 special which featured soap opera stars, and the first 2025 special which featured the cast of the sitcom Peep Show). Since 2017 (following the move from BBC), one special is broadcast on Christmas Eve or Christmas Day and the other on New Year's Day on Channel 4.

Series	Edition	Winner	Other contestants
2016	Regular	Mary-Anne Boermans (series 2)	Cathryn Dresser (series 3), Ali Imdad (series 4), Norman Calder (series 5)
2016	Regular	Chetna Makan (series 5)	Janet Basu (series 2), James Morton (series 3), Howard Middleton (series 4)
2017	Regular	Paul Jagger (series 6)	Beca Lyne-Pirkis (series 4), Selasi Gbormittah (series 7), Val Stones (series 7)
2017	Regular	Rav Bansal (series 7)	Rob Billington (series 2), Sandy Docherty (series 6), Benjamina Ebuehi (series 7)
2018	Regular	Jane Beedle (series 7)	Andrew Smyth (series 7), Flo Atkins (series 8), Liam Charles (series 8)
2018	Regular	Steven Carter-Bailey (series 8)	Kate Henry (series 5), Tamal Ray (series 6), Candice Brown (series 7)
2019	Regular	Briony Williams (series 9)	Tom Hetherington (series 8), Yan Tsou (series 8), Terry Hartill (series 9)
2019	Derry Girls	Saoirse-Monica Jackson	Dylan Llewellyn, Jamie-Lee O'Donnell, Nicola Coughlan, Siobhán McSweeney
2020	Regular	Rosie Brandreth-Poynter (series 10)	James Hillery (series 8), Ruby Bhogal (series 9), Jamie Finn (series 10)
2020	Regular	Rahul Mandal (series 9)	Nancy Birtwhistle (series 5), Helena Garcia (series 10), Henry Bird (series 10)
2021	It's a Sin	Nathaniel Curtis	Olly Alexander, Lydia West, Shaun Dooley
2021	Regular	Kim-Joy Hewlett (series 9)	Jon Jenkins (series 9), Hermine Doussou (series 11), Rowan Williams (series 11)
2022	Channel 4 legends	Miquita Oliver	Terry Christian, Tony Robinson, Gaby Roslin, Claire Sweeney
2022	Regular	Manon Lagrève (series 9)	Antony Amourdoux (series 9), Lottie Bedlow (series 11), Chigs Parmar (series 12)
2023	Regular	Sophie Faldo (series 8)	Dan Beasley-Harling (series 9), Amelia Le Bruin (series 10), Linda Rayfield (series 11), George Aristidou (series 12), Carole Edwards (series 13)
2023	Regular	Maxy Maligisa (series 13)	Mark Lutton (series 11), Jürgen Krauss (series 12), Maggie Richardson (series 12)
2024	Soap opera stars	Chris Bisson (Emmerdale)	Natalie Cassidy (EastEnders), Dean Gaffney (EastEnders), Shobna Gulati (Coronation Street), Sheree Murphy (Emmerdale and Hollyoaks)
2024	Scottish bakers (Regular)	Peter Sawkins (series 11)	Lea Harris (series 1), James Morton (series 3), Norman Calder (series 5), Kevin Flynn (series 13), Nicky Laceby (series 14)
2025	Peep Show	Olivia Colman	David Mitchell, Isy Suttie, Matt King, Sophie Winkleman
2025	Teams (Regular)	Selasi Gbormittah (series 7) & Val Stones (series 7)	Briony Williams (series 9) & Tasha Stones (series 14), Rahul Mandal (series 9) & Giuseppe Dell'Anno (series 12), Andy Ryan (series 15) & Nelly Ghaffar (series 15)

== Reception ==
=== Critical reception ===
The early reviews for the first series were mixed. Lucy Mangan of The Guardian wondered if "competitive baking [is] a contradiction in terms" and found the proceedings humourless. Iain Hollingshead of The Daily Telegraph was scathing, describing the presenters as "annoying", the judge Paul Hollywood as looking "sinister without being interesting", and that the audience would be so bored that they "could certainly forgive the cameraman if he were to commit hara-kiri in a giant pool of egg and flour."

However, reviews from the later series were more positive. Andrew Collins of The Guardian called it "the nicest show on television" and judged it the best TV programme of 2012. Rachel Ward of The Daily Telegraph thought the programme "had just the right consistency of mouth-watering morsels, good humour, and fascinating history", while Tom Sutcliffe of The Independent considered the contest "perfectly baked". Meredith Blake of Los Angeles Times wrote that the show is "Escapist entertainment at its sweetest."

Bake Off was moved to Channel 4 in 2017, and reviews of the programme on the channel were largely positive, although a few felt that it did not compare well to the BBC version. Mark Lawson of The Guardian described the programme on Channel 4 as "both exactly the same but also just subtly different enough", and that "only someone desperate to dislike the re-plated show could argued that [it] has soured, spoiled or binned its recipe". Michael Hogan of The Telegraph thought that "Mary, Mel and Sue might be gone but the show's recipe remains as winning as ever. The four Cs – chemistry, camaraderie, comedy, cakes – were all present and correct." Anna Leszkiewicz of the New Statesman however considered that while the format had been left largely unchanged and the contestants "irresistibly likeable", "every single change to the show has been for the worse".

Its American broadcast has a Metacritic rating of 88, indicating "universal acclaim".

=== Cultural impact ===
Bake Off is credited with spurring an interest in home baking, with supermarkets and department stores in the UK reporting sharp rises in sales of baking ingredients and accessories. The show is also credited with reviving Women's Institutes, whose membership reached its highest level since the 1970s. Between 2010 and 2013, the Bake Off effect had seen membership grow by a quarter to over 211,000. It was the largest impact on membership since the release of the 2003 British comedy film Calendar Girls, starring Helen Mirren and Julie Walters, where a group of middle-aged Yorkshire women produced a nude calendar to raise money for Leukaemia Research under the auspices of the Women's Institutes. Ruth Bond, chairwoman of the National Federation of Women's Institutes, said Bake Off has inspired women to take up baking by 'taking away the fear factor' and making it look fun. The show also boosted the sales of bakery books and the number of baking clubs, and independent bakeries also showed an increase. According to one analyst, more than three-fifths of adults baked at home at least once in 2013 compared with only a third in 2011.

A stage musical written by Jake Brunger and Pippa Cleary based on the series and endorsed by Love Productions opened in Cheltenham in July 2022. In addition, a whole host of similar shows started getting commissioned on TV including The Great British Sewing Bee, Forged in Fire, Lego Masters and The Great Pottery Throw Down.

=== TV ratings ===
The first series of The Great British Bake Off premiered in August 2010 with moderate ratings of just over 2 million viewers for its first episode. This was enough to place it in BBC Two's top ten for that week, and over the series the audience grew to over 3 million, with the semi-final and final both achieving first place in BBC Two's weekly ratings. During the second series, the ratings gradually increased, and it became a surprise hit with nearly 4 million watching each episode. Week two was the last time that the show was out-rated by another BBC Two programme in the same week (it came second to the drama Page Eight); from then until the show's move to BBC One, every competition episode would be the channel's number one rated programme of the week. By its final episode it had averaged 4.56 million viewers, peaking at 5.1 million in its last 15 minutes.

The ratings continued to strengthen in the third series, and the show began to beat its competition in its timeslot. The final of the series where John Whaite was crowned the winner saw its highest rating yet, with an average of 6.5 million viewers that peaked at 7.2 million, which made it the second highest-rated BBC Two-originated show after Top Gear since at least 2006. The fourth series achieved some of the highest ratings seen on BBC Two. The viewer count for its premiere episode was more than two million higher than that of the previous series, while the final episode was seen by 9.1 million viewers at its peak, more than twice the number of viewers on BBC One and ITV. The final episode is the most-watched show on BBC Two since the present ratings system was introduced in 2002, beating the previous record set by Top Gear. As a result of its high ratings, the show was moved to BBC One.

After its move to BBC One, the opening episode was watched by over 7 million viewers according to overnight figures, beating the figure of 5.6 million for the opening episode of the previous year. The Bingate controversy surrounding episode four helped the show gain its biggest ever audience of 10.3 million viewers, with 2 million people who watched it on BBC iPlayer. The final of the show gained an overnight viewing figure of 12.29 million, then the highest viewing figure of the year for a non-sporting event on British TV. In the following year, the top ten ratings for 2015 was also dominated by The Great British Bake Off, with seven of the year's ten most-watched television programmes being episodes of the show, topped by the final episode with 15.05 million viewers. In the last series on the BBC in 2016, nine of the top ten most-watched programmes of the year were episodes of the show, with 16.03 million viewers watching the finale.

The first series broadcast by Channel 4 opened with average viewing figures of 5.8 million, rising to 6.5 million to include those watching on Channel 4+1, and 9.46 million for the 7-day rating. Although the overnight figure was the lowest for an opening episode since 2013, it was Channel 4's biggest audience since the Opening Ceremony of the 2012 Paralympics. This series attracted an average audience of 9 million viewers on Channel 4.

The eleventh series in 2020 received the highest audience for a TV series ever seen on Channel 4 in 35 years, after the miniseries A Woman of Substance which was watched by 13.9 million viewers in 1985. Its opening and final episodes were watched by 11.2 and 11.5 million viewers respectively, with a consolidated audience figure averaging at 10.6 million for the series. The series, which was available on Netflix in the US, was also the fifth most-streamed show among American audience in October 2020 according to Nielsen.

== Controversies ==
=== Product placement sanction ===
In September 2012, production company Love Productions was sanctioned by the BBC for product placement of Smeg fridges. The issue came to light after a viewer wrote to the Radio Times complaining of "blatant product promotion". After an investigation, the BBC said Love Productions' loan agreement with Smeg did not meet editorial guidelines and was being revised for the third series, and that appropriate retrospective hire payments would be made. The BBC asked Smeg to remove a notice from its website promoting its association with the show, which it did.

=== Favouritism ===
During the fourth series, allegations arose regarding Paul Hollywood's favouritism toward Ruby Tandoh, resulting in personal attacks against Tandoh including by the chef Raymond Blanc who derided her for being thin and at times crying, which he called "female tears". Tandoh subsequently defended herself with an article in The Guardian and reflected on the anger and misogyny in online commentary about the show. Both Hollywood and Tandoh denied the accusation.

Late in the ninth series, allegations of judges' favouritism toward Rahul Mandal arose among a small group of fans loyal to Kim-Joy, after judges gave Mandal compensatory time to complete his task. A shattered glass jug forced Mandal to stop and rendered his bake in progress unsafe. The producers awarded Mandal the time (15 minutes) he lost while his station was cleaned, after which he started his bake again from the beginning.

=== Baked Alaska controversy ("The Bincident") ===
In the fourth episode of the fifth series, there was controversy around the elimination of contestant Iain Watters. During the final showstopper round contestants were tasked with producing a Baked Alaska, Iain's ice cream was shown as having not set, and in a show of frustration, threw his bake in the bin. The editing of the show suggested that another contestant, Diana Beard, had caused the failure by removing the ice cream from a freezer, and the perceived "sabotage" resulted in an uproar on social media networks. However, unseen footage broadcast in the accompanying programme An Extra Slice shows Luis holding the large floor freezer that contained Iain's ice cream open as he piped the sides of his own baked Alaska, while Mel warns him to pipe quickly and close the freezer. Later in the episode, when Iain removes his ice cream to begin the next step of his dish, it is still quite soft, indicating it went into the freezer he shared with Diana without being completely frozen. Various members of the cast posted comments in support of Diana and a BBC spokesman later issued a statement that "Diana removing Iain's ice cream from the freezer for less than a minute was in no way responsible for Iain's departure."

More than 800 complaints were lodged with the BBC over the incident and some also complained to the communication watchdog Ofcom.

=== Use of innuendo ===
A number of viewers complained to the BBC feedback show Points of View in the fifth series about the "constant smutty remarks" from the presenters Mel and Sue. This series was seen as having more innuendos than previous ones; some reviewers noted the "extra pinch of saucy spice" and "the increasingly filthy-minded hosts Mel Giedroyc and Sue Perkins". However, the series 3 winner John Whaite argued that innuendo is part of what made the show a success, whilst judge Paul Hollywood described the innuendos as banter in the spirit of the Carry On films and a part of British culture, a view shared by others.

=== Spin-offs, legal challenges and move to Channel 4 ===
The success of The Great British Bake Off led to the BBC commissioning many other series closely following the format from Love Productions for example The Great British Sewing Bee and The Great Pottery Throw Down. However, when the 2014 series Hair using the same format was produced in house by the BBC, Love Productions responded by making preparations to sue the BBC for infringing their copyright. Although the matter was kept quiet, with the BBC settling out of court and compensating Love Productions, the matter soured relations between the BBC and Love Productions. In September 2016, it was announced that the BBC had lost the broadcast rights of the show to Channel 4. Channel 4 offered £25 million for the show outbidding the £15 million offered by the BBC. In January 2017 the BBC waived its rights to keep the programme off the air until 2018, and wished it "well for the future".

=== Accidental revelation of Series 8 winner ===
On 31 October 2017, judge Prue Leith accidentally revealed that Sophie Faldo was the winner of Series 8 on her Twitter account, twelve hours before the finale was due to air. This caused uproar among many fans of the show. She quickly deleted the tweet and apologised to the fans who saw it. The first episode of Series 9 poked fun at the incident by having hosts Toksvig and Fielding dress as Marty McFly and Doc Brown from Back to the Future and travel back in time via a DeLorean time machine to stop Leith from tweeting out the season's winner.

In the Bake Off 2023 Festive Special, this controversy was referenced by Prue Leith where she jokes "this time I won't Tweet it" while speaking to Sophie Faldo.

=== Nationally-themed weeks ===
Recent series have included weeks themed around a designated country, many of which have been criticised for their use of inauthentic dishes, fostering of stereotypes and "casual" racism.

In series 11, "Japan Week" was widely and heavily criticised for not having any actual Japanese pastries. One of the participants opted to make an Indian-inspired bun with a dahl filling, while another chose a Chinese stir-fry filling, neither of which would be found in traditional Japanese baking. Viewers of the show were particularly offended with contestant Hermine styling her steamed buns to look like panda bears, a species that is native to China and not Japan, and another baker's looked like an American-style cheeseburger and fries. Most contestants chose to do Chinese or Indian flavours, resulting in the show being called out for assuming "all Asians are Japanese."

After the airing of the "German Week" episode in series 12, Noel Fielding and Matt Lucas were criticised on social media for mocking a German accent during the show. It was widely described as "irritating and inappropriate," raised the question over whether this would be allowed if it were another nationality. Lucas in particular was criticised by many viewers for his "casual racism." In the same episode, Paul Hollywood apologised to German contestant Jürgen because the week's showstopper challenge was not something German: participants were given the task of making a three-tier cake with yeast. Jürgen was reportedly "baffled" by this challenge, and said that it was not something that he would normally see at home. Hollywood joked that he had "anglicised" the challenge.

During series 13, the episode broadcast on 4 October 2022, was "Mexican week." Like many previous weeks celebrating foreign cuisine, the show was branded with allegations of cultural appropriation. Additionally, criticism was directed at the incorrect pronunciation, inaccurate labelling of Mexican dishes, and a sketch where Matt and Noel dressed in sombreros and ponchos, which was deemed disrespectful. The New York Times restaurant critic Tejal Rao called the episode "casually racist."

In September 2023, prior to series 14, the show's producers announced the series would no longer include nationally-themed weeks, replacing them with a new party-cake week.

=== Allusions to calories ===
Since her appointment as a Bake-Off judge, Prue Leith has been criticised by groups such as the eating disorders charity Beat for describing some bakes as "not worth the calories". Beat noted that referring to the calorific content of foods can be potentially harmful or distressing to people suffering from (or vulnerable to) eating disorders, with the charity's director of external affairs Tom Quinn describing the expression as "very unhelpful". In response, Leith recognised that the phrase was potentially problematic, and said that she might not use it in future.

== Awards and nominations ==
The Great British Bake Off has been nominated a number of times in various categories for the BAFTA awards and won in 2012, 2013, and 2016. The programme was nominated for a Rose d'Or in the Lifestyle section of the 2012 competition and won. It also won two 2015 National Television Award for Skills Challenge Show.

Year	Award	Category	Recipient	Results	Ref.
2012	Rose d'Or	Lifestyle	The Great British Bake Off	Won	
2012	BAFTA TV Awards	Features	Anna Beattie, Andy Devonshire, Simon Evans, Richard McKerrow	Won	
2012	BAFTA TV Awards	YouTube Audience Award	The Great British Bake Off	Nominated	
2013	BAFTA TV Awards	Features	Anna Beattie, Kieran Smith, Amanda Westwood, Scott Tankard	Won	
2013	BAFTA TV Awards	Radio Times Audience Award	The Great British Bake Off	Nominated	
2013	National Television Award	Factual Entertainment	The Great British Bake Off	Nominated	
2014	BAFTA TV Awards	Features	Anna Beattie, Amanda Westwood, Samantha Beddoes, Simon Evans	Nominated	
2014	National Television Award	Factual Entertainment	The Great British Bake Off	Nominated	
2015	BAFTA TV Awards	Features	Anna Beattie, Samantha Beddoes, Andy Devonshire, Simon Evans	Nominated	
2015	BAFTA TV Awards	Radio Times Audience Award	The Great British Bake Off	Nominated	
2015	National Television Award	Skills Challenge Show	The Great British Bake Off	Won	
2016	National Television Award	Challenge Show	The Great British Bake Off	Won	
2016	BAFTA TV Awards	Features	The Great British Bake Off production team	Won	
2016	BAFTA TV Awards	Radio Times audience award	The Great British Bake Off	Nominated	
2016	Asian Viewers Television Awards	Best Of British	The Great British Bake Off	Nominated	
2017	National Television Award	Challenge Show	The Great British Bake Off	Nominated	
2017	National Television Award	TV judge	Mary Berry	Won	
2017	BAFTA TV Awards	Features	The Great British Bake Off production team	Nominated	
2017	Asian Viewers Television Awards	Best Of British	The Great British Bake Off	Nominated	
2018	TRIC Awards	Food Programme	The Great British Bake Off	Won	
2019	National Television Award	Factual Entertainment	The Great British Bake Off	Nominated	
2019	BAFTA TV Awards	Features	The Great British Bake Off	Nominated	
2019	TRIC Awards	Food Programme	The Great British Bake Off	Won	
2020	National Television Award	Challenge Show	The Great British Bake Off	Won	
2021	Critics' Choice Real TV Awards	Best Competition Series	The Great British Bake Off	Won	
2021	National Television Award	Challenge Show	The Great British Bake Off	Won	
2023	TRIC Awards	Food Programme	The Great British Bake Off	Won	
2025	TRIC Awards	Food Programme	The Great British Bake Off	Won	

== International broadcasts and versions ==
The British version of The Great British Bake Off is broadcast in many countries and it has been sold to 196 territories as of 2015. The format has also been sold to 20 territories by 2015, making it the third most successful BBC format after Strictly Come Dancing and The Weakest Link. Many of these shows have been successful. The Junior Bake Off format has also been sold to Thailand.

=== Broadcasts ===
==== Canada ====
CBC Television began broadcasting The Great British Bake Off in Canada in August 2016, starting with the sixth series under the title The Great British Baking Show. Subsequent seasons have aired the summer following their British airings, with Series 9 debuting in July 2019.

The CBC also produces a Canadian version called The Great Canadian Baking Show with an identical format.

==== United States ====
The Great British Bake Off airs in the United States under the name The Great British Baking Show because "Bake-Off" is a registered trademark of Pillsbury in the U.S. As of October 2022, the British series 1–7 were available in the United States on The Roku Channel, labeled as Seasons 1–7, and the British series 8–13 were available in the United States on Netflix, labeled as Collections 5–10.

From 2014 to 2018, the US broadcaster PBS aired five series of the show. PBS broadcast the fifth British series as Season 1 in winter 2014–2015, shortly after it aired in the UK, and in autumn 2015 PBS broadcast the fourth British series as Season 2 because the new British series was not ready. The sixth series was broadcast as Season 3 in summer 2016, and the seventh series was broadcast as Season 4 in summer 2017. After the show moved to Channel 4, PBS purchased the BBC's third series and broadcast it as Season 5 instead of licensing the eighth series from Channel 4. PBS chose not to license the Channel 4 series.

In 2018, Netflix acquired the rights to stream the eighth British series, which was the first from Channel 4, and debuted it as a "Netflix Original Production" labeled as Collection 5; the service already had PBS's Seasons 1–4 available for streaming, labeled as Collections 1–4. Netflix added the third British series as a separate show, The Great British Baking Show: The Beginnings, later in 2018. In January 2022, Collections 1–4 and The Great British Baking Show: The Beginnings left Netflix. Netflix also added the Holiday and Masterclass episodes as separate shows from the individual seasons they were originally part of. The Great British Baking Show: Holidays includes the holiday episodes that have aired since 2018. The Masterclass episodes were added to Netflix in April 2017 as The Great British Baking Show: Masterclass, but were removed in April 2021.

In 2022, The Roku Channel began streaming the seven British series that originally aired on the BBC, including the first and second series that had not previously been available in the U.S.

The following table shows the analogous series numbers between the major distributors; the series in italics are no longer available from that distributor:

Original UK series number	The Roku Channel	Netflix	PBS
Series 1 (2010)	Season 1	–	–
Series 2 (2011)	Season 2	–	–
Series 3 (2012)	Season 3	The Beginnings	Season 5
Series 4 (2013)	Season 4	Collection 2	Season 2
Series 5 (2014)	Season 5	Collection 1	Season 1
Series 6 (2015)	Season 6	Collection 3	Season 3
Series 7 (2016)	Season 7	Collection 4	Season 4
Series 8 (2017)	–	Collection 5	–
Series 9 (2018)	–	Collection 6	–
Series 10 (2019)	–	Collection 7	–
Series 11 (2020)	–	Collection 8	–
Series 12 (2021)	–	Collection 9	–
Series 13 (2022)	–	Collection 10	–
Series 14 (2023)	–	Collection 11	–

=== International versions ===
==== Current ====
Airing or in production Upcoming season

Country	Local title	Host(s)	Judges	Channel	Premiere
Middle East and North Africa	Arab Bake off	Juliana Saada	Pierre Kurdi; Michel Selim; Jamal Al-Ali	Al-Dar 4	11 February 2022
Algeria	Le Meilleur Pâtissier الجزائري (The Algerian Best Pastry Chef)	Mehdi Yades	Mehdi Hadj Mebarek; Lella Louza	Echourouk TV	28 January 2023
Argentina	Bake Off Argentina, El Gran Pastelero (Bake Off Argentina, The Great Baker)	Paula Chaves	Damián Betular (seasons 1-3); Pamela Villar (seasons 1-3); Dolli Irigoyen (season 3); Christophe Krywonis (seasons 1-2)	Telefe	8 April 2018
Argentina	Bake Off Famosos Argentina (Celebrity Bake Off Argentina)	Wanda Nara	Damián Betular; Maru Botana; Christophe Krywonis	Telefe	2024
Australia	The Great Australian Bake Off	Shane Jacobson (2013); Anna Gare (2013); Claire Hooper (2015–2022); Mel Buttle (2015–2022); Natalie Tran (2023–); Cal Wilson (2023–2024); Tom Walker (2025–)	Dan Lepard (2013); Kerry Vincent (2013); Maggie Beer (2015–2022); Matt Moran (2015–2022); Darren Purchese (2023–); Rachel Khoo (2023–)	Nine Network (2013); LifeStyle Food (2015–2016); Lifestyle (2018–)	9 July 2013
Belgium (Flanders)	De MeesterBakker (The Master Baker)	Rani De Coninck	Sofie Dumont; Bernard Proot	vtm	4 April 2012
Belgium (Flanders)	Bake Off Vlaanderen (Bake Off Flanders)	Wim Opbrouck	Regula Ysewijn; Herman Van Dender	VIER	30 August 2017
Brazil	Bake Off Brasil	Ticiana Villas Boas (2015–16, 2020); Carol Fiorentino (2017); Chris Flores (2020); Nadja Haddad (2018–23, 2025); Fabiana Karla (2024)	Carol Fiorentino (2015–16); Fabrizio Fasano Jr. (2015–17); Olivier Anquier (2018–21); Carlos Bertolazzi (2023); Giuseppe Gerundino (2022–23, 2025); Beca Milano (2017–23, 2025); Carole Crema (2024); André Mifano (2024)	SBT; Discovery Home & Health	25 July 2015
Brazil	Bake Off SBT	Ticiana Villas Boas (2015–16, 2020); Carol Fiorentino (2017); Chris Flores (2020); Nadja Haddad (2018–23, 2025); Fabiana Karla (2024)	Carol Fiorentino (2015–16); Fabrizio Fasano Jr. (2015–17); Olivier Anquier (2018–21); Carlos Bertolazzi (2023); Giuseppe Gerundino (2022–23, 2025); Beca Milano (2017–23, 2025); Carole Crema (2024); André Mifano (2024)	SBT; Discovery Home & Health	23 December 2017
Brazil	Júnior Bake Off Brasil	Ticiana Villas Boas (2015–16, 2020); Carol Fiorentino (2017); Chris Flores (2020); Nadja Haddad (2018–23, 2025); Fabiana Karla (2024)	Carol Fiorentino (2015–16); Fabrizio Fasano Jr. (2015–17); Olivier Anquier (2018–21); Carlos Bertolazzi (2023); Giuseppe Gerundino (2022–23, 2025); Beca Milano (2017–23, 2025); Carole Crema (2024); André Mifano (2024)	SBT; Discovery Home & Health	6 January 2018
Brazil	Bake Off Celebridades	Ticiana Villas Boas (2015–16, 2020); Carol Fiorentino (2017); Chris Flores (2020); Nadja Haddad (2018–23, 2025); Fabiana Karla (2024)	Carol Fiorentino (2015–16); Fabrizio Fasano Jr. (2015–17); Olivier Anquier (2018–21); Carlos Bertolazzi (2023); Giuseppe Gerundino (2022–23, 2025); Beca Milano (2017–23, 2025); Carole Crema (2024); André Mifano (2024)	SBT; Discovery Home & Health	20 February 2021
Canada	The Great Canadian Baking Show	Dan Levy (seasons 1–2); Julia Chan (seasons 1–2); Aurora Browne (season 3); Carolyn Taylor (season 3); Ann Pornel (from season 4); Alan Shane Lewis (from season 4)	Bruno Feldeisen (from season 1); Rochelle Adonis (seasons 1–2); Kyla Kennaley (from season 3)	CBC	1 November 2017
Canada (Quebec)	Le meilleur pâtissier du Québec	Marie-Ève Janvier; Joël Legendre	Joël Lahon; Gaël Vidricaire	Vrai	17 January 2022
Chile	Bake Off Chile, El Gran Pastelero (Bake Off Chile, The Great Baker)	Carolina de Moras	Yann Yvin; Gustavo Sáez; Millaray Vallejos	Chilevisión	6 August 2018
Czech Republic	Peče celá země (Whole country bakes)	Tereza Bebarová; Václav Kopta	(Mirka van Gils Slavíková); Michaela Landová; Josef Maršálek	ČT1	4 January 2020
Denmark	Den store bagedyst (The Great Baking Bout)	Neel Rønholt (season 1); Peter Ingemann (season 1–2); Timm Vladimir (from season 3)	Mette Blomsterberg (season 1–6); Jan Friis-Mikkelsen (season 1–6); Katrine Foged Thomsen (fromseason 7); Marcus Grigo (from season 7)	DR1	28 August 2012
Estonia	Eesti parim pagar	Kristjan Rabi (2015); Indrek Vaheoja (2015); Alari Kivisaar	Angeelika Kang; Ants Uustalu	TV3	31 August 2015
Finland	Koko Suomi leipoo (All of Finland bakes)	Anne Kukkohovi	Mika Parviainen; Sami Granroth	MTV3	24 September 2013
France	Le Meilleur Pâtissier (The Best Pastry Chef)	Faustine Bollaert (2012–2017); Julia Vignali (2017–21); Marie Portolano (2021–2023); Laëtitia Milot (from 2024)	Cyril Lignac; Jacqueline Mercorelli	M6; RTL-TVI (Belgium)	26 November 2012
Germany	Das große Backen (The great Bake)	Britt Hagedorn (2013); Meltem Kaptan (2013); Enie van de Meiklokjes (2014–16, from 2018); Annika Lau (2017)	Christian Hümbs; Enie van de Meiklokjes (2013); Andrea Schirmaier-Huber (2013–14); Betty Schliephake-Burchardt (from 2015)	Sat.1	1 December 2013
Hungary	Ide süss! (Az ország nagy cukrászversenye)	Hajós András; Sass Dániel	Baracskay Angéla; Szabadfi Szabolcs	Viasat 3	26 March 2018
Italy	Bake Off Italia - Dolci in forno (Bake Off Italy – Sweets in the oven)	Benedetta Parodi (2013-2024) Brenda Lodigiani (2025-present)	Ernst Knam (2013-present); Clelia d'Onofrio (2013-2021); Damiano Carrara (2017-present) Tommaso Foglia (2022-present)	Real Time	November 2013
Kenya	The Great Kenyan Bake Off	June Gachui; Nick Ndeda	Kiran Jethwa; Myra Kivuvani Ndungu	KTN Home	7 October 2019
Japan	ベイクオフ・ジャパン (Bake Off Japan)	Maki Sakai; Asuka Kudo	Toshihiko Yoroizuka; Yoshimi Ishikawa	Amazon Prime Video	22 April 2022
Morocco	Pâtissier أحسن (The Best Pastry Chef)	Fadwa Hirate	Othmane Belefkih; Bouchra Tamimi	2M	26 January 2021
Netherlands	Heel Holland Bakt (All of Holland bakes)	Martine Bijl (2013–2015); André van Duin (2016–present)	Robèrt van Beckhoven; Janny van der Heijden	MAX (NPO 1)	5 June 2013
New Zealand	The Great Kiwi Bake Off	Madeleine Sami; Hayley Sproull	Dean Brettschneider; Sue Fleischl	TVNZ 2 (2018–2019); TVNZ 1 (2021)	16 October 2018
Norway	Hele Norge baker (All of Norway Bakes)	Line Verndal	Pascal Dupuy; Øyvind Lofthus	TV3	10 March 2013
Slovakia	Pečie celé Slovensko (All of Slovakia Bakes)	Juraj Bača; Milan "Junior" Zimnýkoval	Petra Tóthová; Jozefína Zaukolcová	RTVS	10 October 2021
South Africa	The Great South African Bake Off	Anne Hirsch; Donovan Goliath (series 1); Lentswe Bhengu (series 2–3); Lesego Tlhabi (series 4); Glen Biderman-Pam (series 4)	Shirley Guy; Tjaart Walraven; Siba Mtongana (series 4); Paul Hartmann (series 4)	BBC Lifestyle	9 August 2023
Spain	Bake Off: Famosos al horno (Bake Off: Celebrities to the oven)	Paula Vázquez	Paco Roncero; Eva Arguiñano; Damián Betular	La 1	11 January 2024
Sweden	Hela Sverige bakar (All of Sweden Bakes)	Tilde de Paula	Johan Sörberg; Birgitta Rasmussen	TV4 (Sjuan)	20 September 2012
Sweden	Hela kändis-Sverige bakar (Celebrity All of Sweden Bakes)	Tilde de Paula	Johan Sörberg; Birgitta Rasmussen	TV4 (Sjuan)	11 November 2014
Thailand	The Great Thai Bake Off (ยอดนักอบขนม)	TBA	TBA	PPTV HD 36	June 2019
Uruguay	Bake Off Uruguay	Jimena Sabaris (2022–present); Annasofía Facello (2021)	Sofía Muñoz (2021–present); Hugo Soca (2022–present); Rose Galfione (2022–present); Stephanie Rauhut (2021); Jean Paul Bondoux (2021)	Canal 4	26 August 2021
Uruguay	Bake Off Famosos Uruguay (Celebrity Bake Off Uruguay)	Jimena Sabaris	Hugo Soca; Leticia Copiz	Canal 4	3 September 2025

==== Former ====
No longer airing

Country	Local title	Host(s)	Judges	Channel	Premiere
Bulgaria	Bake Off: Най-сладкото състезание (Bake Off: The Sweetest Competition)	Aleksandra Raeva; Raffi Bohosyan	Julia Pandzherova; Yuri Baltaliyski	Nova TV	15 November 2016
Greece	Bake Off Greece	Ioanna Triantafyllidou	Nikolas Straggas; Akis Petretzikis; Dimitris Xronopoulos	Alpha TV	23 September 2018
Ireland	The Great Irish Bake Off	Anna Nolan	Biddy White Lennon; Paul Kelly	TV3	19 September 2013
Poland	Polski turniej wypieków [Polish baking contest]	Piotr Gąsowski (1–2); Marta Grycan (1); Katarzyna Skrzynecka (2)	Bożena Sikoń (1–2); Tomasz Deker (1–2)	TLC [Polish]	10 October 2012
Poland	Bake Off – Ale ciacho! [Bake Off – what a cupcake!]	Paulina Mikuła (1); Anna Gacek (1); Marcelina Zawadzka (2–5); Dorota Czaja (2); Katarzyna Kołeczek (3–4); Ida Nowakowska (5)	Krzysztof Ilnicki (1–5); Małgorzata Molska (1–2); Michał Bryś (3–5)	TVP2	5 September 2016
Poland	Bake Off Junior [Junior Bake Off]	Marcelina Zawadzka (1); Ida Nowakowska (1)	Krzysztof Ilnicki (1); Michał Bryś (1)	TVP2	6 September 2018
Romania	Bake Off România(Bake Off Romania)	Nicolle Stanese	Tudor Constantinescu; Simona Pope; Alex Stan	Pro TV	29 February 2016 (1 season)
Spain	Bake Off España (Bake Off Spain)	Jesús Vázquez	Dani Álvarez; Betina Montagne; Miquel Guarro	Cuatro	6 March 2019
Spain	Celebrity Bake Off España (Celebrity Bake Off Spain)	Paula Vázquez; Brays Efe	Clara Villalón; Frédéric Bau	Amazon Prime Video	16 December 2021
Turkey	Ver Fırına	Burcu Esmersoy	Arda Türkmen; Emel Başdoğan	TV8	20 October 2014
Ukraine	Великий Пекарський Турнір (Velykyy Pekarsʹkyy Turnir; Great Bakers Tournament)	Yuri Nikolaevich Gorbunov	Serge Markovic; Catherine Ahronik; Olga Ganushchak	1+1	1 September 2013
United States	The American Baking Competition	Jeff Foxworthy	Marcela Valladolid; Paul Hollywood	CBS	29 May 2013
United States	The Great American Baking Show	Nia Vardalos (seasons 1–2); Ian Gomez (seasons 1–2); Ayesha Curry (season 3); Anthony Adams (seasons 3–4); Emma Bunton (season 4)	Johnny Iuzzini (seasons 1–3); Mary Berry (seasons 1–2); Paul Hollywood (season 3–4); Sherry Yard (season 4)	ABC	30 November 2015 (as The Great Holiday Baking Show)

== The Great Sport Relief Bake Off ==
The Great Sport Relief Bake Off
- Genre: Cooking; Baking
- Presented by: Mel Giedroyc; Jennifer Saunders; Ed Byrne; Sarah Millican; Sue Perkins; Jo Brand; Omid Djalili
- Judges: Mary Berry; Paul Hollywood
- Country of origin: United Kingdom
- Original language: English
- No. of series: 3
- No. of episodes: 12

Production
- Running time: 60 minutes
- Production company: Love Productions

Original release
- Network: BBC Two (2012–2013); BBC One (2014–2016)
- Release: 10 January 2012 – 23 February 2016

Episode viewing figures from BARB.

=== Series 1 (2012) ===
Finalist Winner

No.	Signature Challenge	Technical Challenge	Showstopper Challenge	Contestants	Airdate	Viewers (millions)
1	Traybake	Wholemeal Cheese Scones	Meringue Dessert	Angela Griffin	10 January 2012	3.52
1	Traybake	Wholemeal Cheese Scones	Meringue Dessert	James Wong	10 January 2012	3.52
1	Traybake	Wholemeal Cheese Scones	Meringue Dessert	Joe Swift	10 January 2012	3.52
1	Traybake	Wholemeal Cheese Scones	Meringue Dessert	Sarah Hadland	10 January 2012	3.52
2	Savoury Flan	Banana & Chocolate Chip Loaves	Layered Cake	Arlene Phillips	11 January 2012	2.79
2	Savoury Flan	Banana & Chocolate Chip Loaves	Layered Cake	Fi Glover	11 January 2012	2.79
2	Savoury Flan	Banana & Chocolate Chip Loaves	Layered Cake	Gus Casely-Hayford	11 January 2012	2.79
2	Savoury Flan	Banana & Chocolate Chip Loaves	Layered Cake	Saira Khan	11 January 2012	2.79
3	Classic Crumble	Coffee & Walnut Cake	24 Miniature Tarts	Alex Deakin	12 January 2012	2.56
3	Classic Crumble	Coffee & Walnut Cake	24 Miniature Tarts	Alex Langlands	12 January 2012	2.56
3	Classic Crumble	Coffee & Walnut Cake	24 Miniature Tarts	Anita Rani	12 January 2012	2.56
3	Classic Crumble	Coffee & Walnut Cake	24 Miniature Tarts	Pearl Lowe	12 January 2012	2.56
4	Trio of Baked Biscuits	6 Sausage Rolls	Covered Tiered Occasion Cake	Angela Griffin	13 January 2012	3.43
4	Trio of Baked Biscuits	6 Sausage Rolls	Covered Tiered Occasion Cake	Anita Rani	13 January 2012	3.43
4	Trio of Baked Biscuits	6 Sausage Rolls	Covered Tiered Occasion Cake	Fi Glover	13 January 2012	3.43

=== Series 2 (2014) ===
Star Baker

No.	Guest host	Signature Challenge	Technical Challenge	Showstopper Challenge	Contestants	Airdate	Viewers (millions)
1	Sue Perkins	12 Sandwich Biscuits	Tarte Tatin	3D Novelty Cake	Bonnie Wright	13 January 2014	4.37
1	Sue Perkins	12 Sandwich Biscuits	Tarte Tatin	3D Novelty Cake	Johnny Vaughan	13 January 2014	4.37
1	Sue Perkins	12 Sandwich Biscuits	Tarte Tatin	3D Novelty Cake	Michael Vaughan	13 January 2014	4.37
1	Sue Perkins	12 Sandwich Biscuits	Tarte Tatin	3D Novelty Cake	Samantha Bond	13 January 2014	4.37
2	Jo Brand	12 Gingerbread Biscuits	Banoffee Pie	Chocolate Cake	Greg Rutherford	14 January 2014	5.07
2	Jo Brand	12 Gingerbread Biscuits	Banoffee Pie	Chocolate Cake	Jane Horrocks	14 January 2014	5.07
2	Jo Brand	12 Gingerbread Biscuits	Banoffee Pie	Chocolate Cake	Jason Gardiner	14 January 2014	5.07
2	Jo Brand	12 Gingerbread Biscuits	Banoffee Pie	Chocolate Cake	Kirsty Young	14 January 2014	5.07
3	Omid Djalili	Traybake	Iced Ring Doughnuts	Layered Cakes	Emma Freud	15 January 2014	5.02
3	Omid Djalili	Traybake	Iced Ring Doughnuts	Layered Cakes	Jamelia	15 January 2014	5.02
3	Omid Djalili	Traybake	Iced Ring Doughnuts	Layered Cakes	Michael Ball	15 January 2014	5.02
3	Omid Djalili	Traybake	Iced Ring Doughnuts	Layered Cakes	Victoria Pendleton	15 January 2014	5.02
4	Ed Byrne	Pizzas	Eccles Cakes	Tiered Cakes	Alistair McGowan	16 January 2014	4.94
4	Ed Byrne	Pizzas	Eccles Cakes	Tiered Cakes	Doon Mackichan	16 January 2014	4.94
4	Ed Byrne	Pizzas	Eccles Cakes	Tiered Cakes	Helen Skelton	16 January 2014	4.94
4	Ed Byrne	Pizzas	Eccles Cakes	Tiered Cakes	Rochelle Humes	16 January 2014	4.94

=== Series 3 (2016) ===
Star Baker

No.	Guest host	Signature Challenge	Technical Challenge	Showstopper Challenge	Contestants	Airdate	Viewers (millions)
1	Mel Giedroyc	Canapés	Paris–Brest	Trophy Cake	David James	27 January 2016	6.03
1	Mel Giedroyc	Canapés	Paris–Brest	Trophy Cake	Jason Manford	27 January 2016	6.03
1	Mel Giedroyc	Canapés	Paris–Brest	Trophy Cake	Maddy Hill	27 January 2016	6.03
1	Mel Giedroyc	Canapés	Paris–Brest	Trophy Cake	Samantha Cameron	27 January 2016	6.03
2	Jennifer Saunders	American Muffins	Football Pie	Tiered Cake	Chris Kamara	3 February 2016	7.44
2	Jennifer Saunders	American Muffins	Football Pie	Tiered Cake	Ed Balls	3 February 2016	7.44
2	Jennifer Saunders	American Muffins	Football Pie	Tiered Cake	Kimberley Walsh	3 February 2016	7.44
2	Jennifer Saunders	American Muffins	Football Pie	Tiered Cake	Victoria Coren Mitchell	3 February 2016	7.44
3	Ed Byrne	Savoury tarts	Chocolate and Beetroot Tray Bake	3D Biscuits	Geri Horner	17 February 2016	7.12
3	Ed Byrne	Savoury tarts	Chocolate and Beetroot Tray Bake	3D Biscuits	Jermaine Jenas	17 February 2016	7.12
3	Ed Byrne	Savoury tarts	Chocolate and Beetroot Tray Bake	3D Biscuits	John Simpson	17 February 2016	7.12
3	Ed Byrne	Savoury tarts	Chocolate and Beetroot Tray Bake	3D Biscuits	Louise Redknapp	17 February 2016	7.12
4	Sarah Millican	Open-top Pie	Salmon Roulade	Cupcakes	Ade Edmondson	24 February 2016	6.74
4	Sarah Millican	Open-top Pie	Salmon Roulade	Cupcakes	Alison Steadman	24 February 2016	6.74
4	Sarah Millican	Open-top Pie	Salmon Roulade	Cupcakes	Morgana Robinson	24 February 2016	6.74
4	Sarah Millican	Open-top Pie	Salmon Roulade	Cupcakes	Will Young	24 February 2016	6.74

== The Great Comic Relief Bake Off ==
The Great Comic Relief Bake Off
- Genre: Cooking; Baking
- Presented by: Mel Giedroyc; Sue Perkins; Jo Brand; Ed Byrne
- Judges: Mary Berry; Paul Hollywood
- Country of origin: United Kingdom
- Original language: English
- No. of series: 2
- No. of episodes: 8

Production
- Running time: 60 minutes
- Production company: Love Productions

Original release
- Network: BBC Two (2013); BBC One (2015)
- Release: 21 January 2013 – 4 March 2015

=== Series 1 (2013) ===
Star Baker

No.	Signature Challenge	Technical Challenge	Showstopper Challenge	Contestants	Airdate	Viewers (millions)
1	Shortbread	Custard Slices	Portrait Cake	Jo Brand	21 January 2013	4.17
1	Shortbread	Custard Slices	Portrait Cake	Stephen K. Amos	21 January 2013	4.17
1	Shortbread	Custard Slices	Portrait Cake	Lorna Watson	21 January 2013	4.17
1	Shortbread	Custard Slices	Portrait Cake	Ingrid Oliver	21 January 2013	4.17
2	Iced Biscuits	Bakewell Tart	Gateaux	Warwick Davis	22 January 2013	4.44
2	Iced Biscuits	Bakewell Tart	Gateaux	Duncan Bannatyne	22 January 2013	4.44
2	Iced Biscuits	Bakewell Tart	Gateaux	Simon Reeve	22 January 2013	4.44
2	Iced Biscuits	Bakewell Tart	Gateaux	Andy Akinwolere	22 January 2013	4.44
3	Scones	Chocolate Éclairs	Novelty Cake	Ellie Simmonds	23 January 2013	4.34
3	Scones	Chocolate Éclairs	Novelty Cake	Kirsty Wark	23 January 2013	4.34
3	Scones	Chocolate Éclairs	Novelty Cake	Julia Bradbury	23 January 2013	4.34
3	Scones	Chocolate Éclairs	Novelty Cake	Bob Mortimer	23 January 2013	4.34
4	Chocolate Biscuits	Lemon Meringue Pie	Comic Relief Birthday Cake	Claudia Winkleman	24 January 2013	4.39
4	Chocolate Biscuits	Lemon Meringue Pie	Comic Relief Birthday Cake	Ed Byrne	24 January 2013	4.39
4	Chocolate Biscuits	Lemon Meringue Pie	Comic Relief Birthday Cake	Martha Kearney	24 January 2013	4.39
4	Chocolate Biscuits	Lemon Meringue Pie	Comic Relief Birthday Cake	Helen Glover	24 January 2013	4.39

=== Series 2 (2015) ===
Star Baker

No.	Guest host	Signature Challenge	Technical Challenge	Showstopper Challenge	Contestants	Airdate	Viewers (millions)
1	Sue Perkins	Giant Cookie or Biscuit	12 Mini Fruit Tarts	Tiered Chocolate Cake	Dame Edna Everage	11 February 2015	7.75
1	Sue Perkins	Giant Cookie or Biscuit	12 Mini Fruit Tarts	Tiered Chocolate Cake	Joanna Lumley	11 February 2015	7.75
1	Sue Perkins	Giant Cookie or Biscuit	12 Mini Fruit Tarts	Tiered Chocolate Cake	Jennifer Saunders	11 February 2015	7.75
1	Sue Perkins	Giant Cookie or Biscuit	12 Mini Fruit Tarts	Tiered Chocolate Cake	Lulu	11 February 2015	7.75
2	Mel Giedroyc	24 cupcakes	20 profiteroles	Marble "Building" Cake	Jonathan Ross	18 February 2015	8.39
2	Mel Giedroyc	24 cupcakes	20 profiteroles	Marble "Building" Cake	Zoe Sugg	18 February 2015	8.39
2	Mel Giedroyc	24 cupcakes	20 profiteroles	Marble "Building" Cake	Gok Wan	18 February 2015	8.39
2	Mel Giedroyc	24 cupcakes	20 profiteroles	Marble "Building" Cake	Abbey Clancy	18 February 2015	8.39
3	Jo Brand	24 Shortbread	6 Mini Pork Pies	Triple-tiered Pavlova	Sarah Brown	25 February 2015	7.92
3	Jo Brand	24 Shortbread	6 Mini Pork Pies	Triple-tiered Pavlova	David Mitchell	25 February 2015	7.92
3	Jo Brand	24 Shortbread	6 Mini Pork Pies	Triple-tiered Pavlova	Michael Sheen	25 February 2015	7.92
3	Jo Brand	24 Shortbread	6 Mini Pork Pies	Triple-tiered Pavlova	Jameela Jamil	25 February 2015	7.92
4	Ed Byrne	Tray Bake	12 Crumpets	Vegetable Self Portrait Cake	Alexa Chung	4 March 2015	8.21
4	Ed Byrne	Tray Bake	12 Crumpets	Vegetable Self Portrait Cake	Victoria Wood	4 March 2015	8.21
4	Ed Byrne	Tray Bake	12 Crumpets	Vegetable Self Portrait Cake	Chris Moyles	4 March 2015	8.21
4	Ed Byrne	Tray Bake	12 Crumpets	Vegetable Self Portrait Cake	Kayvan Novak	4 March 2015	8.21

== The Great Stand Up to Cancer Bake Off ==
The Great Stand Up to Cancer Bake Off
- Also known as: The Great Celebrity Bake Off For Stand Up to Cancer
- Genre: Cooking; Baking
- Presented by: Noel Fielding; Alison Hammond
- Judges: Paul Hollywood; Cherish Finden; Caroline Waldegrave
- Country of origin: United Kingdom
- Original language: English
- No. of series: 9
- No. of episodes: 49

Production
- Production company: Love Productions

Original release
- Network: Channel 4
- Release: 6 March 2018 – present

=== Series overview ===
Series	Episodes	Premiere	Finale	Timeslot	Channel
1	5	6 March 2018	3 April 2018	Tuesday; 8:00 pm	Channel 4
2	5	5 March 2019	2 April 2019	Tuesday; 8:00 pm	Channel 4
3	5	10 March 2020	7 April 2020	Tuesday; 8:00 pm	Channel 4
4	5	9 March 2021	6 April 2021	Tuesday; 8:00 pm	Channel 4
5	5	22 March 2022	19 April 2022	Tuesday; 8:00 pm	Channel 4
6	5	19 March 2023	16 April 2023	Sunday; 7:40 pm	Channel 4
7	5	17 March 2024	14 April 2024	Sunday; 7:40 pm	Channel 4
8	5	16 March 2025	13 April 2025	Sunday; 7:40 pm	Channel 4
9	5	22 March 2026	12 April 2026	Sunday; 7:40 pm	Channel 4

=== Series 1 (2018) ===
Star Baker

No.	Signature Challenge	Technical Challenge	Showstopper Challenge	Contestants	Airdate	Viewers (millions)
1	12 cupcakes	6 Crêpes Suzette	3D biscuit scene	Roisin Conaty	6 March 2018	5.91
1	12 cupcakes	6 Crêpes Suzette	3D biscuit scene	Martin Kemp	6 March 2018	5.91
1	12 cupcakes	6 Crêpes Suzette	3D biscuit scene	Harry Hill	6 March 2018	5.91
1	12 cupcakes	6 Crêpes Suzette	3D biscuit scene	Bill Turnbull	6 March 2018	5.91
2	24 scones	Devil's food cake	Self-portrait croquembouches	Nick Hewer	13 March 2018	5.65
2	24 scones	Devil's food cake	Self-portrait croquembouches	Perri Kiely	13 March 2018	5.65
2	24 scones	Devil's food cake	Self-portrait croquembouches	Stacey Solomon	13 March 2018	5.65
2	24 scones	Devil's food cake	Self-portrait croquembouches	Ricky Wilson	13 March 2018	5.65
3	Loaf cake	8 Tiramisu sandwich biscuits	Meringue towers	Ella Eyre	20 March 2018	5.95
3	Loaf cake	8 Tiramisu sandwich biscuits	Meringue towers	Ruth Davidson	20 March 2018	5.95
3	Loaf cake	8 Tiramisu sandwich biscuits	Meringue towers	Jamie Laing	20 March 2018	5.95
3	Loaf cake	8 Tiramisu sandwich biscuits	Meringue towers	Tim Minchin	20 March 2018	5.95
4	12 blondies	6 fruit turnovers	Secret passion cake	Griff Rhys Jones	27 March 2018	5.48
4	12 blondies	6 fruit turnovers	Secret passion cake	Joe Lycett	27 March 2018	5.48
4	12 blondies	6 fruit turnovers	Secret passion cake	Lee Mack	27 March 2018	5.48
4	12 blondies	6 fruit turnovers	Secret passion cake	Melanie Sykes	27 March 2018	5.48
5	12 muffins	Custard pie	Rainbow dream cake	Aisling Bea	3 April 2018	5.53
5	12 muffins	Custard pie	Rainbow dream cake	Alan Carr	3 April 2018	5.53
5	12 muffins	Custard pie	Rainbow dream cake	Kadeena Cox	3 April 2018	5.53
5	12 muffins	Custard pie	Rainbow dream cake	Teri Hatcher	3 April 2018	5.53

=== Series 2 (2019) ===
Star Baker

No.	Signature Challenge	Technical Challenge	Showstopper Challenge	Contestants	Airdate	Viewers (millions)
1	12 brownies	Swiss roll	3D biscuit scene	John Lithgow	5 March 2019 (Note: Episode is no longer available on demand due to allegations against Russell Brand although the episode is still shown on The Great British Baking Show channel on the Roku channel.)	4.86
1	12 brownies	Swiss roll	3D biscuit scene	Jon Richardson	5 March 2019	4.86
1	12 brownies	Swiss roll	3D biscuit scene	Hannah Cockroft	5 March 2019	4.86
1	12 brownies	Swiss roll	3D biscuit scene	Russell Brand	5 March 2019	4.86
2	Topped flapjacks	6 cream horns	Meringue scene	James Acaster	12 March 2019	5.30
2	Topped flapjacks	6 cream horns	Meringue scene	Russell Tovey	12 March 2019	5.30
2	Topped flapjacks	6 cream horns	Meringue scene	Rylan Clark-Neal	12 March 2019	5.30
2	Topped flapjacks	6 cream horns	Meringue scene	Michelle Keegan	12 March 2019	5.30
3	Shortbread	Pork pies	Self-portrait cake	Johnny Vegas	19 March 2019	4.48
3	Shortbread	Pork pies	Self-portrait cake	Big Narstie / Sandi Toksvig	19 March 2019	4.48
3	Shortbread	Pork pies	Self-portrait cake	Katarina Johnson-Thompson	19 March 2019	4.48
3	Shortbread	Pork pies	Self-portrait cake	Jess Phillips	19 March 2019	4.48
4	Characterful biscuits	Chocolate Crumpets	Favourite hobby cake	Jeremy Paxman	26 March 2019	4.58
4	Characterful biscuits	Chocolate Crumpets	Favourite hobby cake	Joe Wilkinson	26 March 2019	4.58
4	Characterful biscuits	Chocolate Crumpets	Favourite hobby cake	Sally Lindsay	26 March 2019	4.58
4	Characterful biscuits	Chocolate Crumpets	Favourite hobby cake	Georgia "Toff" Toffolo	26 March 2019	4.58
5	Fruity drizzle cake	Choux pastry swans	Self-portrait towering biscuit	Nicola Adams	2 April 2019	4.60
5	Fruity drizzle cake	Choux pastry swans	Self-portrait towering biscuit	Krishnan Guru-Murthy	2 April 2019	4.60
5	Fruity drizzle cake	Choux pastry swans	Self-portrait towering biscuit	Greg Wise	2 April 2019	4.60
5	Fruity drizzle cake	Choux pastry swans	Self-portrait towering biscuit	Caroline Flack	2 April 2019	4.60

=== Series 3 (2020) ===
Star Baker

No.	Signature Challenge	Technical Challenge	Showstopper Challenge	Contestants	Airdate	Viewers (millions)
1	Giant biscuit	Mille-feuille	Choux sculpture	Louis Theroux	10 March 2020	5.00
1	Giant biscuit	Mille-feuille	Choux sculpture	Jenny Eclair	10 March 2020	5.00
1	Giant biscuit	Mille-feuille	Choux sculpture	Russell Howard	10 March 2020	5.00
1	Giant biscuit	Mille-feuille	Choux sculpture	Ovie Soko	10 March 2020	5.00
2	Roulade	6 Cannoli	Favourite place cake	Patsy Palmer	17 March 2020	5.01
2	Roulade	6 Cannoli	Favourite place cake	Richard Dreyfuss	17 March 2020	5.01
2	Roulade	6 Cannoli	Favourite place cake	James Buckley	17 March 2020	5.01
2	Roulade	6 Cannoli	Favourite place cake	Scarlett Moffatt	17 March 2020	5.01
3	Éclairs	Battenberg cake	Biggest fear cake	Johanna Konta	24 March 2020	5.70
3	Éclairs	Battenberg cake	Biggest fear cake	Tan France	24 March 2020	5.70
3	Éclairs	Battenberg cake	Biggest fear cake	Caroline Quentin	24 March 2020	5.70
3	Éclairs	Battenberg cake	Biggest fear cake	Joel Dommett	24 March 2020	5.70
4	Traybake	Mini Yorkshire puddings	Future aspiration biscuit scene	James Blunt	31 March 2020	6.33
4	Traybake	Mini Yorkshire puddings	Future aspiration biscuit scene	Alison Hammond	31 March 2020	6.33
4	Traybake	Mini Yorkshire puddings	Future aspiration biscuit scene	Alex Jones	31 March 2020	6.33
4	Traybake	Mini Yorkshire puddings	Future aspiration biscuit scene	Joe Sugg	31 March 2020	6.33
5	12 Sandwich biscuits	6 Iced buns	3D Guilty pleasure cake	Kelly Brook	7 April 2020	5.92
5	12 Sandwich biscuits	6 Iced buns	3D Guilty pleasure cake	Mo Gilligan	7 April 2020	5.92
5	12 Sandwich biscuits	6 Iced buns	3D Guilty pleasure cake	Robert Rinder	7 April 2020	5.92
5	12 Sandwich biscuits	6 Iced buns	3D Guilty pleasure cake	Carol Vorderman	7 April 2020	5.92

=== Series 4 (2021) ===
Star Baker

No.	Signature Challenge	Technical Challenge	Showstopper Challenge	Contestants	Airdate	Viewers (millions)
1	Millionaire Shortbread	4 Chocolate and raspberry tarts	Pet Peeves cake	Tom Allen	9 March 2021	6.12
1	Millionaire Shortbread	4 Chocolate and raspberry tarts	Pet Peeves cake	Rob Beckett	9 March 2021	6.12
1	Millionaire Shortbread	4 Chocolate and raspberry tarts	Pet Peeves cake	Alexandra Burke	9 March 2021	6.12
1	Millionaire Shortbread	4 Chocolate and raspberry tarts	Pet Peeves cake	Daisy Ridley	9 March 2021	6.12
2	Decorative Fruit tart	6 Cheese and chive Scones	Spirit animal marble cake	Anne-Marie	16 March 2021	5.83
2	Decorative Fruit tart	6 Cheese and chive Scones	Spirit animal marble cake	David Baddiel	16 March 2021	5.83
2	Decorative Fruit tart	6 Cheese and chive Scones	Spirit animal marble cake	Kelly Holmes	16 March 2021	5.83
2	Decorative Fruit tart	6 Cheese and chive Scones	Spirit animal marble cake	James McAvoy	16 March 2021	5.83
3	Vegetable Traybake	4 Queen of Puddings	Biscuit selfie of themselves at work	Nick Grimshaw	23 March 2021	5.45
3	Vegetable Traybake	4 Queen of Puddings	Biscuit selfie of themselves at work	Philippa Perry	23 March 2021	5.45
3	Vegetable Traybake	4 Queen of Puddings	Biscuit selfie of themselves at work	Dizzee Rascal	23 March 2021	5.45
3	Vegetable Traybake	4 Queen of Puddings	Biscuit selfie of themselves at work	Reece Shearsmith	23 March 2021	5.45
4	Cocktail Fondant Fancies	Cherry Lattice Pie	3D Biscuit and Meringue Scene	Stacey Dooley	30 March 2021	5.09
4	Cocktail Fondant Fancies	Cherry Lattice Pie	3D Biscuit and Meringue Scene	KSI	30 March 2021	5.09
4	Cocktail Fondant Fancies	Cherry Lattice Pie	3D Biscuit and Meringue Scene	Katherine Ryan	30 March 2021	5.09
4	Cocktail Fondant Fancies	Cherry Lattice Pie	3D Biscuit and Meringue Scene	Jade Thirlwall	30 March 2021	5.09
5	8 Choux buns	12 Financiers	Chocolate Bucket List Cake	Ade Adepitan	6 April 2021	5.21
5	8 Choux buns	12 Financiers	Chocolate Bucket List Cake	John Bishop	6 April 2021	5.21
5	8 Choux buns	12 Financiers	Chocolate Bucket List Cake	Nadine Coyle	6 April 2021	5.21
5	8 Choux buns	12 Financiers	Chocolate Bucket List Cake	Anneka Rice	6 April 2021	5.21

=== Series 5 (2022) ===
Star Baker

No.	Signature Challenge	Technical Challenge	Showstopper Challenge	Contestants	Airdate	Viewers (millions)
1	Animal biscuits	12 Maple and Pecan madeleines	3D Secret Talent choux sculptures	Clara Amfo	22 March 2022	3.24
1	Animal biscuits	12 Maple and Pecan madeleines	3D Secret Talent choux sculptures	Blake Harrison	22 March 2022	3.24
1	Animal biscuits	12 Maple and Pecan madeleines	3D Secret Talent choux sculptures	Alex Horne	22 March 2022	3.24
1	Animal biscuits	12 Maple and Pecan madeleines	3D Secret Talent choux sculptures	Emma Willis	22 March 2022	3.24
2	Fruit turnovers	4 Chocolate fondants	Embarrassing moment meringue scene	Yung Filly	29 March 2022	3.42
2	Fruit turnovers	4 Chocolate fondants	Embarrassing moment meringue scene	Gareth Malone	29 March 2022	3.42
2	Fruit turnovers	4 Chocolate fondants	Embarrassing moment meringue scene	Ruby Wax	29 March 2022	3.42
2	Fruit turnovers	4 Chocolate fondants	Embarrassing moment meringue scene	Laura Whitmore	29 March 2022	3.42
3	Stained glass biscuits	6 Raspberry doughnuts	Before fame novelty cake	Ed Gamble	5 April 2022	3.42
3	Stained glass biscuits	6 Raspberry doughnuts	Before fame novelty cake	Example	5 April 2022	3.42
3	Stained glass biscuits	6 Raspberry doughnuts	Before fame novelty cake	Matt Lucas	5 April 2022	3.42
3	Stained glass biscuits	6 Raspberry doughnuts	Before fame novelty cake	Annie Mac	5 April 2022	3.42
4	Meringue roulades	18 Lemon and pistachio biscotti	3D Favourite childhood memory cake	Mo Farah	12 April 2022	2.97
4	Meringue roulades	18 Lemon and pistachio biscotti	3D Favourite childhood memory cake	Katherine Kelly	12 April 2022	2.97
4	Meringue roulades	18 Lemon and pistachio biscotti	3D Favourite childhood memory cake	Ben Miller	12 April 2022	2.97
4	Meringue roulades	18 Lemon and pistachio biscotti	3D Favourite childhood memory cake	Motsi Mabuse	12 April 2022	2.97
5	Marble Cake	Almond and cherry roly-poly	Hero biscuit portrait	Sophie Morgan	19 April 2022	3.78
5	Marble Cake	Almond and cherry roly-poly	Hero biscuit portrait	Ellie Goulding	19 April 2022	3.78
5	Marble Cake	Almond and cherry roly-poly	Hero biscuit portrait	Tracy-Ann Oberman	19 April 2022	3.78
5	Marble Cake	Almond and cherry roly-poly	Hero biscuit portrait	Mawaan Rizwan	19 April 2022	3.78

=== Series 6 (2023) ===
Star Baker

No.	Signature Challenge	Technical Challenge	Showstopper Challenge	Contestants	Airdate	Viewers (millions)
1	Mini Savoury Pies	6 Macarons	3D Meringue Celebrity fail Scene	Jesy Nelson	19 March 2023	3.92
1	Mini Savoury Pies	6 Macarons	3D Meringue Celebrity fail Scene	David Schwimmer	19 March 2023	3.92
1	Mini Savoury Pies	6 Macarons	3D Meringue Celebrity fail Scene	Rose Matafeo	19 March 2023	3.92
1	Mini Savoury Pies	6 Macarons	3D Meringue Celebrity fail Scene	Tom Davis	19 March 2023	3.92
2	Sandwich cake	Treacle Tart	Earliest memory choux buns	AJ Odudu	26 March 2023	3.71
2	Sandwich cake	Treacle Tart	Earliest memory choux buns	Gemma Collins	26 March 2023	3.71
2	Sandwich cake	Treacle Tart	Earliest memory choux buns	Jessica Hynes	26 March 2023	3.71
2	Sandwich cake	Treacle Tart	Earliest memory choux buns	Tim Key	26 March 2023	3.71
3	Quiche	8 Bourbon biscuits	Best day off novelty cake	Adele Roberts	2 April 2023	3.02
3	Quiche	8 Bourbon biscuits	Best day off novelty cake	David Morrissey	2 April 2023	3.02
3	Quiche	8 Bourbon biscuits	Best day off novelty cake	Tom Daley	2 April 2023	3.02
3	Quiche	8 Bourbon biscuits	Best day off novelty cake	Lucy Beaumont	2 April 2023	3.02
4	12 Jaffa Cakes	4 Cheese & Onion slices	3D Biscuit home town scene	Paddy McGuinness	9 April 2023	3.23
4	12 Jaffa Cakes	4 Cheese & Onion slices	3D Biscuit home town scene	Joe Thomas	9 April 2023	3.23
4	12 Jaffa Cakes	4 Cheese & Onion slices	3D Biscuit home town scene	Coleen Nolan	9 April 2023	3.23
4	12 Jaffa Cakes	4 Cheese & Onion slices	3D Biscuit home town scene	Ellie Taylor	9 April 2023	3.23
5	Cheesecake	4 Hot dog buns	Novelty cake of first celebrity crush	Mike Wozniak	16 April 2023	3.12
5	Cheesecake	4 Hot dog buns	Novelty cake of first celebrity crush	Deborah Meaden	16 April 2023	3.12
5	Cheesecake	4 Hot dog buns	Novelty cake of first celebrity crush	Judi Love	16 April 2023	3.12
5	Cheesecake	4 Hot dog buns	Novelty cake of first celebrity crush	Jay Blades	16 April 2023	3.12

=== Series 7 (2024) ===
Star Baker

No.	Signature Challenge	Technical Challenge	Showstopper Challenge	Contestants	Airdate	Viewers (millions)
1	8 Cake pops	4 Pretzels	Biscuit portrait of Paul and Prue	Jodie Whittaker	17 March 2024	2.96
1	8 Cake pops	4 Pretzels	Biscuit portrait of Paul and Prue	Paloma Faith	17 March 2024	2.96
1	8 Cake pops	4 Pretzels	Biscuit portrait of Paul and Prue	Munya Chawawa	17 March 2024	2.96
1	8 Cake pops	4 Pretzels	Biscuit portrait of Paul and Prue	Spencer Matthews	17 March 2024	2.96
2	12 Biscuit people	9 Fondant fancies	Biggest failure cake	Danny Dyer	24 March 2024	2.92
2	12 Biscuit people	9 Fondant fancies	Biggest failure cake	Rhod Gilbert	24 March 2024	2.92
2	12 Biscuit people	9 Fondant fancies	Biggest failure cake	Yinka Bokinni	24 March 2024	2.92
2	12 Biscuit people	9 Fondant fancies	Biggest failure cake	Leigh Francis	24 March 2024	2.92
3	Arctic Roll	8 Vegan iced rings	3D biggest fear meringue scene	David O'Doherty	31 March 2024	2.86
3	Arctic Roll	8 Vegan iced rings	3D biggest fear meringue scene	Oti Mabuse	31 March 2024	2.86
3	Arctic Roll	8 Vegan iced rings	3D biggest fear meringue scene	Gabby Logan	31 March 2024	2.86
3	Arctic Roll	8 Vegan iced rings	3D biggest fear meringue scene	Suzi Ruffell	31 March 2024	2.86
4	8 Iced buns	Chocolate & Raspberry roulade	Biscuit portrait Celebrity lookalike	Greg James	7 April 2024	2.90
4	8 Iced buns	Chocolate & Raspberry roulade	Biscuit portrait Celebrity lookalike	Dermot O'Leary	7 April 2024	2.90
4	8 Iced buns	Chocolate & Raspberry roulade	Biscuit portrait Celebrity lookalike	Fern Brady	7 April 2024	2.90
4	8 Iced buns	Chocolate & Raspberry roulade	Biscuit portrait Celebrity lookalike	Mel B	7 April 2024	2.90
5	12 Biscuit bars	6 Custard slices	Best friend novelty cake	Richard Coles	14 April 2024	3.16
5	12 Biscuit bars	6 Custard slices	Best friend novelty cake	Sara Cox	14 April 2024	3.16
5	12 Biscuit bars	6 Custard slices	Best friend novelty cake	Joe Locke	14 April 2024	3.16
5	12 Biscuit bars	6 Custard slices	Best friend novelty cake	Adam Hills	14 April 2024	3.16

=== Series 8 (2025) ===
Star Baker

No.	Signature Challenge	Technical Challenge	Showstopper Challenge	Contestants	Airdate	Viewers (millions)
1	Scones	12 Chocolate fingers	Career highlight cake	Chris Ramsey	16 March 2025	2.80
1	Scones	12 Chocolate fingers	Career highlight cake	Rosie Ramsey	16 March 2025	2.80
1	Scones	12 Chocolate fingers	Career highlight cake	Scarlette Douglas	16 March 2025	2.80
1	Scones	12 Chocolate fingers	Career highlight cake	Stuart Douglas	16 March 2025	2.80
2	12 novelty Cupcakes	10 Raspberry & Hazelnut Flapjacks	Biscuit romantic scene	Amelia Dimoldenberg	23 March 2025	2.96
2	12 novelty Cupcakes	10 Raspberry & Hazelnut Flapjacks	Biscuit romantic scene	Roman Kemp	23 March 2025	2.96
2	12 novelty Cupcakes	10 Raspberry & Hazelnut Flapjacks	Biscuit romantic scene	Maxine Peake	23 March 2025	2.96
2	12 novelty Cupcakes	10 Raspberry & Hazelnut Flapjacks	Biscuit romantic scene	Sarah Beeny	23 March 2025	2.96
3	8 mini loaf Cakes	12 tear and share chilli cheese buns	Hidden talent choux pastry	Phil Wang	30 March 2025	3.07
3	8 mini loaf Cakes	12 tear and share chilli cheese buns	Hidden talent choux pastry	Kate Garraway	30 March 2025	3.07
3	8 mini loaf Cakes	12 tear and share chilli cheese buns	Hidden talent choux pastry	Sophie Willan	30 March 2025	3.07
3	8 mini loaf Cakes	12 tear and share chilli cheese buns	Hidden talent choux pastry	Gbemisola Ikumelo	30 March 2025	3.07
4	6 shaped Crumpets	Lambeth cake	Celebrity hero pie-trait	Adam Buxton	6 April 2025	3.02
4	6 shaped Crumpets	Lambeth cake	Celebrity hero pie-trait	Meera Syal	6 April 2025	3.02
4	6 shaped Crumpets	Lambeth cake	Celebrity hero pie-trait	Tommy Tiernan	6 April 2025	3.02
4	6 shaped Crumpets	Lambeth cake	Celebrity hero pie-trait	Self Esteem	6 April 2025	3.02
5	12 filled Brandy snaps	4 Passionfruit filled Raspberry ripple filled Cheesecakes	Best kept secret cake	Gloria Hunniford	13 April 2025	3.11
5	12 filled Brandy snaps	4 Passionfruit filled Raspberry ripple filled Cheesecakes	Best kept secret cake	Ellie Goldstein	13 April 2025	3.11
5	12 filled Brandy snaps	4 Passionfruit filled Raspberry ripple filled Cheesecakes	Best kept secret cake	Jim Howick	13 April 2025	3.11
5	12 filled Brandy snaps	4 Passionfruit filled Raspberry ripple filled Cheesecakes	Best kept secret cake	Jamali Maddix	13 April 2025	3.11

=== Series 9 (2026) ===
The final episode of the series, originally scheduled to air on 19 April, was not broadcast due to allegations against contestant Scott Mills, which emerged after the episode was filmed.

Star Baker

No.	Signature Challenge	Technical Challenge	Showstopper Challenge	Contestants	Airdate	Viewers (millions)
1	8 Breakfast pastries	10 Vegan Matcha biscuits	Weirdest place fallen asleep cake	Roisin Conaty	22 March 2026 (Note: To date, Joe Wilkinson is the only celebrity to be awarded Star Baker twice)	4.78
1	8 Breakfast pastries	10 Vegan Matcha biscuits	Weirdest place fallen asleep cake	Joe Wilkinson	22 March 2026	4.78
1	8 Breakfast pastries	10 Vegan Matcha biscuits	Weirdest place fallen asleep cake	Rose Matafeo	22 March 2026	4.78
1	8 Breakfast pastries	10 Vegan Matcha biscuits	Weirdest place fallen asleep cake	Judi Love	22 March 2026	4.78
1	8 Breakfast pastries	10 Vegan Matcha biscuits	Weirdest place fallen asleep cake	Tom Davis	22 March 2026	4.78
1	8 Breakfast pastries	10 Vegan Matcha biscuits	Weirdest place fallen asleep cake	Jon Richardson	22 March 2026	4.78
2	Traybake	Tarte tatin	3D Biscuit toy	JoJo Siwa	29 March 2026	5.20
2	Traybake	Tarte tatin	3D Biscuit toy	Richard Herring	29 March 2026	5.20
2	Traybake	Tarte tatin	3D Biscuit toy	Molly-Mae Hague	29 March 2026	5.20
2	Traybake	Tarte tatin	3D Biscuit toy	Babatunde Aléshé	29 March 2026	5.20
3	Mini Rolls	Syrup sponge puddings	Choux pastry delight	Vicky Pattison	5 April 2026	4.89
3	Mini Rolls	Syrup sponge puddings	Choux pastry delight	Sam Thompson	5 April 2026	4.89
3	Mini Rolls	Syrup sponge puddings	Choux pastry delight	Ambika Mod	5 April 2026	4.89
3	Mini Rolls	Syrup sponge puddings	Choux pastry delight	Rose Ayling-Ellis	5 April 2026	4.89
3	Mini Rolls	Syrup sponge puddings	Choux pastry delight	Alex Brooker	5 April 2026	4.89
4	Savoury Rolls	3 Vegan Fruit tarts	Ridiculous purchase Novelty cake	Nella Rose	12 April 2026	5.90
4	Savoury Rolls	3 Vegan Fruit tarts	Ridiculous purchase Novelty cake	Mark Wright	12 April 2026	5.90
4	Savoury Rolls	3 Vegan Fruit tarts	Ridiculous purchase Novelty cake	Emmett J. Scanlan	12 April 2026	5.90
4	Savoury Rolls	3 Vegan Fruit tarts	Ridiculous purchase Novelty cake	Mutya Buena	12 April 2026	5.90
4	Savoury Rolls	3 Vegan Fruit tarts	Ridiculous purchase Novelty cake	Ralf Little	12 April 2026	5.90
5	–	–	–	Scott Mills	Not broadcast	–
5	–	–	–	Rag'n'Bone Man	Not broadcast	–
5	–	–	–	Edith Bowman	Not broadcast	–
5	–	–	–	Aston Merrygold	Not broadcast	–

== See also ==
- List of The Great British Bake Off contestants
- Finalists of The Great British Bake Off (series 1–7)
- Finalists of The Great British Bake Off (series 8–present)
