= The Great British Bake Off series 17 =

Seventeenth series of The Great British Bake Off

The Great British Bake Off
- Series 17
- Starring: Noel Fielding; Alison Hammond; Paul Hollywood; Nigella Lawson
- No. of episodes: 10

Release
- Original network: Channel 4
- Original release: 22 September 2026 – present

Series chronology
- ← Previous; Series 16

The seventeenth series of The Great British Bake Off began on 22 September 2026. It will again be presented by Alison Hammond and Noel Fielding. Paul Hollywood returned as a judge, alongside Nigella Lawson, who replaced Prue Leith following her departure.

== Production ==
Following the conclusion of the previous series, it was confirmed that The Great British Bake Off would return for a seventeenth series. In January 2026, Prue Leith announced she would be stepping down as a judge after nine years and said that "now feels like the right time to step back [...] There's so much I'd like to do." Leith also cited feeling unsteady on set as another reason for leaving. Nigella Lawson was subsequently announced as her replacement. The first trailer for the series aired in August 2026, featuring hosts Alison Hammond and Noel Fielding and judges Paul Hollywood and Lawson, with each of them holding a fork and battling to be the first to try one of the bakes. Hollywood begins and says "Ooh go on then", before Fielding intercepts by telling him "Not so fast blue eyes". Hammond is next and tells them "Ladies' first" before Lawson coughs and approaches. It is accompanied by the tagline "The bake is back". Prior to the beginning of the series, it was announced that the spin-off The Great British Bake Off: An Extra Slice had been cancelled and would be replaced by another spin off, Second Helpings, hosted by Jon Richardson and Judi Love. The series began on 22 September 2026. Prue Leith makes a brief appearance at the start of episode one, in a parody of Doctor Who where she apparently 'regenerates' into Nigella Lawson.

== Bakers ==
The bakers competing in the series were announced on 7 September 2026.

Baker	Age	Hometown	Occupation	Finish	Place
Danni Noke	25	Dorset, England	HGV service centre administrator	Episode 2	12th
Shannon Amy	29	Gloucestershire, England	Project planner & scheduler	Episode 3	11th
Molly Chauhan	31	London, England	Accessibility coordinator	Episode 4	10th
Nikki Porter	50	London, England	Advertising post-producer	Episode 4	9th (withdrew)
Yannis Ali	28	London, England (Note: Originally from Vienna)	Paediatric doctor	Episode 5	8th
Clara Satchell-Silva	24	Hertfordshire, England (Note: Originally from Aveiro, Portugal)	Marketing graduate	Episode 6	7th
Gary Harding	67	Nottinghamshire, England	Retired garment technologist	Episode 7	6th
Elizabeth "Connie" Lewis	63	London, England	NHS hospital discharge lead	Episode 8	5th
Gabe Capes	32	West Midlands, England	Artist & drag king	Episode 9	4th
Mo Mahir	21	West Midlands, England	Law student		
Moyin Odeniran	22	Essex, England	Political economy student		
Tom Whittaker	25	Halifax, West Yorkshire, England	Hairdresser		

== Results summary ==
Elimination chart
Baker	1	2	3	4	5	6	7	8	9	10
Mo	SB	SAFE	SAFE	SAFE	HIGH	LOW	HIGH	HIGH	SB	
Moyin	SAFE	SAFE	SAFE	SAFE	SAFE	SAFE	SAFE	SB	LOW^{[c]}	
Tom	HIGH	SB	SAFE	SB	HIGH	SB	SAFE	SAFE	LOW^{[c]}	
Gabe	SAFE	SAFE	SAFE	SAFE	SAFE	SAFE	SB	LOW	OUT^{[c]}	
Connie	SAFE	HIGH	HIGH	SAFE	SB	SAFE	LOW	OUT		
Gary	HIGH	SAFE	SAFE	SAFE	SAFE	SAFE	OUT			
Clara	SAFE	HIGH	SB	HIGH	LOW	OUT				
Yannis	SAFE	LOW	SAFE	LOW	OUT					
Nikki	SAFE	SAFE	SAFE	WD^{[b]}						
Molly	LOW	SAFE	LOW	OUT						
Shannon	N/A^{[a]}	SAFE	OUT							
Danni	LOW	OUT								

^{[a]} Shannon was ill and unable to compete during the showstopper challenge in episode 1. As a result, the judges decided that it was unfair to eliminate anyone in her absence.
^{[b]} Nikki left the tent for family reasons and was unable to compete in the technical and showstopper challenges in episode 4. Her departure from the show was confirmed after the episode's premiere.
^{[c]} With the exception of Mo, none of the bakers could be considered for Star Baker due to missteps in the showstopper round and were all considered for elimination.

Colour key:

Baker was one of the judges' least favourite bakers that week, but was not eliminated.
Baker was one of the judges' favourite bakers that week, but was not the Star Baker.
Baker got through to the next round.
Baker withdrew from the show.
Baker was eliminated.
Baker was the Star Baker.
Baker was a series runner-up.
Baker was the series winner.

== Episodes ==
=== Episode 1: Cake ===
The first episode was Cake Week. For the first challenge, the bakers were given 2 1/4 hours to produce a chocolate stout cake with at least one filling or topping. For the technical challenge, set by Nigella, the bakers were asked to bake a coffee and walnut cake. They were tasked with creating their own recipe based on a Bake Off illustration with minimal detail, and were then given two hours to complete the challenge. For the showstopper challenge, the bakers were asked to make a self portrait cake with at least two tiers in four hours.

Baker	Signature (Chocolate Stout Cake)	Technical (Coffee and Walnut Cake)	Showstopper (Self Portrait Cake)	Result
Clara	"Taste of Two Homes" Chocolate Stout Cake	8th	"Impression of Me" Portrait Cake	Safe
Connie	"Jamaican Dragon" Chocolate Stout Cake	6th	Chocolate & Berry Portrait Cake	Safe
Danni	"I'm a Little Cakey, Port & Stout" Chocolate Stout Cake	11th	"Pixel Perfect Patch" Portrait Cake	Safe
Gabe	"Pint & Peanuts with Dad" Chocolate Stout Cake	3rd	"Blu Romantic" Portrait Cake	Safe
Gary	"My Uncle Guiness" Chocolate Stout Cake	2nd	"Home at the Stables" Portrait Cake	Safe
Mo	Peanut & Caramel Chocolate Stout Cake	4th	Lemon & Blueberry Portrait Cake	Star Baker
Molly	Spiced Chocolate Stout Cake	12th	Lemon & Mango Portrait Cake	Safe
Moyin	Nigerian Chocolate Stout Cake	9th	"Head of Heritage" Portrait Cake	Safe
Nikki	Blackberry & Malt Mascarpone Chocolate Stout Cake	5th	"Sunflower Serenity" Portrait Cake	Safe
Shannon	"Enchanted Black Forest" Chocolate Stout Cake	10th	Did not compete	Safe
Tom	"Tipsy Cherry" Chocolate Stout Cake	1st	"My Favourite Cartoon" Portrait Cake	Safe
Yannis	"Sacher Symphony" Chocolate Stout Cake	7th	"The Pointillism Canvas" Portrait Cake	Safe

=== Episode 2: Biscuit ===
The second episode was Biscuit Week. For the first challenge, the bakers were given two hours to produce thirty identical American-style cookies with an appropriate decorative finish. For the technical challenge, set by Paul, the bakers were asked to bake twenty-four iced gems consisting of an orange shortbread biscuit topped with a rainbow-coloured star of royal icing. They were given five minutes to inspect and taste a few iced gems with no additional recipe, and were then given 1 1/2 hours to complete the challenge. For the showstopper challenge, the bakers were asked to make a biscuit mosaic depicting an image or a pattern using an array of smaller biscuits that have been fixed with an edible glue on a delicious biscuit backing in four hours.

Baker	Signature (30 American Cookies)	Technical (24 Iced Gems)	Showstopper (Biscuit Mosaic)	Result
Clara	'Til Tiramisu Do Us Part	10th	"Euro Summer" Biscuit Mosaic	Safe
Connie	"Chocolate & Banana" Cookies	1st	"Jamaican Flag" Biscuit Mosaic	Safe
Danni	"SnickerSnickerdoodle" Cookies	11th	"LOVELETTER.TXT.VSB" Biscuit Mosaic	Eliminated
Gabe	Almond & Sour Cherry Cookies	6th	"Uncle Tom's Garden" Biscuit Mosaic	Safe
Gary	"Choccies from Heaven" Cookies	12th	"Memory Clock" Biscuit Mosaic	Safe
Mo	Lemon Meringue Cookies	2nd	"Toucan" Biscuit Mosaic	Safe
Molly	Chocolate & Hazelnut Cookies	7th	"Disability Pride" Biscuit Mosaic	Safe
Moyin	"Moriyike's Miso Caramel" Cookies	4th	"Golden Horizon" Biscuit Mosaic	Safe
Nikki	"Tom's Favourite Chocolate Bar" Cookies	9th	"Liccle Ray of Sunflower" Biscuit Mosaic	Safe
Shannon	"Strawberries, Cream & Centre Court Dreams" Cookies	5th	"Hidden Harvest Path" Biscuit Mosaic	Safe
Tom	"Nordic Crunch" Cookies	3rd	"Burn Book" Biscuit Mosaic	Star Baker
Yannis	"Street Chai" Cookies	8th	"Norfolk Broads Reflections" Biscuit Mosaic	Safe

=== Episode 3: Audience Choice ===
The third episode was Audience Choice Week with all challenges being decided by the general public. For the first challenge, the bakers were given three hours to make a baked cheesecake with their relatives. For the technical challenge, the bakers were asked to bake any recipe of their choosing using ingredients from a mystery box. They were given five minutes to inspect the mystery box and plan their recipe, and were then given two hours to complete the challenge. For the showstopper challenge, the bakers were asked to make any bake of their choosing that is also wearable in 4 1/2 hours.

Baker	Signature (Baked Cheesecake)	Technical (Mystery Box)		Showstopper (Wearable Bake)	Result
Clara	"Honky Tonk" Cheesecake	3rd	Lemon & Almond Cake	"Piña Couture Handbag" Showstopper	Star Baker
Connie	Ginger and Lemon Basque Cheesecake	6th	Chocolate & Orange Cake	"Mother of the Bride" Showstopper	Safe
Gabe	"You're Coconuts" Cheesecake	1st	Citrus Meringue Tart	"Crown It" Showstopper	Safe
Gary	"Cherry Lake" Cheesecake	8th	Lemon Drizzle Loaf	"Bobilicious Hat" Showstopper	Safe
Mo	Cardamom & Strawberry Cheesecake	2nd	Paris-Brest	"Angel Wings" Showstopper	Safe
Molly	Raspberry Cheesecake	10th	Lemon & Raspberry Cake	"Floral Blossom Cap" Showstopper	Safe
Moyin	Orange Basque Cheesecake	5th	Lemon & Raspberry Cake	"Lambeth Top Hat" Showstopper	Safe
Nikki	"Cherry Bakewell" Cheesecake	4th	Lemon Meringue Tart	"Mojito Sombrero" Showstopper	Safe
Shannon	"The Naughty Bailey" Cheesecake	11th	Lemon Drizzle Loaf	"The Fairy Wings of the Painted Brook" Showstopper	Eliminated
Tom	"Alex's Fave Flavours" Cheesecake	7th	Citrus & Raspberry Cake	"Serving Dolly's Wig" Showstopper	Safe
Yannis	Honey, Fig & Walnet Käsekuchen	9th	Almond Esterhazy Torte	"Bengali Groom's Crown" Showstopper	Safe

=== Episode 4: Bread ===
The fourth episode was Bread Week. For the first challenge, the bakers were given three hours to make a garlic bread with a yeasted dough. For the Technical challenge, set by Paul, the bakers were given one hour to make eight flatbreads filled with roasted grapes and blue cheese. The Showstopper challenge was an enriched dough celebratory breads with a centerpiece and featuring smaller breads. The bakers were given one hour after the technical challenge to start their dough, and 4 1/2 hours the following day.

Baker	Signature (Garlic Bread)	Technical (8 Flatbreads with Roasted Grapes and Blue Cheese)	Showstopper (Festive Enriched Bread Centerpiece)	Result
Clara	Thai Basil and Garlic Bread	2nd	"Crowned in Fruit & Spice" Bread Display	Safe
Connie	Garlic Star Bread	5th	"Easter Bread Basket" Display	Safe
Gabe	Monday Night Pizza Garlic Bread	1st	"Summer Solstice Party" Bread Display	Safe
Gary	Cheesy Tear and Share Garlic Bread	9th	"Christmas Time" Festive Bread Display	Safe
Mo	Naga Garlic Bread	6th	"Eid Night Babka & Milk Bread" Display	Safe
Molly	Braided Tear and Share Garlic Bread	7th	"Harvest Festival Basket" Bread Display	Eliminated
Moyin	Pesto Garlic Bread	3rd	"Christmas Across Borders" Bread Display	Safe
Nikki	Cheesy Pesto Tear and Share Garlic Bread	Did not compete	Did not compete	Withdrew (Note: Nikki's departure from the show was confirmed after the episode's premiere.)
Tom	Roasted Garlic and Cheddar Garlic bread	4th	"The Great Gonk" Bread Display	Star Baker
Yannis	Great Garlic Globe	8th	"Viennese Winter Market" Bread Display	Safe

=== Episode 5: Dessert ===
The fifth episode was Dessert Week. For the first challenge, the bakers were given 1 1/2 hours to make eight self saucing puddings. All bakers were given a staggered start time, with 10 minutes between each start. For the Technical challenge, set by Nigella, the bakers were asked to make a Bread and Butter Pudding enhanced however they chose. The bakers were given the basics of a recipe and five minutes to plan and browse the gingham pantry, and were then given 1 1/2 hours to complete the challenge. The Showstopper challenge was to create a retro pudding trolley with three different desserts in 4 1/2 hours.

Baker	Signature (Self-saucing puddings)	Technical (Bread and butter pudding)	Showstopper (Retro pudding trollies)	Result
Clara	Dulce De Leche Puddings	3rd	"Sugar Rush Express" Dessert Trolley	Safe
Connie	Chocolate Orange Puddings	2nd	"Retro" Dessert Trolley	Star Baker
Gabe	Boozy snoozy Self-saucing puddings	4th	"Puddings on Toast" Dessert Trolley	Safe
Gary	Chocolate and Irish Cream Self Saucing Pudding	1st	"Baked Indulgence" Dessert Trolley	Safe
Mo	Chocolate and Hazelnut Self-saucing Puddings	6th	Dessert Trolley	Safe
Moyin	Chocolate Orange Fondants	8th	"From Lagos to London" Dessert Trolley	Safe
Tom	Apple Crumble Self-saucing puddings	5th	"Tipsy" Dessert Trolley	Safe
Yannis	Apple Cinnamon and Raisin Self-saucing Pudding	7th	"British Nostalgia" Dessert Trolley	Eliminated

=== Episode 6: Pastry ===
The sixth episode was Pastry Week. For the Signature challenge, the bakers were given 2 1/2 hours to bake eight hand-held savoury pies. For the Technical challenge, set by Nigella, the bakers were asked to bake a take on Nigella's Polish Karpatka in 1 3/4 hours. The Showstopper challenge was to bake one freeform decorative pie, either sweet or savoury, in 3 1/2 hours.

Baker	Signature (8 Handheld savoury pies)	Technical (Nigella's Polish Karpatka)	Showstopper (Freeform decorative pie)	Result
Clara	"Drunken Deer" Handheld Savoury Pies	7th	"Starry Bites" Decorative Pie	Eliminated
Connie	Jerk Chicken Handheld Savoury Pies	6th	"Curried Sweet Potato Snake" Decorative Pie	Safe
Gabe	"Bostin Brummie Balti" Handheld Savoury Pies	3rd	"Lincolnshire Sausage Dog" Decorative Pie	Safe
Gary	Mince Beef, Onion, and Potato Handheld Savoury Pies	4th	"Mariner's" Decorative Pie	Safe
Mo	"Creamy Chicken" Handheld Savoury Pies	5th	"Chai Spiced Pear" Decorative Pie	Safe
Moyin	"Nigerian Meat" Handheld Savoury Pies	1st	"Head of the Orchard" Decorative Pie	Safe
Tom	"Banh Mi" Handheld Savoury Pies	2nd	"Stop-Motion Chicken" Decorative Pie	Star Baker

=== Episode 7: Free-From Party ===
The seventh episode was Free-From Party Week. For the Signature challenge, the bakers were given 2 1/2 hours to bake gluten-free pastries fit for a children's party, with either a sweet or savoury filling. For the Technical challenge, set by Nigella, the bakers were asked to bake a vegan animal cake in 2 1/2 hours. The bakers each chose an animal at random from a gingham bag, and were given two minutes to sketch out the design before baking. The Showstopper challenge was to bake a children's birthday cake, either dairy-free, gluten-free or plant based, with an interactive element, in 4 hours.

Baker	Signature (Gluten-free pastries)	Technical (Vegan animal cake)		Showstopper (Free-from children's birthday cake)	Result
Connie	"Butterflies" Gluten-Free Pastries	6th	Bee	"The Problem that Can't Be Solved" Vegan Party Cake	Safe
Gabe	"Ladybird" Gluten-Free Pastries	2nd	Dinosaur	"The Big Bug Hunt" Gluten-Free Party Cake	Star Baker
Gary	"Gazza the Caterpillar" Gluten-Free Pastries	5th	Axolotl	"Birthday Brew" Gluten-Free Party Cake	Eliminated
Mo	"Toaster Tarts" Gluten-Free Pastries	4th	Bear	Gluten-Free Vacuum Cake	Safe
Moyin	"Little Monster Eyes" Gluten-Free Pastries	3rd	Whale	"The Great Dino Dig" Vegan Party Cake	Safe
Tom	"Little Monsters" Gluten-Free Pastries	1st	Fox	"Swampy Surprise" Gluten-Free Party Cake	Safe

=== Episode 8: Caramel ===
The eighth episode, the quarter-final, was Caramel Week. In the Signature, the bakers were asked to bake a treacle tart (with golden syrup made from scratch), with an accompaniment in 2 1/2 hours. The technical, set by Paul, was to bake a millionaire's shortbread in 1 1/2 hours. In the Showstopper, the bakers were asked to make a nougatine sculpture with a praline dessert, inspired by the Hungarian grillazstorta in 4 hours.

Baker	Signature (Decorative treacle tart)	Technical (Millionaire's Shortbread)	Showstopper (Nougatine structure)	Result
Connie	Classic Treacle Tart	4th	"Thank You Myke" Nougatine Sculpture	Eliminated
Gabe	Almond & Orange Treacle Tart	3rd	"Mighty Mariners" Nougatine Sculpture	Safe
Mo	"Apple Crumble" Treacle Tart	5th	"Baby Shower" Nougatine Sculpture	Safe
Moyin	"Sticky Toffee" Treacle Tart	2nd	"Omo Oba" Nougatine Sculpture	Star Baker
Tom	"PB & J" Treacle Tart	1st	"Otley Run" Nougatine Sculpture	Safe

=== Episode 9: Patisserie ===
The ninth episode, the semi-final, was patisserie week. For their Signature challenge, the bakers were asked to bake 12 babas in 2 3/4 hours. The Technical was set by Paul, to bake a Gateau Concorde in 2 1/2 hours. In the Showstopper challenge, the bakers were asked to bake 12 themed petits gateaux served on an edible centrepiece, in 4 1/2 hours.

Baker	Signature (12 babas)	Technical (Gateau Concorde)	Showstopper (Petits gateaux)	Result
Gabe	Hazelnut Babas	3rd	Greenhouse Petits Gateaux	Eliminated
Mo	Lemon Babas	1st	Fruit Box Petits Gateaux	Star Baker
Moyin	Zobo Citrus Babas	4th	"The Forbidden Fruit" Petits Gateaux	Safe
Tom	Limoncello Babas	2nd	"Wicked" Petits Gateaux	Safe

== Ratings ==
Episode no.	Airdate	7-day viewers (millions)	28-day viewers (millions)	Channel 4 weekly ranking	Weekly ranking all channels
1	22 September 2026	7.19	8.51	1	1
2	29 September 2026	7.08	8.21	1	3
3	6 October 2026	6.83		1	3
4	13 October 2026	6.55		1	3
5	20 October 2026	6.50		1	3
6	27 October 2026	6.53		1	5
