= The Great Kenyan Bake Off =

Kenyan reality TV cooking series

- Genre: Baking; Cooking
- Presented by: Nick Ndeda; June Gachui
- Judges: Kiran Jethwa; Myra Ndungu
- Country of origin: Kenya
- Original language: English
- No. of series: 2
- No. of episodes: 20

Original release
- Release: 7 October 2019 – present

Related
- The Great British Bake Off

The Great Kenyan Bake Off is a Kenyan reality TV cooking series based on the successful BBC show The Great British Bake Off. It premiered on 7 October 2019, and has been broadcast for two seasons.

== Format ==
The show consists of 10 episodes where in each episode the bakers are tasked with two different challenges; a signature bake and a technical bake or a technical bake and a showstopper. Unlike The Great British Bake Off, the bakers only face two challenges each episode, the bakes are then critically examined by the judges who will then choose a "Star Baker" and a baker to be eliminated from the competition. Twelve contestants were chosen for each series.

Signature Challenge: This challenge is for the amateur bakers to show off their tried-and-tested recipes that are rustic and altogether home-made-looking.
Technical Challenge: This challenge shows who can follow instructions, but who also has the technical knowledge and experience to produce the finished product. The bakers are all given the same recipe, which is set by the judges, and are not told beforehand what the challenge will be. The finished product is ranked from worst to best, with the judges not knowing who produced which.
Showstopper Challenge: This challenge is for the bakers to show off their unique skills and talent. The judges are looking for a bake that is both of a professional appearance but also in taste.

== Series overview ==
| Series | Episodes | Premiere | Finale | Runners-up | Winner |
|---|---|---|---|---|---|
| 1 | 10 | 7 October 2019 | 9 December 2019 | Adeline Prima Serrao | Rosemary Akoth Ligondo |
| 1 | 10 | 7 October 2019 | 9 December 2019 | Samira Ali | Rosemary Akoth Ligondo |
| 2 | 10 | 5 October 2020 | 14 December 2020 | Chetna Desai | Charity Kamau |
| 2 | 10 | 5 October 2020 | 14 December 2020 | Joe Munene | Charity Kamau |

=== Season 1 (2019) ===
Season 1 of The Great Kenyan Bake Off saw twelve home bakers take part in a bake-off to test their baking skills as they battled to be crowned The Great Kenyan Bake Off's best amateur baker. Each week saw the bakers put through two challenges in a particular discipline.

=== Season 2 (2020) ===
Season 2 of The Great Kenyan Bake Off saw twelve home bakers take part in a bake-off to test their baking skills as they battled to be crowned The Great Kenyan Bake Off's best amateur baker. Each week saw the bakers put through two challenges in a particular discipline.
