= The Great British Bake Off: Second Helpings =

- Presented by: Jon Richardson; Judi Love
- Country of origin: United Kingdom
- Original language: English
- No. of series: 1
- No. of episodes: 9

Production
- Production location: The London Studios
- Running time: 45 minutes
- Production company: Love Productions

Original release
- Network: Channel 4
- Release: 22 September 2026 – present

Related
- The Great British Bake Off; The Great British Bake Off: An Extra Slice; Junior Bake Off

The Great British Bake Off: Second Helpings is a British television after-show to follow the series The Great British Bake Off. Hosted by Jon Richardson and Judi Love, the show features guests panellists discussing the after-events of the week.

The show began airing on Channel 4 on 22 September 2026 the same day after the premiere episode of the seventeenth series of the main show, and is filmed at The London Studios.

== Format ==
Richardson and Love and one other guest appear on each episode. The panel has also featured current bakers who have eliminated from the episode that aired previously.

== History ==
The after show was announced in September 2026 with Jon Richardson and Judi Love was later announced as the host of the series on 3 September 2026.

== Transmissions ==
Series	Start date	End date	Episodes
1	22 September 2026	24 November 2026	10
