= The Great British Bake Off: An Extra Slice =

- Presented by: Jo Brand
- Starring: Tom Allen
- Country of origin: United Kingdom
- Original language: English
- No. of series: 12
- No. of episodes: 120

Production
- Production locations: The London Studios (2014–2018); Television Centre (2018–2025)
- Running time: 30 minutes (2014–2017); 45 minutes (2018–2025); 40 minutes (Comic Relief special)
- Production company: Love Productions

Original release
- Network: BBC Two (2014–2016); Channel 4 (2017–2025)
- Release: 8 August 2014 – 7 November 2025

Related
- The Great British Bake Off

The Great British Bake Off: An Extra Slice (sometimes shortened to An Extra Slice) is a British television after-show to follow the series The Great British Bake Off. Hosted by Jo Brand, the show features three celebrity panelists discussing the after-events of the week.

Originally, the show began airing on BBC Two on 8 August 2014 two days after the premiere episode of the fifth series of the main show, and was filmed at The London Studios. In April 2017, it was announced that the series and Brand would follow The Great British Bake Off to Channel 4 in 2017. The sixth series of The Great British Bake Off: An Extra Slice returned on 30 August 2019 and concluded on 1 November 2019. The eighth series began airing on 24 September and concluded on 26 November 2021. In 2024, The Great British Bake Off: An Extra Slice was renewed for a twelfth series that began airing on 5 September 2025.

In September 2026 it was announced that The Great British Bake Off: An Extra Slice would not return. It was replaced by new after show The Great British Bake Off: Second Helpings.

== History ==
The after show was announced in July 2014. Comedian Jo Brand was later announced as the host of the series on 24 July 2014. The show returned for a second run, beginning on 7 August 2015, and for a third series on 24 August 2016. A fourth series began on 31 August 2017 on Channel 4. A fifth series began on 31 August 2018, moving to Friday evenings. In 2023, the show moved to Thursday evenings.

== Format ==
Brand and three rotating panelists appear on each episode. The panelists are generally a chef or cooking expert, such as Michel Roux Jr. or Rosemary Shrager, a comedian such as Hal Cruttenden, and a well-known figure who is a fan of the show. The panel has also featured past bakers, including winners Nancy Birtwhistle and Nadiya Hussain. A typical episode begins with Brand reviewing the events of the previous episode while showing clips, including unseen footage from the tent, usually humorous outtakes. Afterwards, she interviews the panelists about the current episode and what happened in the tent that week. In the next segment, she presents images of bakes viewers have sent in, then talks about the bakes the audience have brought to the studio, at least one of which the panelists try. In the final segment, the most recently eliminated baker joins the panel and is interviewed again by Brand. In the earlier series, the baker is invited to bring one of their "less-successful bakes" which Brand and the panel sample, but this was eliminated in 2020 (most likely to follow COVID-19 regulations). The segment concludes with the baker being presented a cake that captures their time in the tent. Brand concludes the show by showing a preview of what will happen in the next episode of the main show.

== Panelists ==
While on the BBC, the celebrity panel typically (though not always) consisted of a professional baker/chef, a celebrity who is a fan of the show, and a comedian. In the final episode of each series judges Paul Hollywood and Mary Berry normally made an appearance on the panel, along with a comedian. However, since the fourth series (tied to the 8th series of the main show), Prue Leith and Hollywood have appeared on episodes throughout the series. In the Channel 4 version of the show, the panel consists of two comedians and an actor or other fan. In 2018, Tom Allen joined the series as a regular contributor, reviewing audience members' bakes. Sarah Millican hosted one edition of the second series in 2015, as regular host Jo Brand was unavailable.

== Transmissions ==
Series	Start date	End date	Episodes	Timeslot	Channel
1	8 August 2014	8 October 2014	10	Friday 9:00 pm	BBC Two
2	7 August 2015	9 October 2015	10	Friday 9:00 pm	BBC Two
3	26 August 2016	28 October 2016	10	Friday 9:00 pm	BBC Two
4	31 August 2017	2 November 2017	10	Thursday 10:00 pm	Channel 4
5	31 August 2018	2 November 2018	10	Friday 8:00 pm	Channel 4
6	30 August 2019	1 November 2019	10	Friday 8:00 pm	Channel 4
7	25 September 2020	27 November 2020	10	Friday 8:00 pm	Channel 4
8	24 September 2021	26 November 2021	10	Friday 8:00 pm	Channel 4
9	16 September 2022	18 November 2022	10	Friday 8:00 pm	Channel 4
10	28 September 2023	30 November 2023	10	Thursday 8:00 pm	Channel 4
11	26 September 2024	28 November 2024	10	Thursday 8:00 pm	Channel 4
12	5 September 2025	7 November 2025	10	Friday 8:00 pm	Channel 4
