= Choux =

Commune in Bourgogne-Franche-Comté, France

- Commune
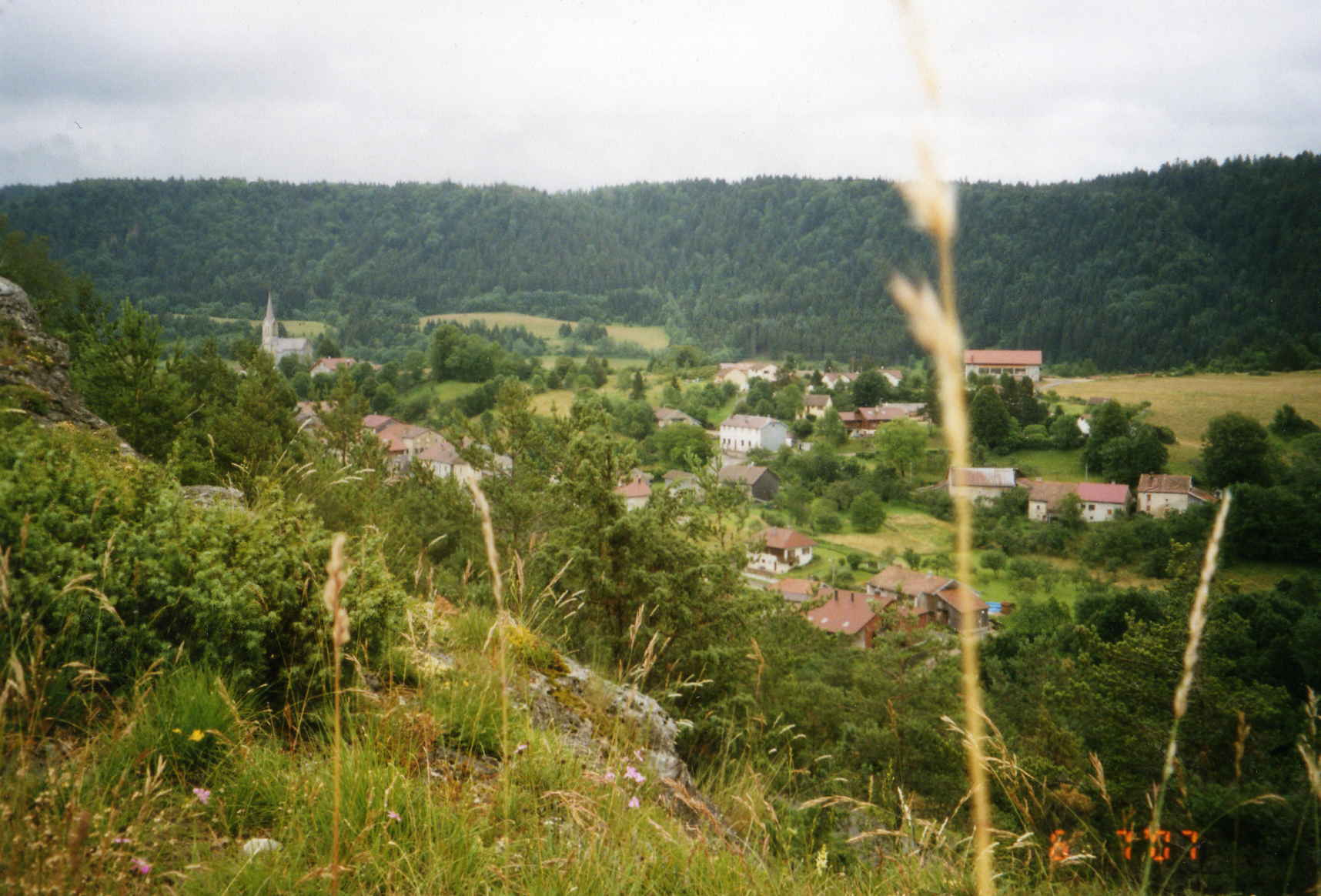
- A general view of Choux
- Location of Choux
- Location within France Location within Bourgogne-Franche-Comté
- Coordinates: 46°18′21″N 5°46′09″E
- Country: France
- Region: Bourgogne-Franche-Comté
- Department: Jura
- Arrondissement: Saint-Claude
- Canton: Coteaux du Lizon

Government
  - Mayor (2020–2026): Josette Piers
- Area^{1}: 8.27 km^{2} (3.19 sq mi)
- Highest elevation: 1,020 m (3,350 ft)
- Lowest elevation: 580 m (1,900 ft)
- Population (2023): 139
  - Density: 16.8/km^{2} (43.5/sq mi)
- Time zone: UTC+01:00 (CET)
  - Summer (DST): UTC+02:00 (CEST)
- INSEE/Postal code: 39151 /39370
- ^{1} French Land Register data, which excludes lakes, ponds, glaciers > 1 km^{2} (0.386 sq mi or 247 acres) and river estuaries.

Choux is a commune in the Jura department in Bourgogne-Franche-Comté in eastern France.

== Population ==
Historical population
Year	Pop.	±% p.a.
1968	121	—
1975	90	−4.14%
1982	81	−1.49%
1990	135	+6.59%
1999	118	−1.48%
2007	143	+2.43%
2012	120	−3.45%
2017	119	−0.17%
2023	139	+2.62%
Source: INSEE

== See also ==
- Communes of the Jura department
