= Kiran Jethwa =

Kenyan chef (born 1976)

Kiran Jethwa born August 22, 1976, in Nairobi, is a Kenyan-born celebrity chef, restaurateur, and entrepreneur. He is the host and presenter of the TV show, Tales From The Bush Larder which focuses on the culinary culture of Africa. Since 2016, Jethwa has co-presented Food Unwrapped on Channel 4.

== Early life ==
Jethwa's father, Batuk, is of Hindu Indian (Gujarati) ethnic origin, while his mother, Clare, has British ancestry. Having lived most of his life in Kenya, he completed his education in Manchester, United Kingdom in the arena of hospitality management. Following the completion of his education, he travelled globally in Europe, the USA, Africa, Southeast Asia, South & Central America, and Australia for further experience.

== Career ==
Jethwa's cooking influences include African, European, and Indian, and has been described as Afro-Mediterranean fusion with an Indian influence.

Jethwa is the producer, presenter, and host of the award-winning cooking series, Tales from the Bush Larder, and also started a new show Fearless Chef.

Since 2011, Jethwa has also been the chef and owner of Seven Restaurants, a premier Nairobi restaurant company. Since 2016, he has co-presented Food Unwrapped on Channel 4 alongside Jimmy Doherty, Kate Quilton, and Matt Tebbutt.

Jethwa is one of the judges on The Great Kenyan Bake Off, the Kenyan version of The Great British Bake Off on KTN Home. The first season was broadcast weekly from 7 October 2019 onwards; it was then renewed for a second season that will be airing from 12 October 2020 onwards.

Since 2022, Jethwa has been the host of Chefs vs. Wild on Hulu.

== Awards ==
Tales from the Bush Larder, series 2 received the "Best T.V Show" award at the 2014 Kenyan Kalasha Awards.

Other awards:

- 2012: Finalist for Taste Chef of The Year
- 2013: Finalist Taste Chef of the Year
- 2013: Winner Taste Industry Champion
- 2013: Chefs Delight: Most Innovative Chef
