= Ruby Tandoh =

British baker

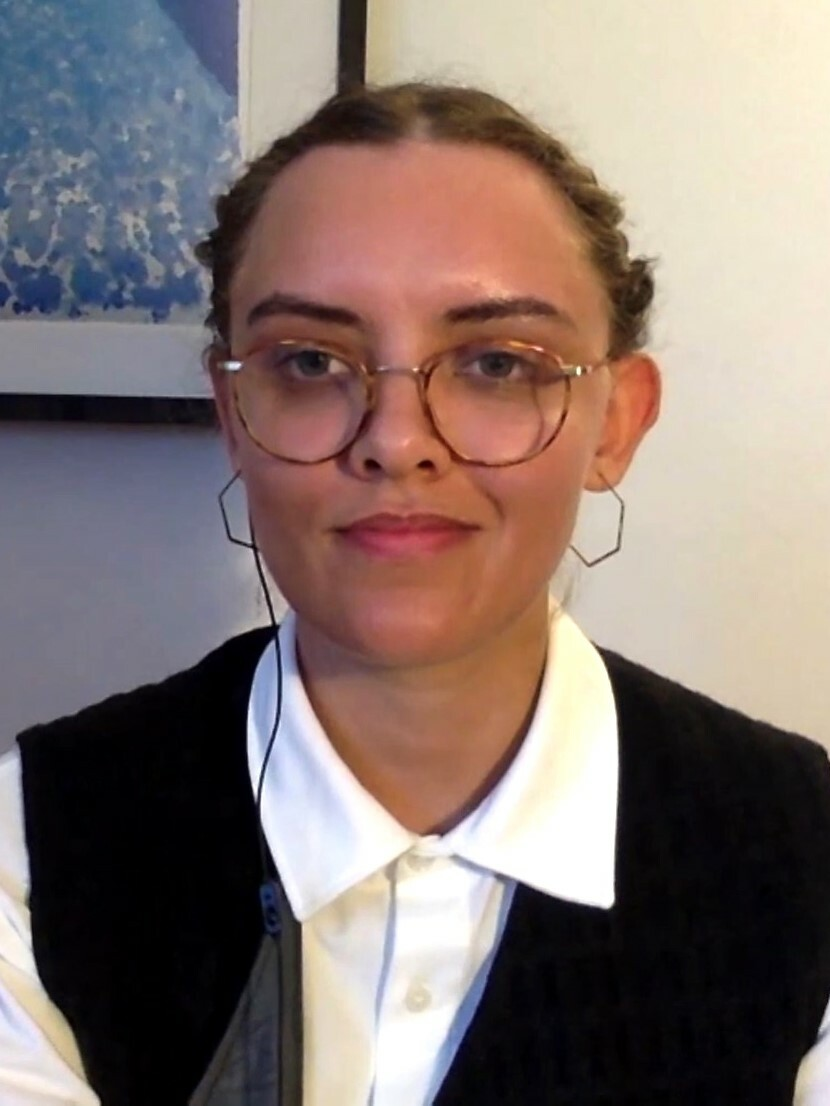
- Tandoh in 2020
- Born: Ruby Alice Tandoh; 1992 (age 33–34); Southend-on-Sea, Essex, England
- Occupations: Television personality; baker; newspaper columnist; author; model
- Years active: 2013–present
- Employers: BBC; ITV
- Television: The Great British Bake Off
- Spouse: Leah Pritchard (m. 2018)

Ruby Alice Tandoh (born 1992) is a British baker, columnist, author, and former model. She was runner-up on series four of BBC's The Great British Bake Off in 2013 and has written four cookbooks. Her 2021 Cook as You Are was named to several best-of lists. Her online debates with many in the UK food world have also drawn attention.

== Early life ==
Tandoh grew up in Southend-on-Sea, as the eldest of four siblings. Her father worked for the Royal Mail and her mother was a school administrator. Her paternal grandfather came from Ghana. To save money feeding a large family, they usually cooked from the vegetarian Moosewood Cookbook.

Tandoh had an eating disorder as a teenager, which she describes as "akin to bulimia, with some binge-eating and anorexia on the side". For a while she was vegan – though she emphasises that being vegan is not an eating disorder for everyone, she says that for her it was. Three years of this disorder led to a suicide attempt at the age of eighteen. She was admitted to a mental health ward but released after one day because she had good grades and "beautiful hair". The eating disorder continued for a total of six years, including throughout her university studies, and her Great British Bake Off appearance.

Tandoh studied philosophy and history of art at University College London, but left after four years without a degree.

== The Great British Bake Off ==
Tandoh competed in the fourth series (2013) of The Great British Bake Off (GBBO) at age twenty, making her the youngest competitor in the series at the time. She reached the all-women final, with Kimberley Wilson and Frances Quinn.

Before the final episode, Tandoh was considered the favourite to win by London bookmakers. However, she attracted noticeable antipathy among some viewers, especially online. These critics claimed that she got into the final by crying; or that she and judge Paul Hollywood were personally attracted to each other (enough that Hollywood had to make a statement that he thought Wilson prettier); or that she was too self-deprecating; or even that she hit back at her critics (calling one Twitter poster a "bitter old witch"). Sarah Ditum addressed most of these accusations in a defence of Tandoh in The Guardian.

Tandoh was one of the runners-up to Quinn, who made a three-tier wedding cake inspired by A Midsummer Night's Dream which the judges said "beat the other two guys hands down". After the conclusion, Tandoh published a much-cited editorial in The Guardian in which she hit back at the criticism that she encountered during the airing of the show, which she said was surprising, personal, and misogynist. For the fifth series (2014) of GBBO, which included the youngest-ever contestant, seventeen-year-old Martha Collison, the BBC specifically warned contestants how to ignore online trolls in response to the unprecedented abuse that Tandoh received.

By 2021, Tandoh said that she could no longer watch the series, despite still appreciating it, and that the theme song made her feel sick.

== Writing career ==
Tandoh has written several books: Crumb: The Baking Book (2014), Flavour: Eat What You Love (2016), Eat Up!: Food, Appetite, Eating What You Want (2018), Cook as You Are (2021), and All Consuming: Why We Eat the Way We Eat Now (2025). Eat Up! explores aspects of food culture, such as eating disorders (which Tandoh suffered from in her teenage years), the wellness craze, food snobbery, and pleasure of food.

Eat Up! addresses culinary culture from a social justice point of view, including the colonialist origins of tea, the classism associated with sugar, and food-associated body shaming. It also covered the dangers of exclusion diets and eating disorders, encouraging the unconditional enjoyment of food. It met positive reviews from Kirkus Reviews, which called it "engrossing", and a mixed one from i newspaper, which questioned its preferring tinned ingredients to raw ones. Eat Up! was a top ten Sunday Times bestseller in 2018.

Tandoh wrote for The Guardian, but announced in June 2018 that she would stop, citing the "elitist" nature of the industry. By March the following year she was again writing occasional articles for the paper.

Along with her wife, Leah Pritchard, Tandoh published the one-off mental health zine Do What You Want in 2017. All profits from the zine go to charities and non-profits.

Eater said that Cook as You Are "is an exercise in creating room for every kind of recipe and every kind of cook", noting the lack of any photography. Tandoh explained the decision to exclude photographs of food and kitchens as intentional, meant to encourage home cooks to assess their success at creating dinner "not by whether it matches up with a photo of a meal staged by a food stylist for a cookbook photo shoot". The Atlanta Journal-Constitution describes the book as "focus[ing] on flexible, mostly low-effort, daily cooking, with charming illustrations of various down-to-earth home settings". Publishers Weekly wrote, "For those seeking a no-fuss guide to feeding loved ones and themselves, this is a winner." The book was named to several best-of lists.

== Public conflicts and criticism ==
Tandoh's online criticisms of and conflicts with fellow chefs, often via Twitter, have drawn extensive news coverage.

Prior to the airing of the Great British Bake Off 2013 finale, chef Raymond Blanc tweeted that Tandoh was the presumed winner and her emotionality and thinness made him doubt her love for cooking or baking. Tandoh responded, calling Blanc an idiot.

During Tandoh's stint on Great British Bake Off, comments had been made that she flirted with Paul Hollywood to gain favour. After coming out in 2015, Tandoh responded to these accusations with a statement on Twitter. In 2016, she made insulting comments about Hollywood when he announced that he was moving with GBBO—but without Mary Berry—from BBC to Channel 4, implying he was primarily interested in the money.

In January 2017, Tandoh referred to wellness bloggers, and specifically food writer Ella Mills, as "dangerous". In April 2017, she refused an offer to appear on Good Morning Britain, referring to host Piers Morgan as a "sentient ham". In a series of tweets later in April 2017, Tandoh criticised multiple celebrity chefs including Jamie Oliver, Lorraine Pascale, the Hairy Bikers, and Tom Kerridge, for what she called elitism, selfishness, and fatphobia. In May of that year, Tandoh criticised chefs Nigella Lawson, Kerridge, and Anthony Bourdain for supporting boring and privileged cooking. In June, Tandoh jointly and separately criticised chefs Oliver, Nigel Slater, Lawson, the Hairy Bikers, and Hollywood for not speaking up before the 2017 United Kingdom general election. In August she further criticised Hollywood for blocking her on Twitter.

In 2018, Tandoh criticised former Made in Chelsea reality show contestant Lucy Watson, who had released a vegan cookbook in 2017, for tweeting that "most people" should be vegan. Tandoh listed reasons why people might not be able to be vegan, and said that Watson was writing from a position of social privilege. Watson replied by accusing Tandoh of taking offence because her own cookbook contained meat and dairy recipes. An editorial by Ella Griffiths in The Independent supported Tandoh.

In 2020, Tandoh joined a chorus of voices criticising the Horizon episode about "The Restaurant That Burns Off Calories", first tweeting, then writing in The Guardian, that it would encourage fat-shaming and disordered eating. Host Fred Sirieix replied by sarcastically thanking her for drawing attention to the episode.

== Personal life ==
Tandoh has said that she accepted being queer soon after she came to terms with her relationship to food. She wrote in Eat Up! that before then she had denied herself both food and meaningful relationships.

Tandoh came out in a Twitter post in 2015, linking to the Diana Ross song "I'm Coming Out". This drew extensive media attention, much of it reporting that she had announced she was gay.

In a 2018 interview with The Times, Tandoh identified herself as bisexual, saying that she had previously had boyfriends.

Tandoh had been encouraged to come out by her then girlfriend, Leah Pritchard, a musician training to be a psychotherapist. She later said that she felt fortunate to have met Pritchard shortly after accepting her bisexuality. They met on Tinder and announced their relationship soon after Tandoh's coming-out post. They lived in Sheffield, where they married in a low-key ceremony on 31 August 2018.

In 2025, The Times reported that Tandoh was living with a partner whose identity she preferred to keep private.

Tandoh has spoken out about her struggles with eating disorders, criticising the body shaming common in "wellness" culture and advocating a healthier, more positive approach to food writing. She was voted the Great British Bake Off's favourite past contestant by the Radio Times audience in 2016.

== Bibliography ==
- Crumb: The Baking Book (2014), ISBN 0701189312
- Flavour: Eat What You Love (2016), ISBN 0701189320
- Eat Up!: Food, Appetite and Eating What You Want (2018), ISBN 1781259593
- Cook as You Are (2021), ISBN 978-0593321546
- All Consuming. Random House. 9 September 2025. ISBN 979-8-217-20786-2.
