= The Great British Baking Show season 2 =

The second season of The Great British Baking Show, the American title for The Great British Bake Off, refers to:

- The Great British Bake Off series 2 (2011)
- The Great British Bake Off series 4 (2013), broadcast as the second season on PBS in the United States

== See also ==
- The Great British Baking Show season 1
- The Great British Baking Show season 3
- The Great British Baking Show season 4
- The Great British Baking Show season 5
