= Estelle White =

British composer

Elizabeth Estelle White (4 December 1925 – 9 February 2011) was a British composer who wrote over 160 hymns, several Masses, and music for theatre. White grew up in a musical family on Tyneside, where she learned to play the piano, guitar, clarinet and tenor saxophone. Her musical influences included Duke Ellington, Count Basie, and musical theatre. White's first works were composed during her years as a Carmelite nun; some were published or copyrighted under the name Sister Estelle, though most were published under the name Estelle White. She is best remembered for her school assembly favourite, the hymn "Autumn Days".

== World War II ==
White joined the Auxiliary Territorial Service during World War II, when she was 17, and played saxophone with a British army band on many ceremonial occasions, including the 1946 Victory Parade. She also travelled to entertain troops in the Central Mediterranean Force in Palestine and Egypt.

== After World War II ==
After the war, White trained as a physiotherapist at Newcastle on Tyneside, and worked with children who had cerebral palsy. She acted, directed, painted scenery and composed music for productions at the People's Theatre in Newcastle before moving to Ontario, Canada, for 18 months, where she joined the Roman Catholic Church. White returned to England in 1965 and became a nun, taking temporary vows with the Corpus Christi Carmelite Sisters. She trained at Digby Stuart College in Roehampton and qualified to teach theology and music.

== 1970–2011 ==
White left the convent in 1970 and taught in Catholic schools in the north of England until she retired. She also wrote articles for the The Guardian and various women's magazines. During this time, she studied Hebrew and Greek, earning an MA with Distinction from Leeds University in 1989. She directed the church choir at St Josephs, Dewsbury, from 1984 until 1991.

White's hymn for harvest festival, "Autumn Days", is included in Come and Praise. The hymn caused controversy in 1996, when choir members of the 12th-century St. Mary's Church in Wroxham, Norfolk, walked out rather than sing the hymn. They found the reference to "jet planes meeting in air to be refuelled," to be inappropriate. White explained that she had written the hymn for the children at a school under a flight path to sing.

Many of White's compositions were published by McCrimmon Publishing Company.

== Hymns ==
- “And He Listens with His Hands”
- “As Bread My Lord Comes to Me”
- “Autumn Days”
- “Breath of God O Holy Spirit”
- “'Cheep' Said the Sparrow on the Chimney Top”
- “Christ is Our King”
- “Come to the North”
- “Deep Calls to Deep”
- “Gentle as Silence/Oh the Love of My Lord is the Essence”
- “Give Me Peace O Lord I Pray”
- “Grace”
- “Harvey”
- “He Came to Open the Eyes of the Blind”
- “He is the Light of the World”
- “I Can See Across the Square”
- “I Give My Hands”
- “I Love the Warmth of the Sun”
- “I Saw the Grass I Saw the Trees”
- “In the Earth the Small Seed”
- “In the Love of God and Neighbor”
- “It is the Living Spirit”
- “January Brings the Snow”
- “Like a Sea Without a Shore”
- “Little Boy Don't Delay”
- “Lonely Hills, Tarn and Fell”
- “Melissa Comes Into the Ward”
- “Moses I Know You're the Man”
- “Of One That is So Fair and Bright”
- “Oh the Love of My Lord is the Essence/Gentle as Silence”
- “O my Lord Within My Heart”
- “Our Father”
- “People of God”
- “Perfect Face”
- “Put Your Trust in the Man Who Tamed the Sea”
- “Take the Other Way My Brother”
- “There is a World”
- “They Were Beating as He Dragged Himself”
- “Trust is in the Eyes of a Tiny Babe”
- “Walk With Me O My Lord”
- “When I was a Child I Walked in the Sunlight”
- “You Can't Climb a River”

== Masses ==
- Mass for Our Time
- Mass for Young People
- Mass of the Spirit

== See also ==
- Estelle White (1925-2011): An Introduction to Her Life and Hymns by Veronica Whitty
- Hear "Gentle as Silence" by Estelle White
