= Valerie Collison =

English organist and composer

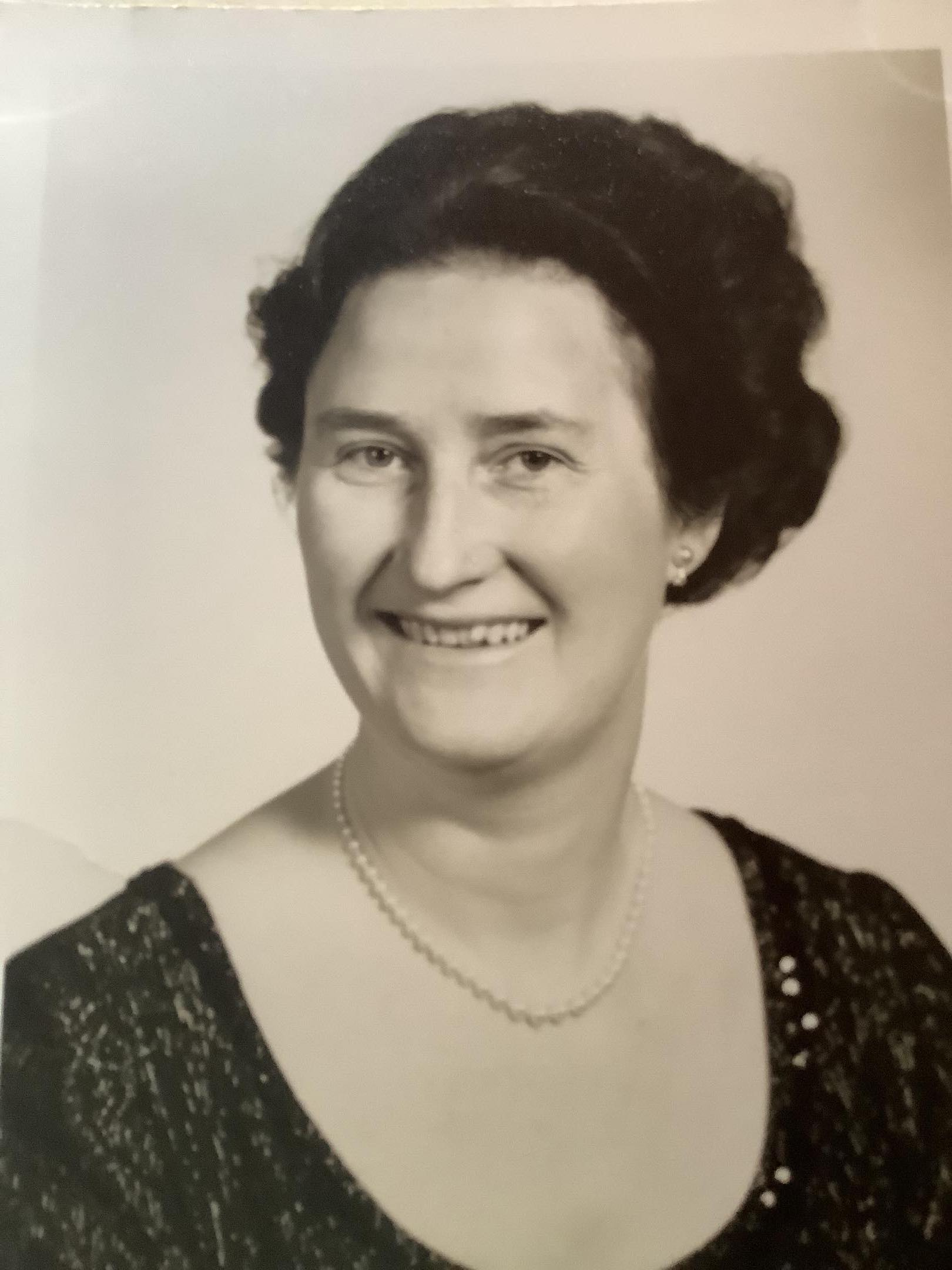
Valerie Collison in 1972

Valerie Collison (born 23 March 1933) is an English organist and composer of hymns and carols. Her best-known work is "Come and Join the Celebration" for which she composed both the lyrics and tune. This was first published in Carols for Children in 1972 and is now performed in services throughout the UK. She also wrote "The Journey of Life", popular in English primary schools as part of the Come and Praise hymnal. She was born in Bromley and worked as a medical secretary.

Her granddaughter, Martha Collison, is a British baker and food columnist. She rose to fame after competing as The Great British Bake Off's youngest ever contestant.
