= Beca Lyne-Pirkis =

Welsh chef and television personality

- Born: Rebecca Frances Lyne-Pirkis; 28 September 1981 (age 45); Cardiff
- Education: Cardiff University; Royal Welsh College of Music and Drama; Cardiff Metropolitan University
- Spouse: Matthew Lyne-Pirkis
- Culinary career
- Cooking style: Welsh cuisine

Rebecca Frances Lyne-Pirkis (born 28 September 1981), better known as Beca Lyne-Pirkis, is a Welsh cook, food writer and TV presenter. She is best known for her cookery show Becws on S4C. She came to prominence as a contestant on The Great British Bake Off series 4 in 2013, where she made the Welsh speciality bara brith.

After losing in the competition, Lyne-Pirkis revealed that she had found some of judge Paul Hollywood's comments upsetting. However, she agreed that the judges had to be firm and said that the experience had made her stronger.

In 2014 she was given her own show by S4C, based on her own family's experiences of cookery and their favourite recipes. The Welsh language cookery show, titled Becws, started airing on S4C on 11 September 2014. Later, she hosted Parti Bwyd Beca, which ran for two series, and was appointed to the Welsh Food Advisory Committee.

Lyne-Pirkis and her family live in Surrey, and she has worked as a chef at Borough Market in London and at a cookery school in Derbyshire. She has been a presenter at the Good Food Festival in Birmingham and at the Amgueddfa Cymru Food Festival in Cardiff.

In 2022, after studying to become a dietician in the NHS, she returned to S4C as a food expert on the series FFIT Cymru, replacing Sioned Quirke. On the programme, she created special recipes and shared her experience as a working mother. She also appeared as a chef in the Great British Food Festival event, showcasing traditional Welsh recipes.
