= The Great British Baking Show season 5 =

The fifth season of The Great British Baking Show, the American title for The Great British Bake Off, refers to:

- The Great British Bake Off series 3 (2012), broadcast as the fifth season of the series on PBS in the United States
- The Great British Bake Off series 5 (2014), broadcast as the first season of the series on PBS in the United States

== See also ==
- The Great British Baking Show season 1
- The Great British Baking Show season 2
- The Great British Baking Show season 3
- The Great British Baking Show season 4
