= The Great British Baking Show season 1 =

The first season of The Great British Baking Show, the American title for The Great British Bake Off, refers to:

- The Great British Bake Off series 1 (2010)
- The Great British Bake Off series 5 (2014), which was initially broadcast as the first season on PBS in the United States

== See also ==
- The Great British Baking Show season 2
- The Great British Baking Show season 3
- The Great British Baking Show season 4
- The Great British Baking Show season 5
