= The Great British Baking Show season 4 =

The fourth season of The Great British Baking Show, the American title for The Great British Bake Off, refers to:

- The Great British Bake Off series 4 (2013), broadcast initially as the second season of the series on PBS in the United States
- The Great British Bake Off series 7 (2016), broadcast initially as the fourth season of the series on PBS in the United States

== See also ==
- The Great British Baking Show season 1
- The Great British Baking Show season 2
- The Great British Baking Show season 3
- The Great British Baking Show season 5
