= The Great British Bake Off series 4 =

Fourth series of The Great British Bake Off

The Great British Bake Off
- Series 4
- Presented by: Mel Giedroyc; Sue Perkins
- Judges: Mary Berry; Paul Hollywood
- No. of contestants: 13
- Winner: Frances Quinn
- Runners-up: Kimberley Wilson; Ruby Tandoh
- Location: Harptree Court (East Harptree, Somerset)
- No. of max. bakes: 30
- No. of episodes: 10

Release
- Original network: BBC Two
- Original release: 20 August – 22 October 2013

Series chronology
- ← Previous; Series 3 Next → Series 5

The fourth series of The Great British Bake Off began airing on 20 August 2013. Mel Giedroyc and Sue Perkins again presented the show and Mary Berry and Paul Hollywood returned as judges. As with series three, the competition was held at Harptree Court in East Harptree, Somerset.

13,000 amateur bakers applied to appear on the programme, and 100 were selected for screen test, with the best 60 advancing to a three-day audition. From these, 13 contestants were chosen this year so the judges could eliminate two people whenever they wanted.

The winner of the Great British Bake Off 2013 was Frances Quinn.

The fourth series was broadcast as the second season on PBS in the United States.

== Bakers ==
Baker	Age	Occupation	Hometown	Links
Ali Imdad	25	Charity worker	Saltley, Birmingham	
Beca Lyne-Pirkis (Note: Originally from Cardiff, Wales.)	31	Military Wives' Choir Singer	Aldershot, Hampshire	
Christine Wallace	66	Director of an engraving company	Didcot, Oxfordshire	
Deborah Manger	51	Dentist	Peterborough	
Frances Quinn	31	Children's Clothes Designer	Market Harborough, Leicestershire	
Glenn Cosby	37	English Teacher	Teignmouth, Devon	
Howard Middleton	51	Council Worker	Sheffield	
Kimberley Wilson	30	Psychologist	London	
Lucy Bellamy	38	Horticulturist	Grimsby, Lincolnshire	
Mark Onley	37	Carpenter and Kitchen Fitter	Milton Keynes	
Robert Smart	54	Space Satellite Designer	Melbourn, Cambridgeshire	
Ruby Tandoh	20	History of Art and Philosophy Student	Southend, Essex	
Toby Waterworth	30	Web Programmer	Reading, Berkshire	

== Results summary ==
Elimination chart
Baker	1	2	3	4	5	6	7	8	9	10
Frances	HIGH	SAFE	HIGH	SAFE	SAFE	HIGH	SB	LOW	HIGH	WINNER
Kimberley	SAFE	HIGH	SAFE	SB	LOW	SAFE	SAFE	HIGH	SB	Runner-up
Ruby	LOW	SB	HIGH	HIGH	LOW	SB	SAFE	SB	LOW	Runner-up
Beca	SAFE	LOW	SAFE	SAFE	SAFE	SAFE	HIGH	LOW	OUT	
Christine	SAFE	SAFE	SB	SAFE	SB	SAFE	LOW	OUT		
Glenn	SAFE	SAFE	SAFE	LOW	HIGH	LOW	OUT			
Howard	HIGH	SAFE	LOW	SAFE	SAFE	OUT				
Robert	SB	LOW	SAFE	LOW	OUT					
Ali	LOW	SAFE	SAFE	OUT						
Deborah	SAFE	SAFE	OUT							
Mark	SAFE	LOW	OUT							
Lucy	SAFE	OUT								
Toby	OUT									

Colour key:

Baker got through to the next round
Baker was eliminated
Baker was one of the judges' least favourite bakers that week, but was not eliminated.
Baker was the Star Baker
Baker was one of the judges' favourite bakers that week, but did not win star baker.
Baker was a series runner-up
Baker was the series winner

== Episodes ==
Colour key:

Baker was eliminated at conclusion of episode
Baker was named "Star Baker" at conclusion of episode
Baker was named runner-up for the series
Baker won series

=== Episode 1: Cakes ===
The bakers were given 2 hours to make a sandwich cake with filling of their choice for the signature challenge. For their first technical challenge, the bakers were required to bake an angel food cake using Mary Berry's recipe in 2 1/2 hours. For the showstopper, the challenge was to make a chocolate cake using at least two types of chocolate to decorate the cake. They were given 4 hours for this bake.

Baker	Signature (Sandwich Cake)	Technical (Angel Food Cake)	Showstopper (Chocolate Cake)	Result
Ali	Rose and Pistachio Cake	11th	Chocolate, Raspberry and Passion Fruit Engagement Cake	Safe
Beca	Grapefruit Sandwich Cake	8th	Chocolate Cherry Indulgence	Safe
Christine	Strawberry, Vanilla and Rosewater Summer Basket	3rd	Chocolate and Orange 'Fripperous' Hat Cake	Safe
Deborah	Pineapple Cake	9th	'Coffee Time'	Safe
Frances	Giant Jam Sandwich	7th	Secret Squirrel Cake	Safe
Glenn	Strawberries and Cream Cake	4th	Almond and Espresso Chocolate Cake	Safe
Howard	Passion Fruit and Coconut Cake	6th	Black Forest Revisited	Safe
Kimberley	Blood Orange Cake	10th	Chocolate, Raspberry & Basil Layer Cake	Safe
Lucy	Timperley Early Cake	2nd	Thyme 'Wildwood' Cake	Safe
Mark	Lemon and Poppy Seed Cake	5th	Chocolate Monster	Safe
Robert	Pecan and Apple Cake	1st	Raspberry Chocolate Cake	Star Baker
Ruby	Rhubarb and Custard Sandwich Cake	12th	Chocolate and Ginger Night Sky Cake	Safe
Toby	Spiced and Iced Carrot Cake	13th	Two Tiered Chocolate Cake	Eliminated

=== Episode 2: Bread ===
The bakers were asked to make, in 2 hours, 36 breadsticks, all made using yeast, of at least 25 cm (9.8 in) in length, and the breadsticks should be crisp and produce a good snap. For the technical challenge, the bakers have to make 8 English muffins using Paul's recipe in 2 3/4 hours. For the final bake, an elaborately decorated loaf was set as the showstopper challenge to be completed in 4 hours.

Baker	Signature (36 Bread Sticks)	Technical (8 English Muffins)	Showstopper (Decorative Loaf)	Result
Ali	Italian Grissini	9th	Sweet and Savoury Yin Yang Bread	Safe
Beca	Fennel and Chilli Breadsticks	11th	Five Strand Christmas Wreath	Safe
Christine	Mediterranean Breadsticks with Oregano	4th	Double Plaited Loaf	Safe
Deborah	Fennel & Chili Breadsticks	8th	Walnut Fleur Loaf	Safe
Frances	Giant Matchsticks	2nd	Sailor's Knot	Safe
Glenn	Rosemary and Parmesan Grissini	7th	Harvest Crown	Safe
Howard	Moroccan Breadsticks	10th	Picasso Sun Bread	Safe
Kimberley	Nigella Seed and Parmesan Breadsticks	1st	Peace Bread	Safe
Lucy	Grissini with Salt	12th	Roasted Tomato Bread	Eliminated
Mark	Rosemary & Raisin Breadsticks	6th	Sage & Garlic Plait	Safe
Robert	Twisty Rye Bread Sticks	5th	Tribute Loaf	Safe
Ruby	Mexican Breadsticks	3rd	White Chocolate and Orange Peacock Bread	Star Baker

=== Episode 3: Desserts ===
For their signature challenge, the bakers were asked to make a trifle of their own choice, using ladyfingers, sponge or biscuit for the base and either jam or custard for the middle layer, to be done in 3 hours. For their technical challenge, the bakers were required to prepare, in 1 1/2 hours, 6 floating islands using Mary Berry's recipe. For the show-stopper, the bakers were set the task of making 24 petit fours, 12 biscuit based, and 12 sponge based, to be finished in 3 hours.

Baker	Signature (Trifle)	Technical (6 Floating Islands)	Showstopper (24 Petit Fours: 12 Biscuit-based, 12 Sponge-based)	Result
Ali	Coconut, Raspberry and Lemon Meringue Trifle	5th	Vanilla Latte Mini Cakes; Lime & Mint Shortbread Pops	Safe
Beca	Orange and Ginger Trifle	10th	Limoncello and Blueberry Bursts; Millionaire Shortbread	Safe
Christine	Caribbean Pina Colada Trifle	4th	Ninety Niners; Sachertorte Parcels	Star Baker
Deborah	Tropical Trifle^{A}	9th	Canelé Cherry and Chocolate Cakes; Rose Cookies	Eliminated
Frances	Apple and Blackberry Crumble Trifle	8th	'Ballet Bites' Ginger Nutcrackers; Sugar Plum Fairy Cakes	Safe
Glenn	Raspberry and Almond Trifle	1st	Billionaire Bouchées; Orange Financiers	Safe
Howard	Caramel and Apple Trifle^{A}	7th	Black Coffee and Cardamom Cakes; White Stilton and Pear Biscuits	Safe
Kimberley	Peach, Almond and Ginger Trifle	6th	Chocolate Pistachio Financiers; Lemon Bergamot Biscuits	Safe
Mark	Ginger, Mango and Passion Fruit Trifle	11th	Rose and Pistachio Macarons; Chocolate and Raspberry Bites	Eliminated
Robert	Rhubarb and Orange Trifle	2nd	Almond Friands; Turón Macarons	Safe
Ruby	Desert Island Trifle	3rd	Lemon Shortbread and White Chocolate Seashells; Blackberry and Chocolate Layer Cakes	Safe

^A In this challenge, Deborah accidentally used Howard's custard. As a result, Howard used Deborah's custard in his trifle. This switch was revealed to Paul and Mary, who appropriately judged their custards separately in their respective trifles. The incident was dubbed Custardgate by the press.

=== Episode 4: Pies and Tarts ===
For the signature challenge the bakers are asked to bake a double-crusted fruit pie with a filling of their choice to be done in 2 hours. For their technical challenge, the bakers were required to bake a tart that has almost a 700-year history; the egg custard tart, that needs to be done in 2 hours. For the showstopper, the challenge was to make a filo pie centerpiece using the filo pastry that they had made from scratch to be done in 4 hours.

Baker	Signature (Double-Crusted Fruit Pie)	Technical (12 Egg Custard Tarts)	Showstopper (Filo Pie)	Result
Ali	Apple and Ginger Pie with a Pecan and Walnut Shortcrust Pastry	8th	Orange, Cardamom and Date M'Hanncha	Eliminated
Beca	Mamgu's Cherry-Apple Tart	2nd	Moroccan Vegetable Filo Feast	Safe
Christine	Granny Rogers' Apple, Plum & Cinnamon Country Pie	7th	Roasted Vegetable Filo Pie with Feta Cheese	Safe
Frances	Peach Pie In the Sky	1st	Cherry Tree Baklava Filo Pie	Safe
Glenn	Apple & Maple Syrup Pie	9th	Spanakopita	Safe
Howard	Apple Pie with Sage Pastry	5th	Fresh Fig and Feta Filo Flan	Safe
Kimberley	Pecan and Rosemary Caramel Apple Pie	4th	Chicken, Bacon and Butternut Squash Pie	Star Baker
Robert	Apple and Pear Pie with Thyme	3rd	Spanakopita with St George's Mushrooms	Safe
Ruby	Apple and Marzipan Pie	6th	Rose, Almond and Raspberry Filo Pie	Safe

=== Episode 5: Biscuits and Traybakes ===
For the signature challenge, the bakers were asked to make their favourite traybake in 2 hours and cut into identical pieces. Everything made as part of the traybake, however, needed to be made from scratch. In the technical challenge, the bakers needed to make 18 tuiles using Mary Berry's recipe in 1 1/2 hours. Half of the tuiles needed to be shaped in the traditional manner and piped in a concentric circle, and the other half rolled up and dipped in chocolate. In the last challenge, the baker had to make a biscuit tower at least 30 cm (12 in) high, to be finished in 4 hours.

Baker	Signature (Traybake)	Technical (18 Tuiles: 9 Original, 9 Dipped in Chocolate)	Showstopper (Biscuit Tower)	Result
Beca	Chocolate, Cherry and Hazelnut Brownies	5th	Tiered Macaron and Sugar Dough Biscuit Centrepiece	Safe
Christine	Mixed Berry and Almond Crumble Traybake	1st	Shortbread Bavarian Clock Tower	Star Baker
Frances	Millionaire Banoffee Bonus	3rd	Biscuit Buttons and Beads (Note: During the Showstopper round, Frances's tower tipped over while Mel was helping her measure it.)	Safe
Glenn	Apricot and Pistachio Tiffin	2nd	Shortbread and Macaron Helter-Skelter	Safe
Howard	Breakfast Traybake	8th	Japanese Pagoda Tea Tower	Safe
Kimberley	Cherry and Almond Bakewell Florentine Slice	7th	Black and White Viennese Biscuit Stack	Safe
Robert	Blueberry & Orange Traybake	4th	Orange and Lemon Biscuit Dalek	Eliminated
Ruby	Blackberry and Lemon Bakewell Slice	6th	'Dropped Ice Cream' Biscuit Centrepiece	Safe

=== Episode 6: Sweet Dough ===
In the first challenge, the bakers were required to make a sweet tea loaf using yeast, either in a tin or free form. They were given 3 hours for the task. For the technical challenge, the bakers baked an apricot couronne using Paul Hollywood's recipe in 2 3/4 hours. For the showstopper, the bakers needed to make 2 different varieties of European sweet buns, 12 of each. The bakers were given 30 minutes to start in the first day, so a dough may be proofed overnight to be finished the following day in 4 hours.

Baker	Signature (Tea Loaf)	Technical (Apricot Couronne)	Showstopper (24 Sweet European Buns)	Result
Beca	Bara Brith	6th	Chocolate and Rum-Soaked Prune Brioches; Cardamom Spiced Lemon Iced Buns	Safe
Christine	Oxford Nutty Fruit Loaf	4th	Schnecken Buns; Vanilla Custard Skolebrød	Safe
Frances	Chai Tea Loaf	2nd	Hot Cross Brioches; Rhubarb and Custard Kolaches	Safe
Glenn	Devonshire Panettone	5th	Almond and Apricot Brioches; Sticky Caramel Kanelbullen	Safe
Howard	Date & Hemp Yorkshire Loaf	7th	Peachy Buns; German Baumschnecken	Eliminated
Kimberley	Chai Spiced Ginger and Date Tea Loaf	3rd	Double Chocolate and Hazelnut Brioches; Danish Kanelsnurrer	Safe
Ruby	Citrus Tea Loaf	1st	Twisted Swedish Kanelbullar; Saffron St. Lucia Buns	Star Baker

=== Episode 7: Pastry ===
The bakers are challenged to bring the old fashioned suet pudding back up to date in 3 hours for the signature challenge. In the technical bake, the bakers are challenged to create 8 perfect religieuse: choux buns topped with ganache and filled with crème patissiere then carefully balanced one on top of the other to be done in 2 hours. In the showstopper challenge, the bakers have 4 hours to make 3 different types of puff pastries: one filled, one iced and one of their choice.

Baker	Signature (Suet Pudding)	Technical (8 Religieuses)	Showstopper (36 sweet puff pastries: 12 Filled, 12 Iced, 12 of Their Own Choice)	Result
Beca	Spring Lamb and Vegetable Suet Pudding with Redcurrant Gravy	1st	Nectarine and Frangipane Squares; Chocolate and Hazelnut Vol-au-vents; Strawberries and Cream Mille-feuille	Safe
Christine	Spotted Dick 'With a Kick' and Vanilla Custard Ice Cream	6th	Eccles Cakes; Fresh Fruit Baskets; Lemon Cream Eton Mess Mille-feuille	Safe
Frances	Figgy Roll-y Poly Pudding with Caramelised Walnut and Honey Ice-Cream	5th	French Framboise Cream Horns; Sheet Music Mille-feuille; Bass Clef Palmiers	Star Baker
Glenn	Prune and Armagnac Pudding with Boozy Butterscotch Sauce	3rd	Caramelised Apple and Marzipan Tartlets; Chocolate Elephant Ears; Passion Fruit Mille-feuille	Eliminated
Kimberley	Barberry and Apple Spotted Dick with Maple Syrup and White Chocolate Custard	4th	Pear, Malt and Butterscotch Mille-feuille; Blackberry and Lemon Verbena Crème Brûlee Custard Tarts; Fig, Orange and Thyme Galette	Safe
Ruby	Plum Jam Roly Poly with Ginger Ice Cream	2nd	Raspberry and Passion Fruit Mille-feuille; Caramelised Apple Lattice; Portuguese Custard Tarts	Safe

=== Episode 8: Alternative Ingredients (Quarterfinals) ===
This week, in the quarter final, the theme for this week were bakes that were free (e.g. gluten free, dairy free). In the signature challenge, the bakers are challenged to bake a loaf that does not use traditional wheat flours, instead they must use flours such as spelt, rye, potato or tapioca, all in 3 hours. The bakers are challenged in the technical bake to make a dacquoise which consists of three layers; coiled meringue, coffee custard and a hazelnut praline top, to be done in 2 3/4 hours. For the showstopper, the bakers are pushed out of their comfort zones and asked to create novelty vegetable cakes which must be dairy free, to be completed in 4 hours.

Baker	Signature (Wheat-Free Loaf)	Technical (Hazelnut Dacquoise)	Showstopper (Dairy-Free Vegetable Cake)	Result
Beca	Potato, Spelt and Rosemary Focaccia	4th	Spiced Butternut Squash and Pecan 'Cheese' Cake	Safe
Christine	Multi-Seeded Loaf with Pumpkin, Sesame and Sunflower Seeds	5th	Sweet Potato Guitar with Passion Fruit Icing and Marshmallow Fondant	Eliminated
Frances	'Chelsea Flour Show' Bun Bouquet	3rd	Hidden Carrot Cake	Safe
Kimberley	Wild Garlic Pesto and Parma Ham Spelt Loaf	2nd	Butternut Squash and Spice Cake Toadstool House	Safe
Ruby	Mango and Nigella Seed Spelt Cob	1st	Carrot Cake and Pistachio Garden Plot	Star Baker

=== Episode 9: French week (Semi-final) ===
This week's theme was all things French. In the signature challenge, the bakers are challenged to make 3 different types of savoury canapés; choux pastry, shortcrust or rough puff pastry, and a third pastry of their choice, to be done in 2 1/2 hours. For the technical bake, the bakers are challenged to make a Charlotte Royale consisting of Swiss roll surrounding a bavarois in 2 1/2 hours. It is set with gelatin to form a firm dome when turned out. In the showstopper challenge, the bakers are challenged to bake an iconic French patisserie, the opera cake, in 2 1/2 hours.

Baker	Signature (36 Canapés- 12 Choux, 12 Shortcrust/Rough Puff, 12 Any of their Choice)	Technical (Charlotte Royale)	Showstopper (Opera Cake)	Result
Beca	Stilton and Walnut Macarons; Beetroot and Salmon Choux Puffs; Welsh Rarebit Tartlets	3rd	Banoffee Opera Cake	Eliminated
Frances	Légume Canapés: Chantenay Carrots; Choux Pastry Tomatoes; Cauliflower Cheese Scones	2nd	Great British Soap Opera Cake	Safe
Kimberley	Pea Purée Tarts; Crab and Wasabi Profiteroles; Steamed Buns with Barbecue Chicken	1st	Passion Fruit and Lime Opera Cake	Star Baker
Ruby	Beetroot Jelly on Poppy Seed Biscuits; Spinach, Parmesan and Egg Tartlets; Choux Buns with Goat's Cheese and Caramelised Onions	4th	Chocolate, Almond Praline and Saffron Opera Cake	Safe

=== Episode 10: Final ===
In the signature challenge, the final three are challenged to create a picnic pie in 3 hours. The pie must be savoury, the fillings have to create a creative design and has to be strong enough to be served out of the tin. For the technical challenge, the bakers are challenged to make 12 perfectly shaped pretzels; 6 savoury with rock salt and 6 sweet, flavoured with poppy seeds and topped with sweet orange zest and glaze, all to be done in 2^{1}/_{2} hours. For the final showstopper challenge of the series, the bakers are asked to bake the ultimate showpiece – a three-tiered wedding cake in 6 hours.

Baker	Signature (Picnic Pie)	Technical (12 Pretzel – 6 Savory, 6 Sweet)	Showstopper (Three-Tiered Wedding Cake)	Result
Frances	Rainbow Picnic Pie	3rd	Midsummer Night's Dream Wedding Cake	Winner
Kimberley	Chicken and Pig Pie	1st	Languages of Love Wedding Cake	Runner-up
Ruby	Picnic Basket Pie	2nd	Raspberry, Lemon and Passion Fruit Wedding Cake	Runner-up

=== Masterclasses ===
Mary and Paul take over the tent and take on the challenges that they set for the bakers, showing what they would have done had they been in the bakers shoes.

==== Episode 1 ====
	Bake 1	Bake 2	Bake 3
Mary	Spiced Whole Orange Cake with Orange Mascarpone Icing	Angel Food Cake with Lemon Curd	Chocolate Creation Showstopper
Paul	Olive Breadsticks	English Muffins	Chocolate Creation Showstopper

==== Episode 2 ====
	Bake 1	Bake 2	Bake 3
Mary	Tipsy Trifle	Floating Islands	Wobbly Apricot Tart
Paul	Egg Custard Tarts	Spanakopita	—N/a

==== Episode 3 ====
	Bake 1	Bake 2	Bake 3
Mary	Ginger and Treacle Spiced Traybake	Tuiles with Chocolate Mousse	—N/a
Paul	Iced Tea Loaf	Apricot Couronne	Brioche Tetes

==== Episode 4 ====
	Bake 1	Bake 2	Bake 3
Mary	Sussex Pond Pudding with Apples	Religieuses	Opera Cake
Paul	Rye Bread	Pretzels	—N/a

==== Christmas Masterclass ====
	Bake 1	Bake 2	Bake 3
Mary	Mincemeat Streusel	Tunis Cake	Gingerbread House
Paul	Stollen	Black Bun	Boxing Day pie

== Controversy ==
Before the series started, there was speculation Paul Hollywood would not appear in the show after his marriage broke down. Mary Berry, however, was claimed to have supported Hollywood over rumours of his possible sacking by BBC; and the BBC denied the rumours and said that his job was safe.

During the series, there were accusations of Paul Hollywood's favouritism towards Ruby Tandoh, and personal attacks on Tandoh by various people including the chef Raymond Blanc. Both Paul Hollywood and Ruby Tandoh denied the accusation.

== Post-show careers ==
Frances Quinn wrote a book, Quinntessential Baking, released on 17 August 2015.

Ruby Tandoh has written three books, Crumb: The Baking Book, published on 25 September 2014, Flavour: Eat What You Love in 2016 and Eat Up: Food, Appetite and Eating What You Want in 2018. She took half a year out from the university after the show, but has returned to complete her philosophy and history of art course at University College London. She wrote a column on baking for The Guardian.

Beca Lyne-Pirkis presented a Welsh language cookery show Becws for S4C starting 11 September 2014. She later participated in the 2017 rendition of The Great Christmas Bake Off.

Glenn Cosby left teaching and launched his own touring stage show Bake It Big in 2014. That same year, Cosby release his book Tasty Travels.

Ali Imdad has set up a bakery business, and become a full-time baker. He later participated in the 2016 rendition of The Great Christmas Bake Off.

Howard Middleton participated in the 2016 rendition of The Great New Year's Bake Off.

== Ratings ==
The show achieved some of the highest ratings seen on BBC Two. According to overnight data, the final episode was seen by 9.1 million viewers at its peak, and averaging over 8 million, more than twice the number of viewers on BBC One and ITV. This episode is the highest-rated show ever on BBC2 under the ratings system first introduced in 2002, beating the previous record set by an episode of Top Gear in 2007. The highest rating for BBC2 of all-time is The 1985 Snooker World Championship Final which peaked with 18.5m viewers. Series 4 had an average of viewing figure of 7.4 million. During the length of the series, the only programmes to have beaten the show on a Tuesday night were EastEnders and Emmerdale.

Official episode viewing figures are from BARB.

Episode no.	Airdate	Viewers (millions)	BBC Two weekly ranking	Weekly ranking all channels	Nightly ranking
1	20 August 2013	6.60	1	11	3
2	27 August 2013	6.65	1	12	3
3	3 September 2013	7.17	1	13	3
4	10 September 2013	6.82	1	18	1
5	17 September 2013	6.95	1	17	3
6	24 September 2013	7.32	1	16	2
7	1 October 2013	7.76	1	13	2
8	8 October 2013	7.41	1	12	2
9	15 October 2013	7.41	1	18	2
10	22 October 2013	9.45	1	4	1

=== Specials ===
The Great British Bake Off, Class of 2012
Episode no.	Airdate	Viewers (millions)	BBC Two weekly ranking
	22 October 2013	3.69	2

The Great British Bake Off Masterclass
Episode no.	Airdate	Viewers (millions)	BBC Two weekly ranking
1	29 October 2013	2.73	4
2	30 October 2013	2.27	10
3	31 October 2013	2.21	13
4	1 November 2013	1.69	24

The Great British Bake Off, Christmas Special
Episode no.	Airdate	Viewers (millions)	BBC Two weekly ranking
	17 December 2013	3.39	2
