= Kouign-amann =

Breton baked sweet goods

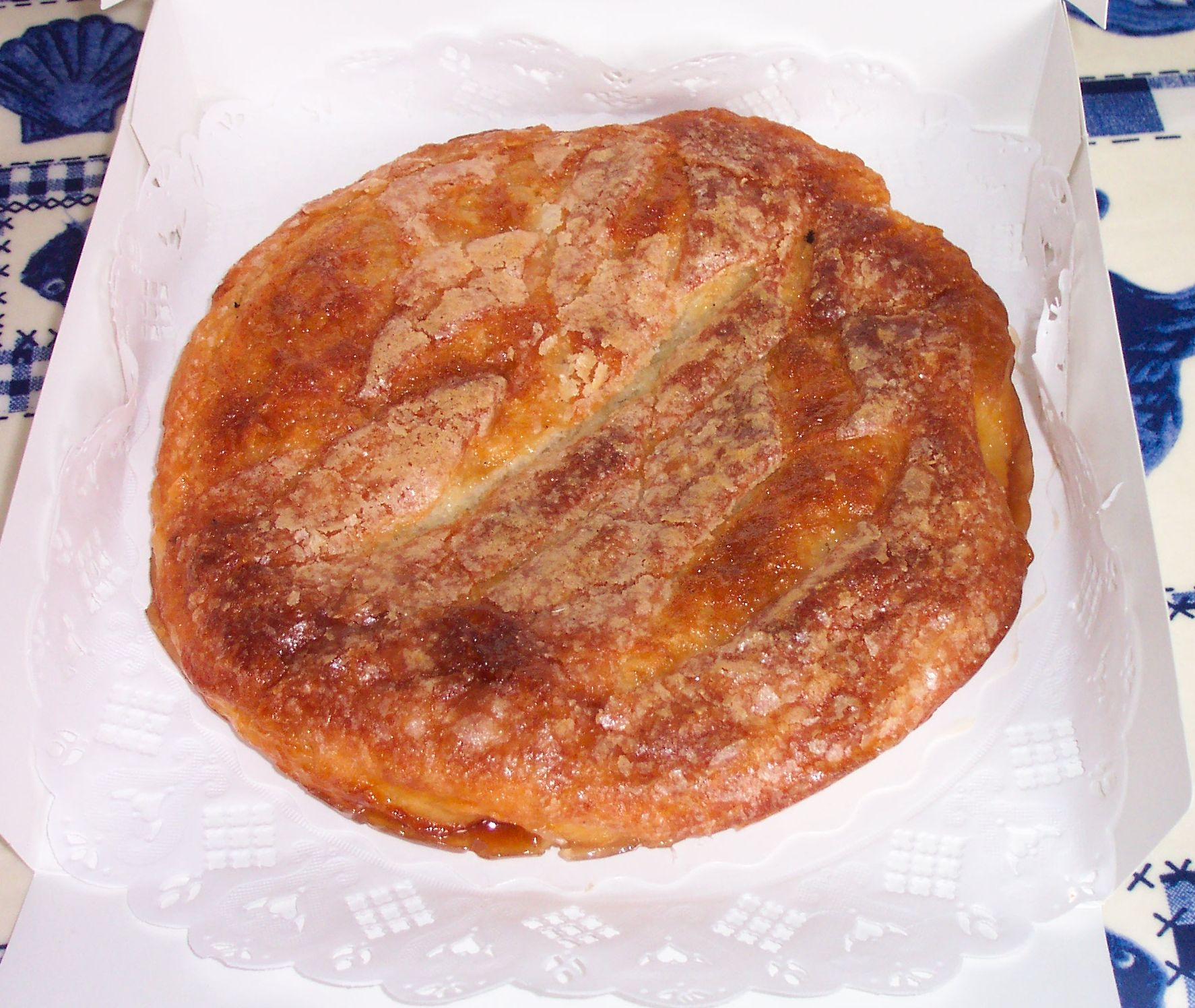
- A kouign-amann
- Type: Bread / Viennoiserie
- Place of origin: France
- Region or state: Brittany
- Main ingredients: Yeast-leavened dough, butter, sugar

Kouign-amann (/ˌkwiːn æˈmɑːn/; Breton: [ˌkwiɲ aˈman]; pl. kouignoù-amann) is a sweet, round Breton laminated dough baked product, originally made with bread dough, but is also made with laminated viennoiserie dough, containing layers of butter and incorporated sugar. It is slowly baked until the sugar caramelizes and steam from the water in the butter expands the dough, resulting in its layered structure. A smaller version, kouignette, is similar to a muffin-shaped, caramelized croissant.

A specialty of the town of Douarnenez in Finistère, Brittany where it originated around 1860, the kouign-amann is attributed to Yves-René Scordia (1828–1878). The name comes from the Breton language words for 'cake' (kouign) and 'butter' (amann), and in 2011 the New York Times described it as "the fattiest pastry in all of Europe."

== Recipe ==
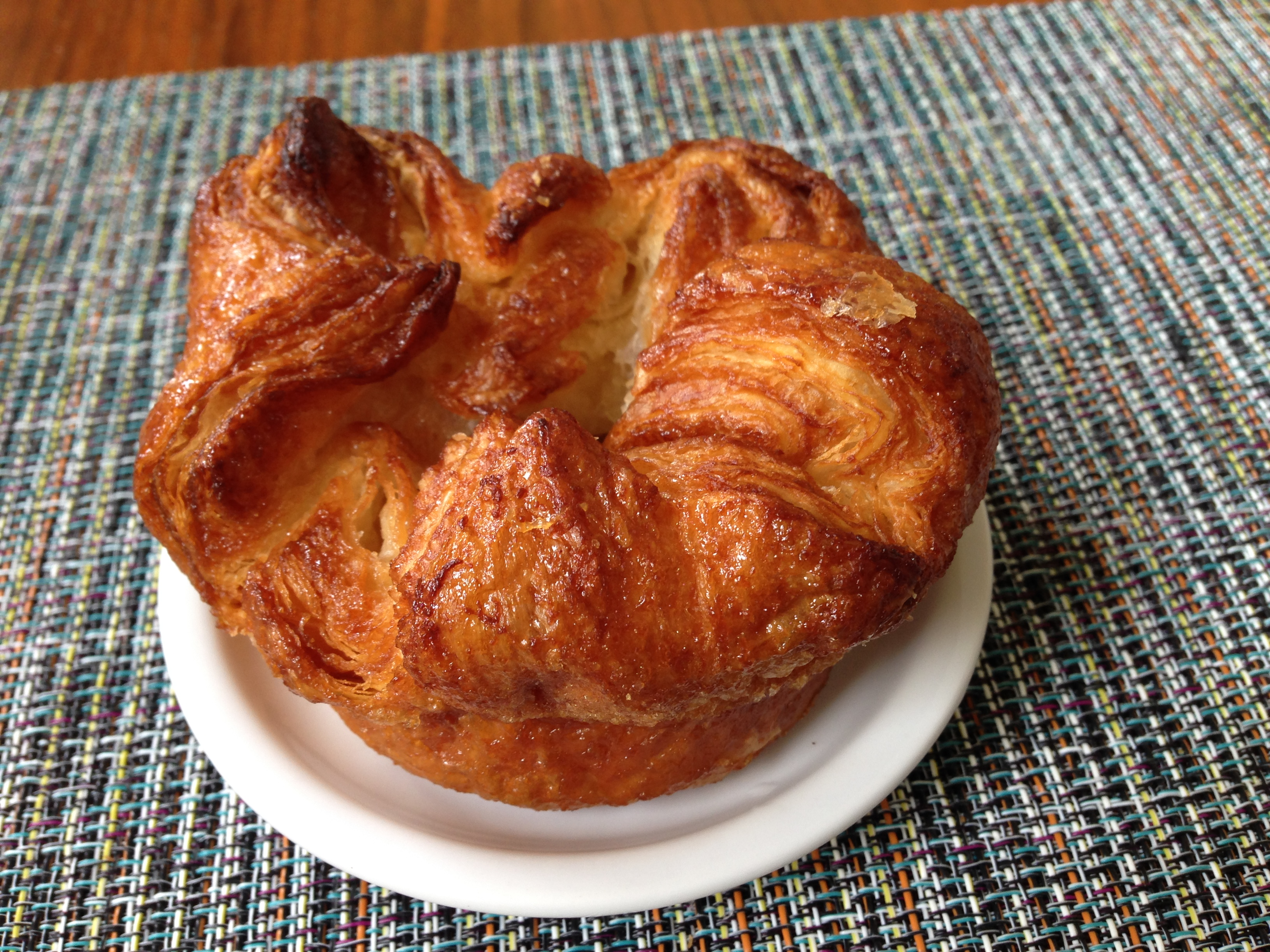
Individual cake

The strict original Douarnenez recipe requires a ratio of 40 percent bread dough, 30 percent butter, and 30 percent sugar. Traditionally, kouign-amann is baked as a large cake and served in slices, although recently, especially in North America, individual cupcake-sized kouignettes have become more popular.

== Popularity ==
Kouign-amann has been a staple at many Japanese bakeries after becoming popular in the late 1990s.

In 2014 episode 7 of series 5 of the BBC's The Great British Bake Off featured kouign-amann. In 2015, notable bakeries in New York City, Washington D.C., Boston, Salt Lake City, and San Francisco began to sell kouign-amann. In Denver, several bakeries offer varieties; some shorten the name to "queen". The making of kouign-amann also featured in Michael Portillo's Great Continental Rail Journeys on BBC TV (series 8, episode 17, 31 March 2025).

As of 2024, kouign-amann had also gained popularity in countries worldwide such as Indonesia thanks to coffeeshop chains that operated in the country such as Éric Kayser.

== See also ==
- Laminated dough
- List of butter dishes
- List of cakes
- List of pastries
