= The Great British Baking Show season 3 =

The third season of The Great British Baking Show, the American title for The Great British Bake Off, refers to:

- The Great British Bake Off series 3 (2012), broadcast initially as the fifth season on PBS in the United States
- The Great British Bake Off series 6 (2015), broadcast initially as the third season on PBS in the United States

== See also ==
- The Great British Baking Show season 1
- The Great British Baking Show season 2
- The Great British Baking Show season 4
- The Great British Baking Show season 5
