= Tea loaf =

English bread

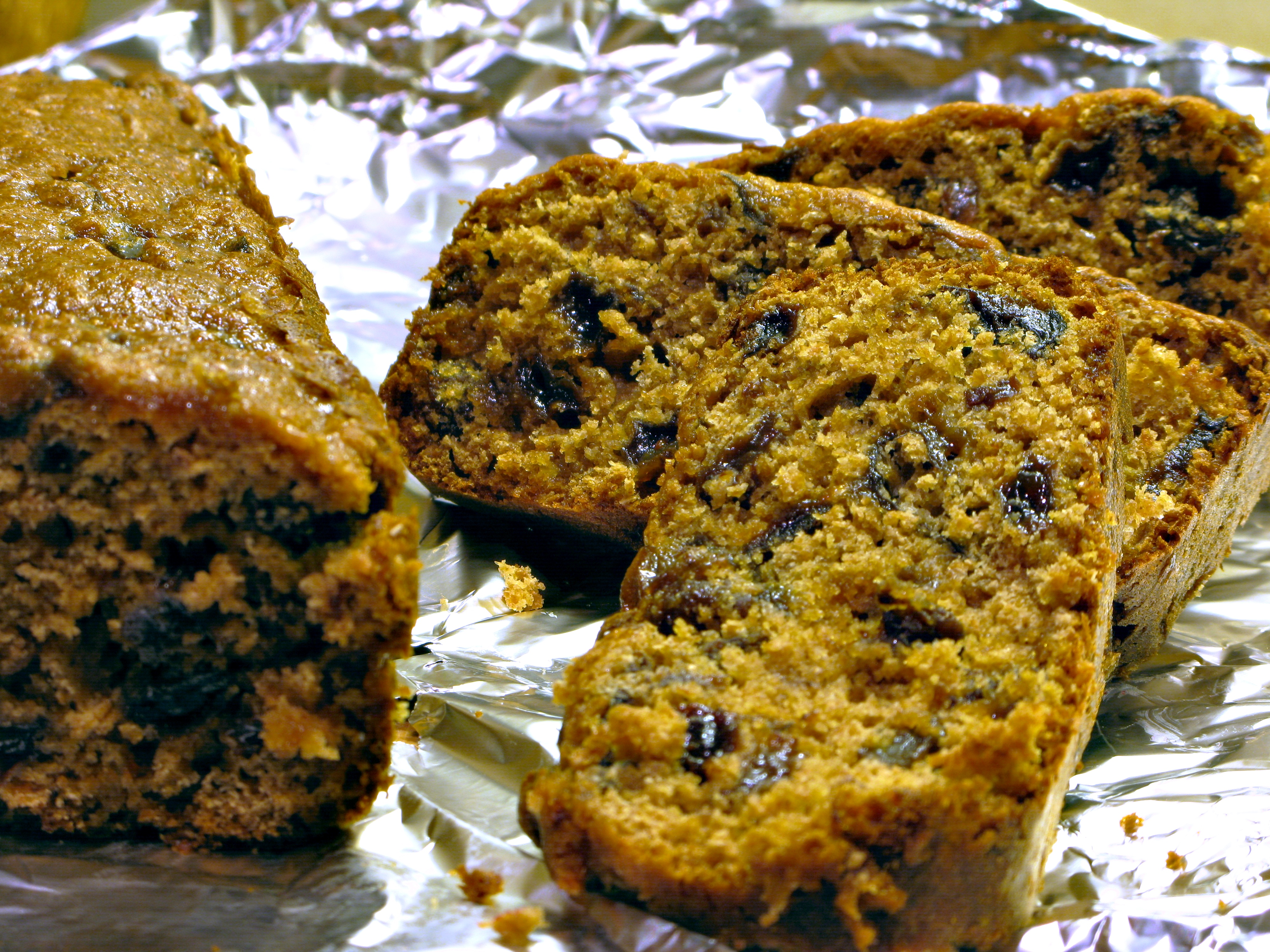
- Place of origin: England
- Region or state: Yorkshire
- Main ingredients: Fruit, cinnamon or other spices

A tea loaf or tea bread is an English bread, made with dried fruit and traditionally served sliced and spread with butter. It is seen as a very traditional cake and the tea loaf is available in cafes and other establishments that serve traditional afternoon tea. It is particularly associated with Yorkshire.

In the making of tea loaves, the fruit (usually currants and sultanas) is soaked in initially hot tea to plump it before mixing it into the batter. The fruit is left in the tea for several hours, or overnight, and so is mainly steeped in cold tea.

The tea used to make the cake was traditionally black tea, but Earl Grey or other teas can also be used.

Eggs are beaten into the tea/fruit mixture to bind the ingredients together and then the flour, sugar and any ground spices (such as mixed spice or cinnamon alone) are added.

Yeast used to be used as the raising agent but self-raising flour is specified in modern recipes.

Although currants and sultanas are traditional fruits, others can also be used such as glace cherries, candied ginger, dried apricots, peel or orange zest.

A key feature of tea bread is the lack of fat in the recipe with the consequence of improved keeping qualities. Indeed, the flavour is often considered to improve with time.

Similar breads include the Welsh bara brith and the Irish barmbrack.

== See also ==
- Malt loaf
- Teacake
