= Bara brith =

Welsh tea bread

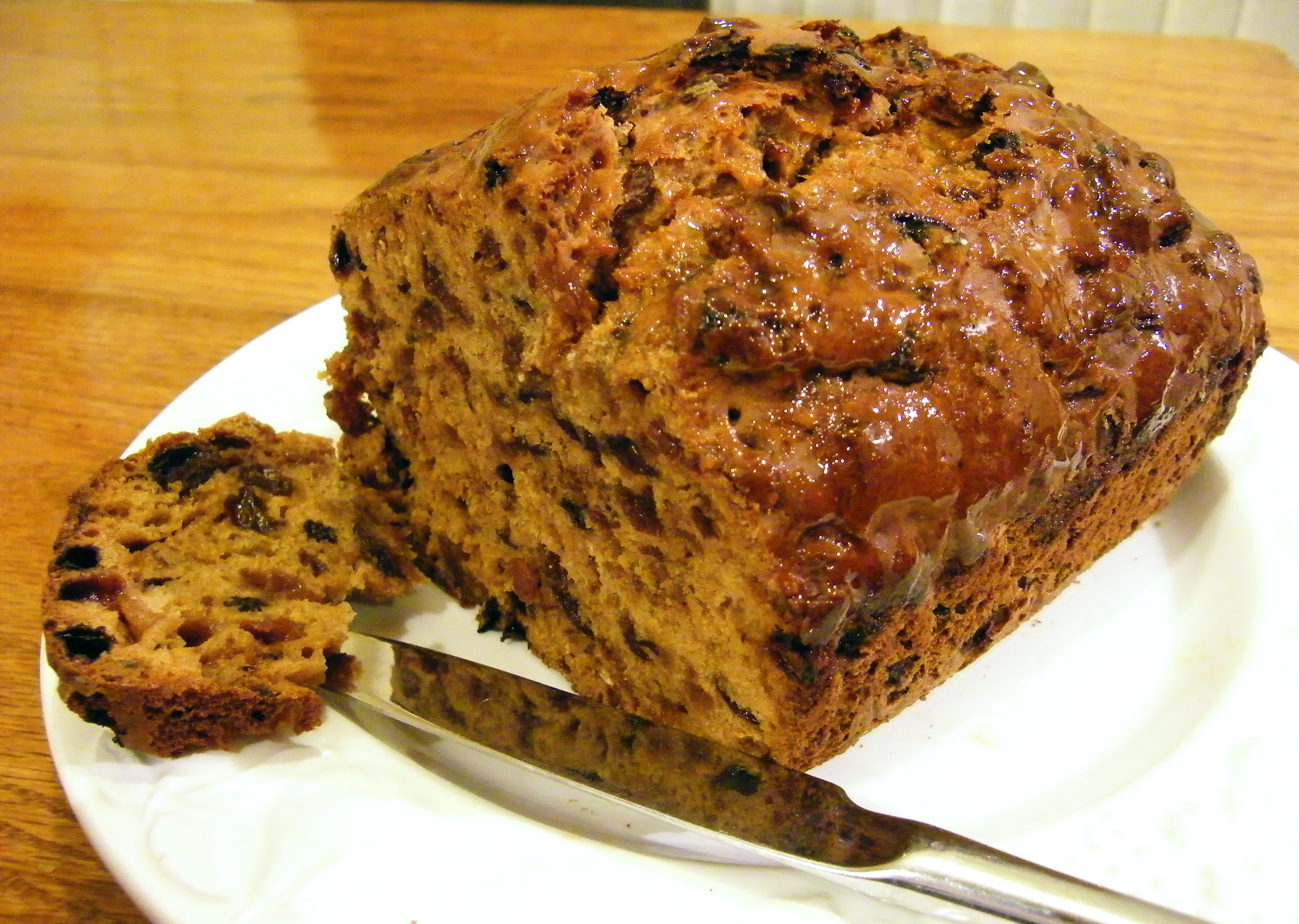
- Bara brith, a traditional Welsh bread
- Type: Fruit loaf
- Place of origin: Wales
- Main ingredients: Yeast, mixed fruit (such as raisins, currants and candied peel)
- Variations: Without yeast, using self-raising flour instead

Bara brith (Welsh: [ˈba(ː)ra briːθ]) is a traditional Welsh tea bread flavoured with tea, dried fruits and spices. It is similar to fruitcake.

It has been championed as a symbol of Welsh cookery by celebrity chefs such as Bryn Williams, especially in response to a decline in popularity in recent decades. In 2007, a survey showed that 36% of teenagers in Wales had never tried it, though far fewer were unaware of it, suggesting it still had a place of cultural significance even though supermarket chain Morrisons had removed their range from shelves a year earlier.

Several variations on bara brith have been made, including changing it into a chocolate, sausages and ice cream.

== History ==
Bara Brith derived its name from the Welsh language, bara meaning bread and brith translating as speckled. It was traditionally made in farmhouses by adding fruit, sugar and spices to the basic bread dough to make a sweet treat for special occasions. It has subsequently been used as a colloquialism—to "over spice the Bara Brith" means to do something to excess.

In 2006, British supermarket chain Morrisons withdrew Bara Brith from sale at 19 of its Wales-based stores. Complaints were issued in the Press, but the company insisted that the bread was removed because of lack of sales. A survey conducted by British supermarket chain Sainsbury's in 2007, showed that 36% of teenagers in Wales surveyed had never tried Bara Brith. When responses across the UK were viewed, some 85% of teenagers had never tried the traditional Welsh bread.

Celebrity chef Phil Vickery baked Bara Brith in Brynsiencyn, Anglesey, in 2011 for a segment on the ITV television series This Morning. He used a traditional recipe which had been handed down to local chef Nerys Roberts through her family. Her bakery had previously supplied British supermarket chain Safeway with Bara Brith, before it was bought out by Morrisons. Beca Lyne-Pirkis baked a Bara Brith for one her entries during the fourth season of the BBC television series The Great British Bake Off in 2013. Although she based it on her grandmother's recipe, she found it difficult to complete within the three hours allocated for that round. But it won praise from judges Paul Hollywood and Mary Berry.

== Recipe ==
The bread is made by mixing flour (either white or self-raising), yeast (if not using self-raising flour), butter, mixed dried fruit (such as raisins, currants and sultanas), mixed spices and an egg. Some recipes favour soaking the dried fruit in tea overnight before the baking. This mixture is then proved to allow fermentation to take place. After an initial period, the air is knocked out of the mixture and it is allowed to prove once more. This period of preparation can take up to two hours, including the resting time for the bread mixture. It is then baked in an oven. Bara Brith is traditionally served at tea time, alongside tea. It is normally served in slices with butter spread on one side.

=== Variations ===
In Argentina, Bara Brith is also known as torta negra ("black cake"). One of the most traditional foods coming out of the Chubut valleys, it was brought by Welsh settlers, who started arriving in the country in 1865. Other variations exist within Wales. Lyne-Pirkis's version of the Bara Brith on The Great British Bake Off substituted a tea oil to replace the overnight soaking process for the fruit. In E. Smith Twiddy's The Little Welsh Cookbook, a cup of cold tea is included in the mixture and marmalade is used as a glaze. Celebrity chef Bryn Williams uses lard in his recipe and a combination of raisins and candied peel as the mixed fruit.

The flavours of a Bara Brith have also been made into other types of food. Pemberton's Victorian Chocolates in Llanboidy, Carmarthenshire, developed a Bara Brith-inspired chocolate in 2009, using a tea-flavoured cream-filled chocolate complemented with dried fruit and possessing a cake-like texture. When Charles, then Prince of Wales, visited Ammanford, Carmarthenshire, in 2011, he tried Bara Brith ice cream. It had been created by a local ice-cream parlour that knew of the Prince's fondness for the bread.

== See also ==
- Barmbrack
