= James B Partridge =

British musician and singing teacher

- Born: January 11, 1991 (age 35); Poole, England
- Education: Downing College, Cambridge
- Occupations: Musician, singing teacher, performer
- Years active: 2010s–present
- Known for: Primary School Bangers
- Website: jamesbpartridge.com

James Bradley Partridge (born January 11 1991) is a British musician and teacher. He is the creator of Primary School Bangers, a live sing-along show based on songs traditionally sung in British primary school assemblies. Partridge initially gained attention through social media videos featuring these songs.

== Early life and education ==
Partridge was born in Poole, Dorset, in 1991. Both of his parents were teachers. He has three brothers, including actor Dan Partridge. He sang in his local church choir and with the Bournemouth Symphony Chorus. After attending Poole Grammar School, Partridge studied music at Downing College, Cambridge, where he was the college's first choral scholar.

== Career ==
=== Teaching and musical work ===
After graduating, Partridge worked for music companies such as PRS for Music before becoming a music and singing teacher in primary schools in London.

Alongside teaching, he worked as a freelance singer and choral performer singing with artists from Paul McCartney and The Rolling Stones and was involved with Gareth Malone’s choir Voices, appearing in high-profile events including the Royal Variety Show and the Classic Brit Awards. From 2013, Partridge also performed regularly around the UK and internationally with his vocal group The Harbour and function band Truly Medley Deeply.

=== Social media success ===
During the COVID-19 pandemic, Partridge began posting musical videos online for pupils and audiences to sing along with. In 2021 he posted a TikTok video ranking popular British school assembly songs, which gained viral attention.

His videos frequently feature nostalgic assembly songs such as Lord of the Dance and Give Me Oil in My Lamp.

=== Primary School Bangers ===
The popularity of Partridge’s videos led to the creation of the live show Primary School Bangers, a participatory sing-along performance featuring songs associated with British primary school assemblies.

The show features Partridge accompanying audiences on piano while encouraging communal singing and sharing humorous reflections on school life.

=== Festivals and media appearances ===
Partridge has performed at events including the Edinburgh Festival Fringe, Camp Bestival and Glastonbury Festival. The Glastonbury Festival 2025 set was filmed for the official BBC Glastonbury coverage and the BBC News TikTok video of his set achieved 6.8 million views.

He has appeared on television and radio programmes including BBC Breakfast, The One Show, Sunday Brunch and Newsround. He regularly appears on BBC national and regional radio stations to talk about singing and education as well as commercial stations such as Virgin Radio.

== Personal life ==
Partridge lives in London and has continued teaching alongside his performing career. He has also written a children's fiction book Dahlia and the Land Without Music, published by Sweet Cherry Publishing.
