= Martha Collison =

British baker and food columnist

- Born: 23 September 1996 (age 30)
- Occupations: Food writer, author, columnist
- Television: The Great British Bake Off
- Website: http://www.bakingmartha.co.uk/

Martha Collison (born 23 September 1996) is a British baker and food columnist. She rose to fame after competing as The Great British Bake Off's youngest ever contestant, reaching the quarter-final of the fifth series at age 17. She writes a weekly column for the Waitrose weekend newspaper, and has released two cookery books as well as running a baking blog.

== Early life ==
Martha Collison grew up in Ascot, Berkshire. She has a younger sister. She began baking at the age of eight, the result of her parents letting her loose in the kitchen

== Career ==
=== Television ===
In 2014, at the age of 17, Collison took part in the fifth series of The Great British Bake Off on BBC One. She is the youngest ever contestant in the show's history, making it to the quarter finals before being knocked out of the competition.

Collison has since appeared on Bake Off: An Extra Slice, as a guest on Blue Peter and has presented for Saturday Kitchen.

=== Writing ===
Collison has released three cookery books. The first, Twist, was released on 14 July 2016, and took simple, everyday recipes, such as chocolate cake and adapted them into new ones, like Chocolate and Passionfruit Layer Cake, or Mint Chocolate Ice Cream Cake. The second book, Crave, was published on 13 July 2017, and split the recipes into chapters for various cravings, Chocolate, Caramel, Cheese, Citrus, Fruit, Nut, Spice and Alcohol. The third book, Pull Up a Chair, was published on 10 June 2025.

She writes a monthly column for the Waitrose weekend newspaper and runs a baking blog called "Baking Martha".

=== Radio ===
Collison is show chef on The Graham Norton Radio Show at Virgin Radio UK.

== Personal life ==
Martha lives with her husband in Brighton, Sussex. They married in 2019; several of the bakers from Collison's series of The Great British Bake Off were in attendance and baked cakes for a cake table. In April 2024, Collison announced on Instagram that she had given birth to their first child.

She is a Christian and has appeared at faith-based festivals such as Newday, Big Church Day Out South & North and WestPoint. She is a charity ambassador for the charity Tearfund, and has spent time in Cambodia teaching girls to bake funnel cakes. She has also been to refugee camps in Lebanon with the charity to see Tearfund's work with those displaced due to conflict.

Her grandmother, Valerie Collison, is an English organist and composer of hymns and carols. Her best-known work is "Come and Join the Celebration" for which she composed both the lyrics and tune.
