= Come and Praise =

Hymnal published by the BBC

Come and Praise is a hymnal published by the BBC and widely used in collective worship in British schools. The hymnal was compiled by Geoffrey Marshall-Taylor with musical arrangements by Douglas Coombes, and includes well-known hymns such as “Oil in My Lamp”, “Kum Ba Yah” and “Water of Life” as well as Christmas carols and Easter hymns.

== Volumes ==
Two volumes were published: Come and Praise in 1978, and Come and Praise 2 in 1988. The hymns from both volumes were published together in The Complete Come and Praise in 1990 alongside a words-only edition. Both volumes were published in connection with BBC School Radio in order to support teachers in leading group singing, particularly in schools without a dedicated music specialist or accompanist. Their use coincided with the continuing practice of collective worship in maintained schools in England and Wales, which was later reinforced in legislation including the Education Reform Act 1988.

== Popularity and reception ==
The first volume of Come and Praise sold over two million copies and was described by the editor Geoffrey Marshall-Taylor as being "music for the people". Because of its extensive use in school assemblies from the late 1970s onwards, the collection became familiar to several generations of pupils in the United Kingdom.

== Cultural legacy ==
Songs from Come and Praise have remained widely associated with school assemblies in the United Kingdom, and several have been retrospectively described in media commentary and online discussions with the phrase ‘assembly bangers’. This informal expression refers to particularly memorable assembly songs and these were celebrated in a special episode of BBC Songs of Praise called The Big School Assembly Singalong. A revived interest was led in the early 2020s by British music teacher James B Partridge, who recorded a series of videos across social media platforms from 2021 charting his personal favourite ‘Assembly Bangers’ as part of his wider efforts to provide material for his pupils during the COVID-19 pandemic. This led to a viral performance of many Come and Praise hymns at Glastonbury Festival 2025.

== CDs ==
=== CD 1 ===
1. Morning has broken
2. Water of life
3. All things bright and beautiful
4. Autumn days
5. Somebody greater
6. The earth is yours, O God
7. Let us with a gladsome mind
8. Who put the colours in the rainbow?
9. Song of Caedmon
10. All nations of the earth
11. God knows me
12. When God made the garden of creation
13. Think of a world without any flowers
14. He made me
15. He's got the whole world
16. Come my brothers, praise the Lord
17. Come and praise the Lord our King
18. Lord of the dance
19. Go tell it on the mountain
20. When Jesus walked in Galilee
21. Jesus Christ is here
22. A man for all people
23. Judas and Mary
24. From the darkness came light
25. Join with us
26. God has promised
27. Thank you Lord
28. Praise the Lord in everything
29. God is love

=== CD 2 ===
1. Praise Him
2. Fill thou my life
3. Travel on
4. Give me oil in my lamp
5. He who would valiant be
6. The journey of life
7. One more step
8. Father, hear the prayer we offer
9. We are climbing
10. When a knight won his spurs
11. Lord of all hopefulness
12. Peace, perfect peace
13. The King of love
14. Colours of day
15. The Lord's my shepherd
16. Lost and found
17. The best gift
18. I listen and I listen
19. The building song
20. Spirit of God
21. The wise may bring their learning
22. When I needed a neighbour
23. In Christ there is no east or west
24. Black and White
25. Kum ba yah
26. The family of Man
27. Cross over the road
28. If I had a hammer
29. A living song
