= The Great British Bake Off series 5 =

Fifth series of The Great British Bake Off

The Great British Bake Off
- Series 5
- Presented by: Mel Giedroyc; Sue Perkins
- Judges: Mary Berry; Paul Hollywood
- No. of contestants: 12
- Winner: Nancy Birtwhistle
- Runners-up: Richard Burr; Luis Troyano
- Location: Welford Park (Berkshire)
- No. of max. bakes: 30
- No. of episodes: 10

Release
- Original network: BBC One
- Original release: 6 August – 8 October 2014

Series chronology
- ← Previous; Series 4 Next → Series 6

The fifth series of The Great British Bake Off first aired on 6 August 2014, with twelve contestants. Mel Giedroyc and Sue Perkins presented the show and Mary Berry and Paul Hollywood returned as judges. Twelve contestants competed in this series, and the competition was held in Welford Park in Berkshire. The series was won by Nancy Birtwhistle, with Luis Troyano and Richard Burr finishing as runners-up.

The programme was moved from BBC Two to BBC One starting this year, but the Masterclass episodes remained on BBC Two. A companion series, The Great British Bake Off: An Extra Slice, hosted by comedian Jo Brand, started this year on BBC Two.

The fifth series was broadcast as the first season on PBS in the United States.

== Bakers ==
| Baker | Age | Occupation | Hometown | Links |
|---|---|---|---|---|
| Chetna Makan | 35 | Fashion Designer | Broadstairs, Kent | |
| Claire Goodwin | 31 | Speech Therapist | Ashton upon Mersey, Trafford | |
| Diana Beard | 69 | Women's Institute (WI) Judge | Alkington, Shropshire | |
| Enwezor Nzegwu | 39 | Business Consultant | Portsmouth, Hampshire | |
| Iain Watters | 31 | Construction Engineer | London/Belfast | |
| Jordan Cox | 32 | IT Manager | Sneinton, Nottingham | |
| Kate Henry | 41 | Furniture Restorer | Brighton, East Sussex | |
| Luis Troyano | 42 | Graphic Designer | Poynton, Cheshire | |
| Martha Collison | 17 | Student | Ascot, Berkshire | |
| Nancy Birtwhistle | 60 | Retired Practice Manager | Barton-upon-Humber, Lincolnshire | |
| Norman Calder | 66 | Retired Naval Officer | Portknockie, Moray | |
| Richard Burr | 38 | Builder | Mill Hill, London | |

== Results summary ==
Elimination chart
| Baker | 1 | 2 | 3 | 4 | 5^{[a]} | 6^{[b]} | 7 | 8 | 9 | 10 |
|---|---|---|---|---|---|---|---|---|---|---|
| Nancy | SB | SAFE | SAFE | SAFE | HIGH | HIGH | HIGH | LOW | LOW | WINNER |
| Luis | SAFE | HIGH | SB | HIGH | SAFE | HIGH | SAFE | HIGH | HIGH | Runner-up |
| Richard | HIGH | SB | SAFE | SB | LOW | LOW | SB | SB | SB | Runner-up |
| Chetna | SAFE | SAFE | SAFE | SAFE | SAFE | SB | SAFE | SAFE | OUT | |
| Martha | HIGH | SAFE | SAFE | SAFE | LOW | SAFE | LOW | OUT | | |
| Kate | SAFE | SAFE | HIGH | HIGH | SB | LOW | OUT | | | |
| Norman | SAFE | LOW | LOW | LOW | OUT | | | | | |
| Diana | SAFE | SAFE | SAFE | SAFE | WD | | | | | |
| Iain | LOW | SAFE | SAFE | OUT | | | | | | |
| Jordan | LOW | SAFE | OUT | | | | | | | |
| Enwezor | SAFE | OUT | | | | | | | | |
| Claire | OUT | | | | | | | | | |

^[a] Diana left the show after episode 4 due to illness. Her departure was announced at the start of episode 5. The night before episode 5 was scheduled to be taped, she suffered a head injury, resulting in an overnight stay in A&E and a loss of her senses of taste and smell that persisted.

^[b] Because the judges were unable to agree, no-one was eliminated this week.

Colour key:

Baker was one of the judges' least favourite bakers that week, but was not eliminated.
Baker was one of the judges' favourite bakers that week, but was not the Star Baker.
Baker got through to the next round.
Baker was eliminated.
Baker withdrew from the show.
Baker was the Star Baker.
Baker was the series runner-up.
Baker was the series winner.

== Episodes ==
Colour key:

Baker was eliminated at conclusion of episode
Baker was named "Star Baker" at conclusion of episode
Baker was named runner-up for the series
Baker won series

=== Episode 1: Cakes ===
For their first bake, the contestants were required to make a Swiss Roll as their signature challenge in 2 1/2 hours. For the technical bake, the bakers were set the challenge of baking a cherry cake in 2 hours using Mary Berry's recipe. In the showstopper challenge, the bakers were given 3^{1}/_{2} hours to bake their own choice of classic British cakes in miniature. The bakers needed to make 36 cakes of identical size, shape and texture.

| Baker | Signature (Swiss Roll) | Technical (Cherry Cake) | Showstopper (36 Classic Miniature British Cakes) | Result |
|---|---|---|---|---|
| Chetna | Cardamom, Pistachio and Coffee Swiss Roll | 3rd | Tiered Victoria Sponges with Lemon Curd and Raspberry Cream | Safe |
| Claire | Chocolatey Orangey Swiss Roll | 8th | Mini Chocolate and Cherry Cakes | Eliminated |
| Diana | Mum's Sunday Tea Lemon Curd Swiss Roll | 5th | Chocolate Ganache Surprises | Safe |
| Enwezor | Raspberry and Lemon Swiss Roll | 9th | Coffee and Walnut Battenberg Squares | Safe |
| Iain | Apricot and Basil Swiss Roll with Mascarpone and White Chocolate Cream | 4th | Lemon Drizzle Cakes with Mascarpone Filling, Drizzled Icing and Candied Lemon | Safe |
| Jordan | Kawaii Frasier Swiss Roll | 12th | Lemon Drizzle Cakes with Blueberry and Lemon Curd | Safe |
| Kate | Red Velvet and White Chocolate Swiss Roll | 6th | Mini Tiered Victoria Sponges | Safe |
| Luis | Spanish Swiss Roll | 7th | Raspberry and Lemon Genoise Slices with Lemon Drizzles | Safe |
| Martha | Tiramisu Swiss Roll | 2nd | Mini Lemon and Thyme Drizzle Cakes | Safe |
| Nancy | Coffee and Hazelnut Swiss Roll | 1st | Jaffa Orange Cakes | Star Baker |
| Norman | Black Forest Swiss Roll | 11th | Almond and Raspberry Mini Cakes | Safe |
| Richard | Pistachio and Strawberry Swiss Roll | 10th | Miniature Coffee and Walnut Cakes | Safe |

=== Episode 2: Biscuits ===
In the signature, the bakers had 2 hours to bake 36 savoury biscuits. In the technical challenge, they had 1 1/4 hours with Mary Berry's recipe for 18 florentines, which the bakers found difficult. In the final challenge, the bakers had 4 hours to make a 3D biscuit scene/structure.

| Baker | Signature (36 Savoury Biscuits) | Technical (18 Florentines) | Showstopper (3D Biscuit Scene) | Result |
|---|---|---|---|---|
| Chetna | Fenugreek and Carom Crackers | 8th | Day On The Beach | Safe |
| Diana | Parmesan Triangles | 7th | Express, First Class | Safe |
| Enwezor | Pumpkin and Sunflower Seed Savoury Biscuits | 9th | Space Adventure Moon Scene | Eliminated |
| Iain | Za'atar and Fig Biscuits | 11th | Wild West Scene | Safe |
| Jordan | Sourdough, Parmesan and Chilli Biscuits | 6th | Monster Attack | Safe |
| Kate | Parmesan and Apple Biscuits | 4th | Tea Time | Safe |
| Luis | Black Olive and Rosemary Biscuits with Caramelised Onion Glaze | 3rd | George Versus The Dragon | Safe |
| Martha | Caramelised Onion and Goat's Cheese Sandwich Biscuits | 5th | Ski Village Scene | Safe |
| Nancy | Fennel and Rye Thins | 2nd | Hansel and Gretel Scene | Safe |
| Norman | Farthing Biscuits | 10th | Zulu Boats at Dawn | Safe |
| Richard | Rosemary Seeded Crackers | 1st | Pirates! | Star Baker |

=== Episode 3: Bread ===
In bread week, the bakers firstly had to make 12 rye bread rolls in 3 1/2 hours. In the technical challenge, they were given 3 hours to make 4 ciabatta loaves using Paul Hollywood's recipe with the advice from Paul that they should be patient. In the showstopper, the bakers were required to make a bread centrepiece in 4 hours. The centrepiece should be a filled-loaf that is spectacular and tasty, and would be judged on its appearance, design and crust, and should be well-baked on the inside.

| Baker | Signature (12 Rye Bread Rolls) | Technical (4 Ciabattas) | Showstopper (Filled Centrepiece Loaf) | Result |
|---|---|---|---|---|
| Chetna | Onion and Pine Nut Rolls | 8th | Rolled and Filled Twin Loaf | Safe |
| Diana | Rustic Picnic Rolls | 7th | Sharing Savoury Pinwheel | Safe |
| Iain | Cranberry and Walnut Rye Bread Rolls | 9th | Moroccan Plaited with a Bessara Dip | Safe |
| Jordan | Rye and Spelt Bread Rolls | 10th | Strawberry Raspberry Cheesecake Brioche | Eliminated |
| Kate | Orange and Cardamom Rye Bread Knots | 1st | Prosciutto, Olive & Coriander Bread | Safe |
| Luis | Opposites Attract Rolls | 2nd | Roscón de Reyes | Star Baker |
| Martha | Date and Walnut Rye Rolls | 3rd | Stuffed Sunflower Loaf | Safe |
| Nancy | Cider and Walnut Crusty Rolls | 5th | 'Full English' Stromboli | Safe |
| Norman | Rye Bread Rolls | 4th | Chicken and Roasted Vegetable Picnic Loaf | Safe |
| Richard | Rye and Cranberry Rolls | 6th | Pesto Pinwheel | Safe |

=== Episode 4: Desserts ===
For the signature bake, the judges gave the bakers 2 hours to make 8 self-saucing puddings, meaning the sauce should come from the bake itself. The bakers may choose to make either a fondant or a sponge which creates its own sauce at the bottom. In the technical, they had to bake Mary Berry's own tiramisu cake recipe in 2 1/2 hours. In the showstopper, they had 4 1/2 hours to make baked Alaskas.

| Baker | Signature (8 Self-Saucing Puddings) | Technical (Tiramisu Cake) | Showstopper (Baked Alaska) | Result |
|---|---|---|---|---|
| Chetna | Rhubarb, Strawberry and Orange Puddings | 3rd | Mango, Raspberry and Coconut Baked Alaska | Safe |
| Diana | Orange and Lemon Curd Pots | 9th | Raspberry Ripple Alaska Swan | Safe |
| Iain | Chocolate, Lime and Raspberry Fondants | 6th | Chocolate, Black Sesame Seed and Coffee Caramel Baked Alaska* | Eliminated |
| Kate | Chocolate and Salted Caramel Molten Puddings | 7th | Pistachio, Raspberry and Chocolate Baked Alaska | Safe |
| Luis | Pears in Puddings | 2nd | Bakewell Alaska | Safe |
| Martha | Peanut Butter Chocolate Fondants | 1st | Key Lime Baked Alaska | Safe |
| Nancy | Pistachio Puddings with Chocolate Sauce | 4th | Summer Pudding Alaska | Safe |
| Norman | Mini Sticky Toffee Puddings | 8th | Baked Alaska with Strawberry Surprise | Safe |
| Richard | Black Forest Chocolate Fondants | 5th | Tiramisu Baked Alaska | Star Baker |

*Many of the bakers struggled to make baked Alaskas, as it was the hottest day of the year so far, and two of five refrigerators were broken, resulting in a struggle among the contestants for enough freezer space. During the bake, Diana took Iain's ice cream and sponge cake assembly out of the freezer to make room for hers, mistakenly leaving it out on a counter in the hot tent. When Iain found it, the ice cream had melted and, frustrated, he threw the sponge cake and melted ice cream in the dustbin. (It was later stated by producers that the dessert was only out for one minute.) Paul and Mary chastised him for this decision, explaining that they would rather have judged sample pieces of each baked Alaska component or even a melted final product than nothing at all, and his decision to present Paul and Mary with nothing to judge contributed to his elimination. Viewers of the show objected on Twitter, attacking Diana. Iain spoke out against these online attacks, and Diana claimed that the editing had distorted the truth, "stitching [her] up". She subsequently withdrew from the show after suffering an injury from a fall.

=== Episode 5: Pies and Tarts ===
For signature challenge, the bakers were set the task of a family-sized custard tart in 2^{1}/_{2} hours. The tart should have a crispy base and silky custard. The technical challenge is set using one of Paul Hollywood's recipes, and the bakers were required to make 6 mini pear pies, which are poached pears surrounded by rough puff pastry, to be completed in 5 hours. In the showstopper, the bakers were tasked with making tiered pies in 4^{1}/_{2} hours. The pies needed to be able to support themselves, and should have at least 3 tiers and share a common theme.

| Baker | Signature (Custard Tart) | Technical (6 Mini Pear Pies) | Showstopper (Three-Tiered Pie) | Result |
|---|---|---|---|---|
| Chetna | Rice Custard Tart with Mangoes and Raspberries | 2nd | Fusion Tiered Pies | Safe |
| Diana | Withdrew (Note: Before the signature round began, it was announced that Diana had withdrawn from the competition for health reasons; though specifics were not mentioned on air, Diana stated later that she had lost her sense of taste and smell in a fall.) | | | |
| Kate | Rhubarb and Custard Tart | 3rd | Rhubarb, Prune and Apple Pies | Star Baker |
| Luis | Tropical Manchester Tart | 6th | Four Fruity Seasons Tower | Safe |
| Martha | Pistachio, Apricot and Honey Custard Tart | 1st | Three Little Pigs Pie | Safe |
| Nancy | Chocolate Crusted Passion Fruit Tart | 4th | Trio of Apple Pies | Safe |
| Norman | Tarte au Citron | 5th | Pieful Tower | Eliminated |
| Richard | Fig and Orange Tart | 7th | Three Course Autumn Pie Feast | Safe |

=== Episode 6: European Cakes ===
For the signature bake, the challenge was to bake a European-inspired cake, but it had to be leavened with yeast. The bakers were given 3 hours for the challenge. The technical challenge was set using one of Mary Berry's recipes for a Swedish Princess cake, Prinsesstårta. The recipe is the most complicated yet, requiring 26 separate ingredients with 14 stages, and to be completed in 2^{1}/_{4} hours. For the showstopper challenge, the bakers were required to make a contemporary version of the Hungarian Dobos Torte in 5 hours. The cake should have at least two tiers, with particular emphasis on caramel sugar work on the cake.

| Baker | Signature (Yeast-Leavened Cake) | Technical (Prinsesstårta) | Showstopper (Dobos Torte) | Result (Note: No one was eliminated this week as the judges could not agree on the worst-performing baker, stating it was between Richard and Kate. As Diana left the show before the previous week's contest due to illness, it was possible not to eliminate anyone.) |
|---|---|---|---|---|
| Chetna | Orange Savarin with Cinnamon Cream | 2nd | Almond Liqueur Dobos Torte with Chocolate Caramel Buttercream | Star Baker |
| Kate | Pecan, Chocolate and Sour Cherry Yeast Cake | 6th | Trio of Dobos Tortes | Safe |
| Luis | Apple and Cinnamon Kugelhopf with Honeyed Apples | 3rd | The Cage on the Rocky Hill | Safe |
| Martha | Dark Chocolate and Almond Liqueur Savarin | 4th | Chess-Themed Chocolate and Salted Caramel Dobos Torte | Safe |
| Nancy | Rum Punch Savarin with Coconut Cream and Tropical Fruits | 1st | Chocolate and Caramel Dobos Torte | Safe |
| Richard | Fruity Guglhupf with an Orange Glaze | 5th | Sugar Forest Dobos Torte | Safe |

=== Episode 7: Pastry ===
In their first task, the bakers were set the challenge of making 12 savoury pastry parcels, to be completed in 1^{3}/_{4} hours. The parcels can be of any type of pastries, but should be uniform in size, well-filled, perfectly cooked and well-sealed to prevent leaks. The technical bake was, for the first time that none of the bakers had heard of, the Breton pastry, kouign-amann, using one of Paul Hollywood's recipes. The bakers should make 12 identical kouign-amanns in 3^{1}/_{2} hours. For the final challenge, the bakers were required to make 24 éclairs of two different flavours (12 of each) in 4 hours. The éclairs should be made of choux pastry and éclair-shaped, otherwise the bakers were free to do as they wished to produce a showstopper.

| Baker | Signature (12 Savoury Parcels) | Technical (12 Kouign-Amann) | Showstopper (24 Éclairs) | Result |
|---|---|---|---|---|
| Chetna | Crispy Lentil Kachori | 6th | Chocolate and Mango & Lemon Meringue Éclairs | Safe |
| Kate | Spinach and Paneer Spicy Samosa | 4th | Neapolitan & Lemon Meringue Éclairs | Eliminated |
| Luis | Childhood Empanadas | 5th | Stars and Stripes Éclairs | Safe |
| Martha | Mini Beef Wellingtons | 3rd | Rhubarb and Custard & Maple Syrup and Bacon Éclairs | Safe |
| Nancy | Spicy Duck Pasties | 2nd | Smoked Salmon and Horseradish & Raspberry Ripple Éclairs | Safe |
| Richard | Minted Lamb Pasties | 1st | Stair of Éclairs | Star Baker |

=== Episode 8: Advanced Dough (Quarterfinals) ===
For the signature bake, they were given the challenge of making sweet fruit loaves that must be free form. They had 2^{1}/_{2} hours for the bake which is challenging as the bakers were required to use enriched dough which takes longer to proof. In the technical, they had 2^{1}/_{2} hours to make a povitica, which Chetna had made for her signature loaf. This technical challenge was particularly hard for most of the bakers, many of whose loafs were raw inside and deemed unsafe to eat. Doughnuts were set as the challenge in the final task, and the bakers were required to make 18 each of two different sorts, to be completed in 4 hours.

| Baker | Signature (Fruit Loaf) | Technical (Povitica) | Showstopper (36 Doughnuts) | Result |
|---|---|---|---|---|
| Chetna | Date and Walnut Swirl Bread | 1st | Chocolate Mousse Filled Doughnuts; Braided Doughnuts | Safe |
| Luis | Black Forest Cherry Tree | 2nd | Cocktail Doughnuts | Safe |
| Martha | Spiced Plum Iced Bread Swirl | 5th | Glazed Lemon & Poppyseed Doughnuts; Chocolate & Passion Fruit Doughnuts | Eliminated |
| Nancy | Lincolnshire Plum Braid | 3rd | Doughnut Family Tree | Safe |
| Richard | Fruit Swedish Tea Ring | 4th | Rhubarb and Custard and Toffee Apple Doughnuts | Star Baker |

=== Episode 9: Pâtisserie (Semi-final) ===
For the signature challenge, the bakers had to make baklava, including their own filo pastry, with a time limit of 3^{1}/_{2} hours to complete the challenge. There had to be two different types of baklava, and 24 portions in total. For the technical challenge, the bakers had to make a schichttorte, and had 2 hours to complete it. There had to be 20 layers in their schichttorte, and was one of Paul Hollywood's recipes. For the showstopper challenge, the bakers had to make entremets, very small and fine cakes put in a window of a French pâtisserie. They had to make two different types of entremets, 12 of each, and had 5 hours to complete the challenge.

| Baker | Signature (24 Baklava) | Technical (Schichttorte) | Showstopper (24 Entremets) | Result |
|---|---|---|---|---|
| Chetna | Chocolate Orange Baklava; Masala Chai Baklava | 4th | Chocolate, Orange & Nut Entremets; Cappuccino Entremets | Eliminated |
| Luis | Indian Rose Baklava; Halwa Baklava Rolls | 1st | Chocolate Mousse & Cherry Entremets; Pomegranate, Fig & Pistachio Sponge | Safe |
| Nancy | Coffee and Chocolate Baklava; Breakfast Baklava | 3rd | Raspberry Nonnettes; Lime and Passion Fruit Entremets | Safe |
| Richard | Rose and Pistachio Baklava; Walnut and Almond Baklava | 2nd | Hazelnut Mocha Entremets; Pink Grapefruit Entremets | Star Baker |

=== Episode 10: Final ===
In the final signature challenge, the bakers had to make Viennoiserie in 3^{1}/_{2} hours. They had to make 2 different types of the pastry. In the final technical, the judges decided to bring things "back to basics" by asking the bakers to bake 12 Victoria Sandwiches, Tartes au Citron and Scones. The challenge, however, was that they had only 2 hours to make this with only 3 instructions. The final showstopper was a Pièce Montée. The bakers were given 5 hours to make this, and the judges said it must be in some self-standing structure.

| Baker | Signature (Viennoiserie) | Technical (12 Mini Victoria Sandwiches, 12 Mini Tarte au Citron, 12 Mini Scones) | Showstopper (Pièce Montée) | Result |
|---|---|---|---|---|
| Luis | Apple, Walnut, Raisin and Cheshire Cheese Chaussons; Pain au Chocolat Blanc with Raspberries and Cream Cheese | 2nd | Village in Chocolate | Runner-up |
| Nancy | Apple and Lemon Kites; Raspberry and Almond Croissants | 1st | Red Windmill | Winner |
| Richard | Pear Pain au Chocolat; Pain au Lait | 3rd | Mill on the Hill | Runner-up |

=== Masterclasses ===
Mary and Paul demonstrated how to bake the technical challenges that they set for the bakers as well as their own favorite recipes for some of the other challenges set in the series. They also gave some tips on baking techniques. The Masterclasses episodes were shown on BBC2.

==== Episode 1 ====
| | Bake 1 | Bake 2 | Bake 3 |
|---|---|---|---|
| Mary | Cherry Cake | Florentines | Miniature Coffee and Walnut Cakes |
| Paul | Blackcurrant and Liquorice; Swiss Roll | Savoury Biscuits | — |

==== Episode 2 ====
| | Bake 1 | Bake 2 | Bake 3 |
|---|---|---|---|
| Mary | Tiramisu Cake | Neapolitan Baked Alaska | — |
| Paul | Ciabatta | Roquefort and Walnut Loaf | Chocolate Volcanoes |

==== Episode 3 ====
| | Bake 1 | Bake 2 | Bake 3 |
|---|---|---|---|
| Mary | Chocolate and Orange Tart | Prinsesstårta | Almond Praline and Caramel-Coated Hazelnut Dobos Torte |
| Paul | Mini Sausage Plaits | Kouign-Amann | — |

==== Episode 4 ====
| | Bake 1 | Bake 2 | Bake 3 |
|---|---|---|---|
| Mary | Lemon and Raspberry Éclairs | Double Chocolate Mousse Entremets | — |
| Paul | Chocolate and Cherry Loaf | Povitica | Chocolate and Raspberry Doughnuts |

==== Christmas special ====
| | Bake 1 | Bake 2 | Bake 3 |
|---|---|---|---|
| Mary | White Chocolate and Ginger Cheesecake | Genoa Cake | Almond Galette |
| Paul | St. Lucia Buns | Mincemeat and Marzipan Couronne | Kransekake |

== Controversy ==
=== "Bingate" ===
In the fourth episode of the series, there was controversy over the events that preceded the elimination of contestant Iain Watters. During the final showstopper round contestants were tasked with producing a baked Alaska. Iain's ice cream was shown as having not set, and in a show of frustration, he threw his bake in the bin. The editing of the show suggested that another contestant, Diana Beard, had caused the failure by removing the ice cream from a freezer for her own ice cream, and the perceived "sabotage" resulted in a furore on social media networks.

More than 800 complaints were lodged with the BBC, and some complained to the communication watchdog Ofcom. Some members of the cast, however, posted comments in support of Diana, and a BBC spokesman later issued a statement:

"As shown in the episode, Iain became the fourth baker to leave the tent because he didn't present Paul and Mary with anything to judge in the showstopper challenge and both judges were very clear about the reasoning behind the decision. Due to the extreme temperature in the tent that day, many of the bakers struggled to get their ice cream to set as seen in the episode. Diana removing Iain's ice cream from the freezer for less than a minute was in no way responsible for Iain's departure."

The claim that his dish was only left out for a short time was, however, challenged by Iain Watters, who said that it was left long enough to ruin the dessert.

Fellow contestant Jordan Cox criticized the show's production, claiming the freezers were not very good in quality, and were chosen only for their aesthetics.

Diana Beard left the show before the next episode was filmed due to illness.

Beard later gave an interview to BBC Radio Shropshire:

"I'm disappointed with the way it's been portrayed. I've been stitched up, haven't I? We were 12 amateur bakers, [there's] no prize money involved. Why would I sabotage Iain's Baked Alaska? This has made it look like some cutthroat competition. I think someone's culpable for the editing, really."

Beard also said that Iain's ice cream had been out of the freezer for no more than 40 seconds, and that her conscience was clear.

The incident would later be referenced by contestant Iain Ross (also from Belfast) in series 16. Tasked to create a showstopper 'vacherin glacé' consisting of ice cream and meringue, Ross was inspired by his and Watters' shared first name and hometown, creating a 'Bingate Redemption' dessert using the same flavours of Watters' baked Alaska.

=== Innuendo ===
A number of viewers complained to the BBC feedback show Points of View in the fifth series about the "constant smutty remarks" from the presenters Mel and Sue. This series was seen as having more innuendos than previous ones; some reviewers noted the "extra pinch of saucy spice" and "the increasingly filthy-minded hosts Mel Giedroyc and Sue Perkins", though Series 3 winner John Whaite argued that innuendo is part of what made the show a success, while Paul Hollywood described the innuendo as banter in the spirit of the Carry On films and is a part of British culture, a view shared by others.

== Post-show careers ==
Richard Burr's book on baking, BIY: Bake it Yourself, was released on 16 August 2015.

Luis Troyano also wrote a book, Bake It Great, released on 20 August 2015. He died of oesophageal cancer in November 2020 at the age of 48.

Chetna Makan has written a baking book The Cardamom Trail, released on 21 March 2016, as well as a cookbook Chai, Chaat & Chutney: A Street Food Journey Through India, published on 6 July 2017. Makan has continued to write cookbooks focused on Indian cooking, with Chetna's Healthy Indian, Chetna's Healthy Indian Vegetarian, and Chetna's 30-Minute Indian published in 2019, 2020, and 2021 respectively.

Martha Collison has written two baking books, Twist, released on 14 July 2016, and Crave, published 13 July 2017 with Harper Collins. She also has a weekly column with Waitrose and is a charity ambassador for Tearfund.

Nancy Birtwhistle released her first book ‘Sizzle and Drizzle’ in 2020. She released her second book, Clean & Green: 101 Hints and Tips for a More Eco-Friendly Home in 2021.

== Ratings ==
The series started with its highest ratings for its opening episode after its move to BBC One, with over 7 million tuning in according to overnight figures. This is adjusted to 8.5 million for its 7-day final viewing figure, making this its second most-watched episode after previous year's final. In the fourth episode, 8.1 million watched the original broadcast, but the "bingate" controversy gained the show a further 2 million viewers on the BBC iPlayer catch-up service, giving the show the biggest ever audience with 10.248 million viewers for the episode. The final of the show gained an overnight viewing figure of 12.29 million, and a consolidated average figure of 13.5 million, the highest viewing figure for a non-sporting event of the year on UK TV, after 2014 FIFA World Cup's England vs Uruguay match. Series 5 had an average of viewing figure of 10.1 million.

Official episode viewing figures are from BARB.

| Episode no. | Airdate | Viewers (millions) | BBC One weekly ranking | Weekly ranking all channels |
|---|---|---|---|---|
| 1 | 6 August 2014 | 8.51 | 1 | 1 |
| 2 | 13 August 2014 | 8.79 | 1 | 1 |
| 3 | 20 August 2014 | 9.28 | 1 | 1 |
| 4 | 27 August 2014 | 10.25 | 1 | 2 |
| 5 | 3 September 2014 | 9.95 | 1 | 2 |
| 6 | 10 September 2014 | 10.13 | 1 | 2 |
| 7 | 17 September 2014 | 10.28 | 1 | 2 |
| 8 | 24 September 2014 | 9.02^{3} | 2 | 4 |
| 9 | 1 October 2014 | 10.67 | 1 | |
| 10 | 8 October 2014 | 13.51 | 1 | |

^{^Note 3} The programme was rescheduled to BBC Two in Scotland due to a football game.

=== Specials ===
The Great British Bake Off Masterclass
| Episode no. | Airdate | Viewers (millions) | BBC Two weekly ranking |
|---|---|---|---|
| 1 | 9 October 2014 | 1.99 | 12 |
| 2 | 10 October 2014 | 1.53 | 24 |
| 3 | 15 October 2014 | 2.16 | 7 |
| 4 | 16 October 2014 | 1.42 | 23 |

The Great British Bake Off, Class of 2013
| Episode no. | Airdate | Viewers (millions) | BBC Two weekly ranking |
|---|---|---|---|
| | 12 October 2014 | — | — |

The Great British Bake Off, Christmas Masterclass
| Episode no. | Airdate | Viewers (millions) | BBC Two weekly ranking |
|---|---|---|---|
| | 16 December 2014 | 3.03 | 5 |
