= Florentine biscuit =

Nut and fruit cookie

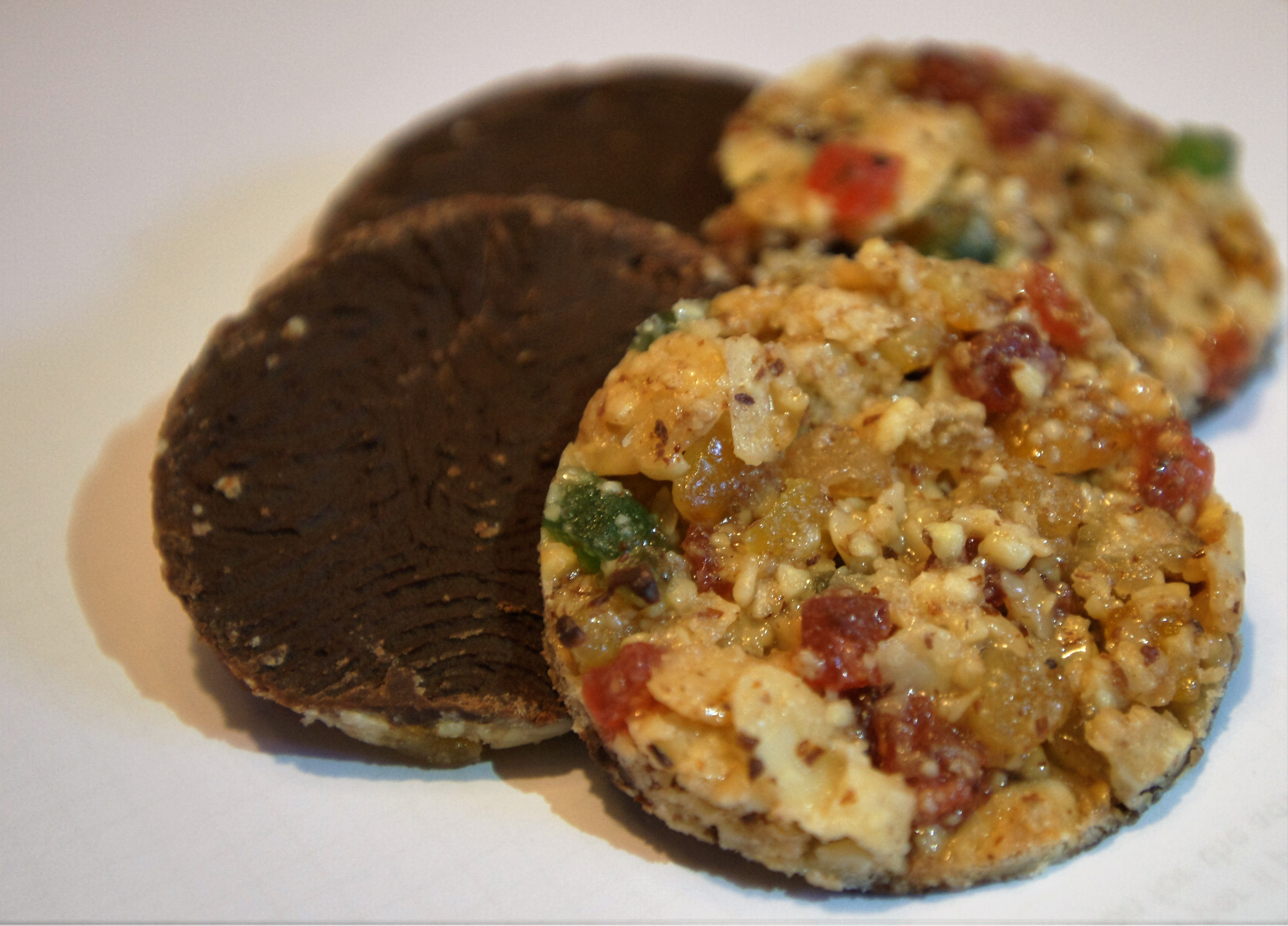
- Florentine biscuits
- Alternative names: Florentine, biscotto fiorentino (in Italian)
- Type: Biscuit
- Region or state: Named after Florence, Italy
- Main ingredients: Nuts, candied cherries, sugar, butter, honey, dark chocolate

Florentine biscuit (or simply, Florentine) is a sweet biscuit of nuts and fruit.

It was most likely invented in France in the 17th century and not in Italy (despite their name).

Florentines are made of nuts (typically hazelnuts and almonds) and candied cherries mixed with sugar melted together with butter and honey, cooked in an oven. They are often coated on the bottom with chocolate, which is traditionally scored in a wave pattern with the tines of a fork for decoration. Other types of candied fruit are used as well. They typically contain neither flour nor eggs.

== See also ==
Media related to Florentine (biscuit) at Wikimedia Commons
