= Buckwheat pancake =

Pancake made with buckwheat flour

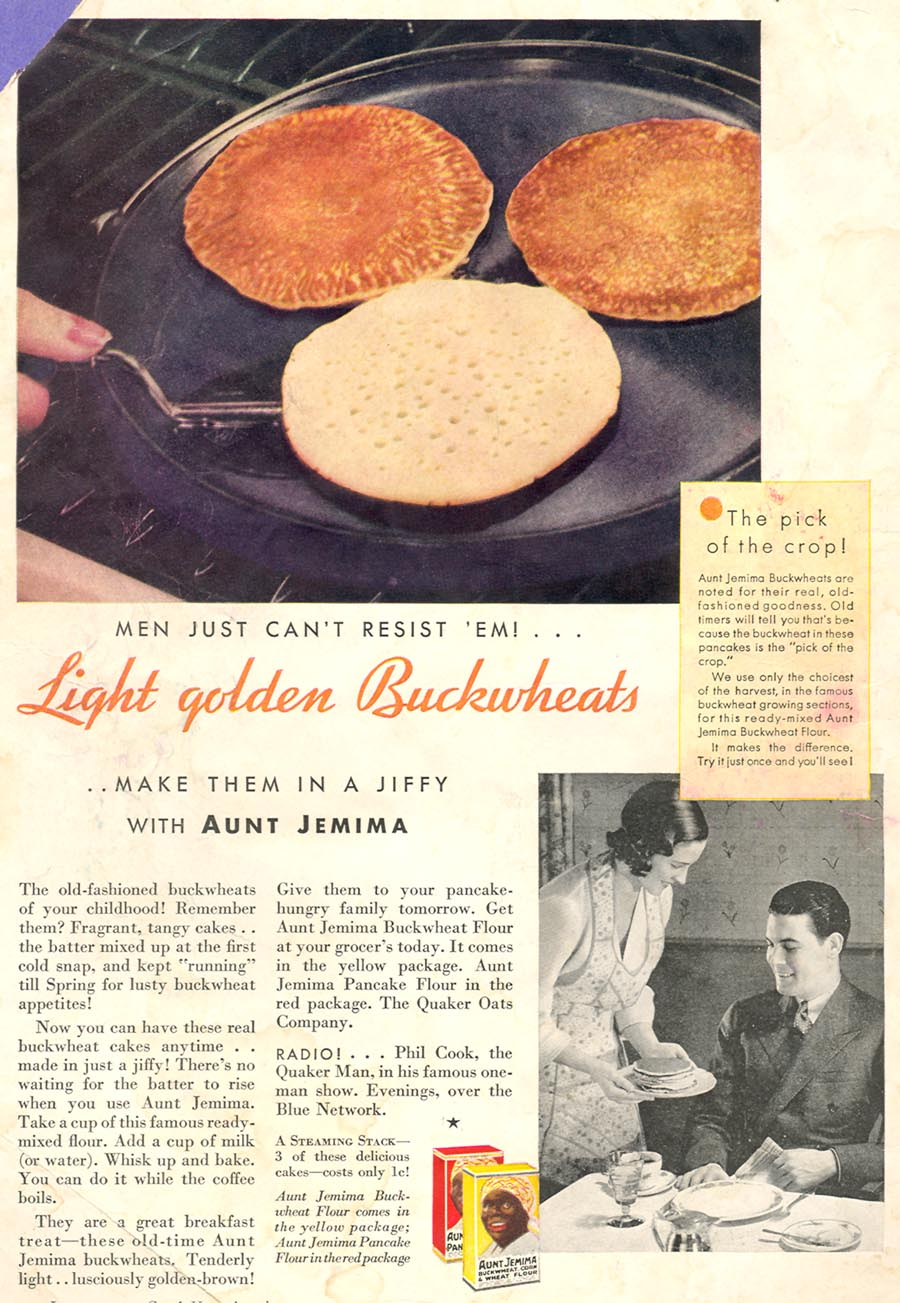
Aunt Jemima Pancake Mix advertisement, 1932

A buckwheat pancake is a pancake made with buckwheat flour. Types of buckwheat pancake associated with specific regions include:

- Blini, Eastern Europe, with a buckwheat variety particularly popular in Russia, Ukraine (hrechanyky or гречаники), and Lithuania (grikių blynai)
- Crêpe bretonne (krampouezhen in Breton), a savory pancake also known as bleud ed-du from Lower Brittany in France
- Kaletez (galette de sarrasin), a buckwheat pancake from the Upper Brittany cuisine in France.
- Memil-buchimgae, a variety of Korean pancake with buckwheat flour and cabbage
- Ploye, a pancake particularly popular in New Brunswick and Maine.
- Buckwheat cake, a pancake popular in Preston County, West Virginia, home of the annual Buckwheat Festival.

== Gallery ==
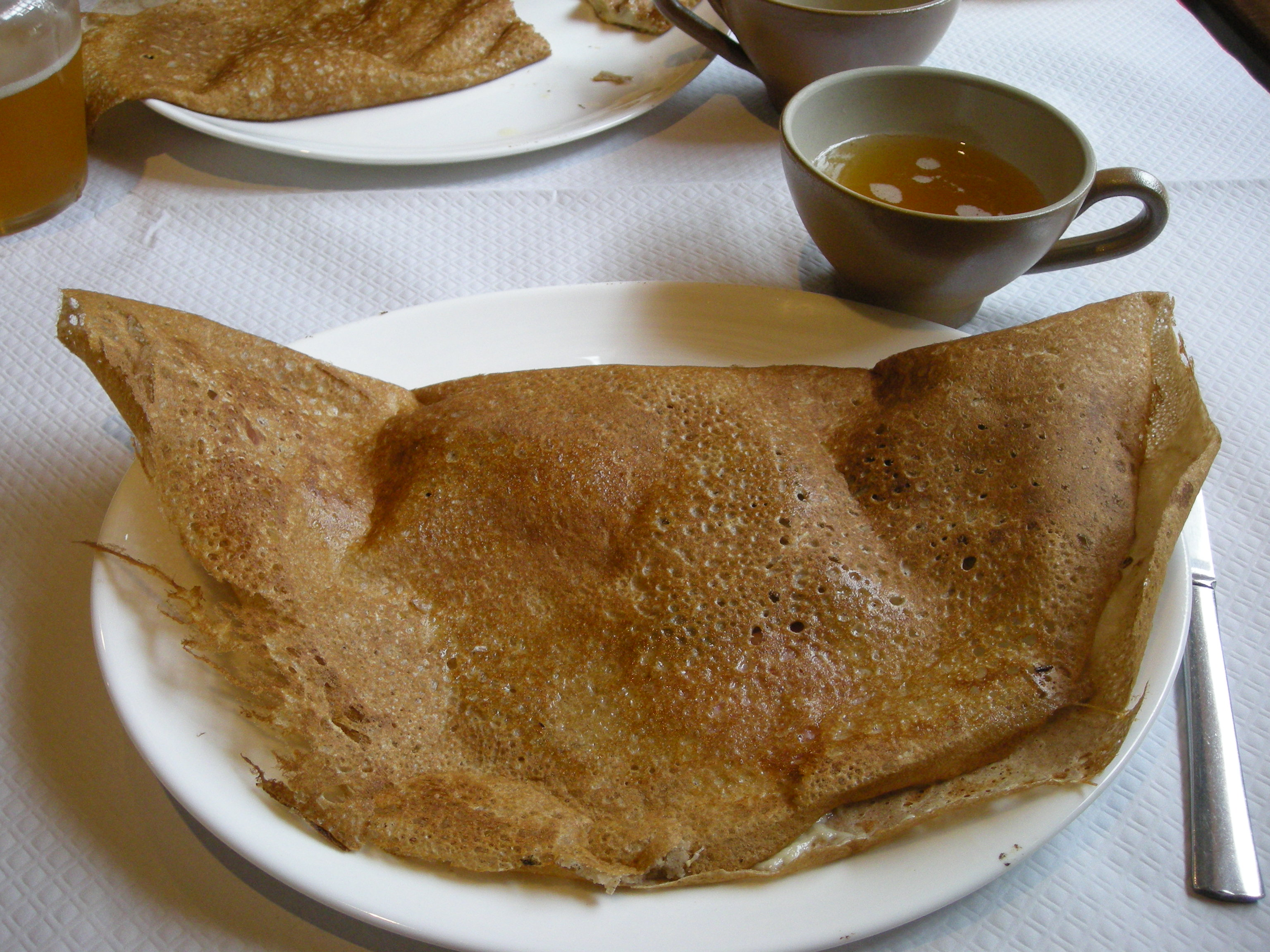
Kaletez

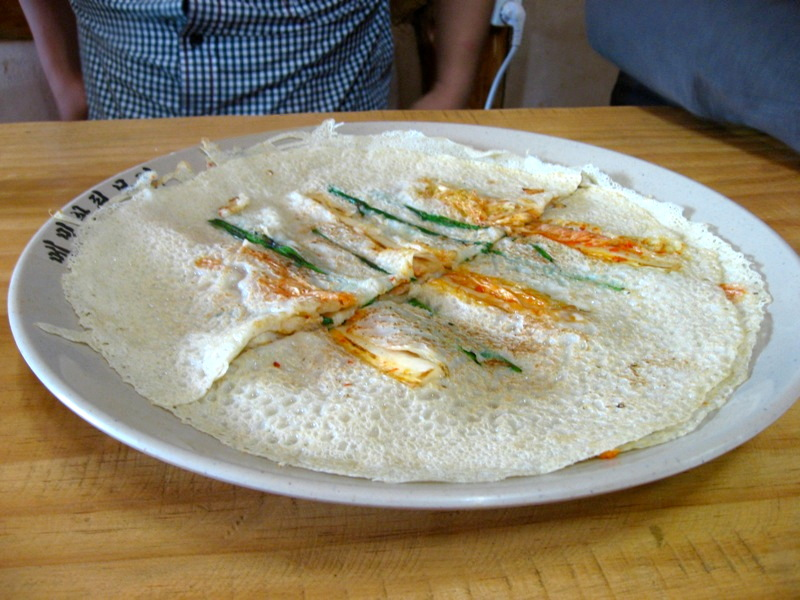
Memil-buchimgae

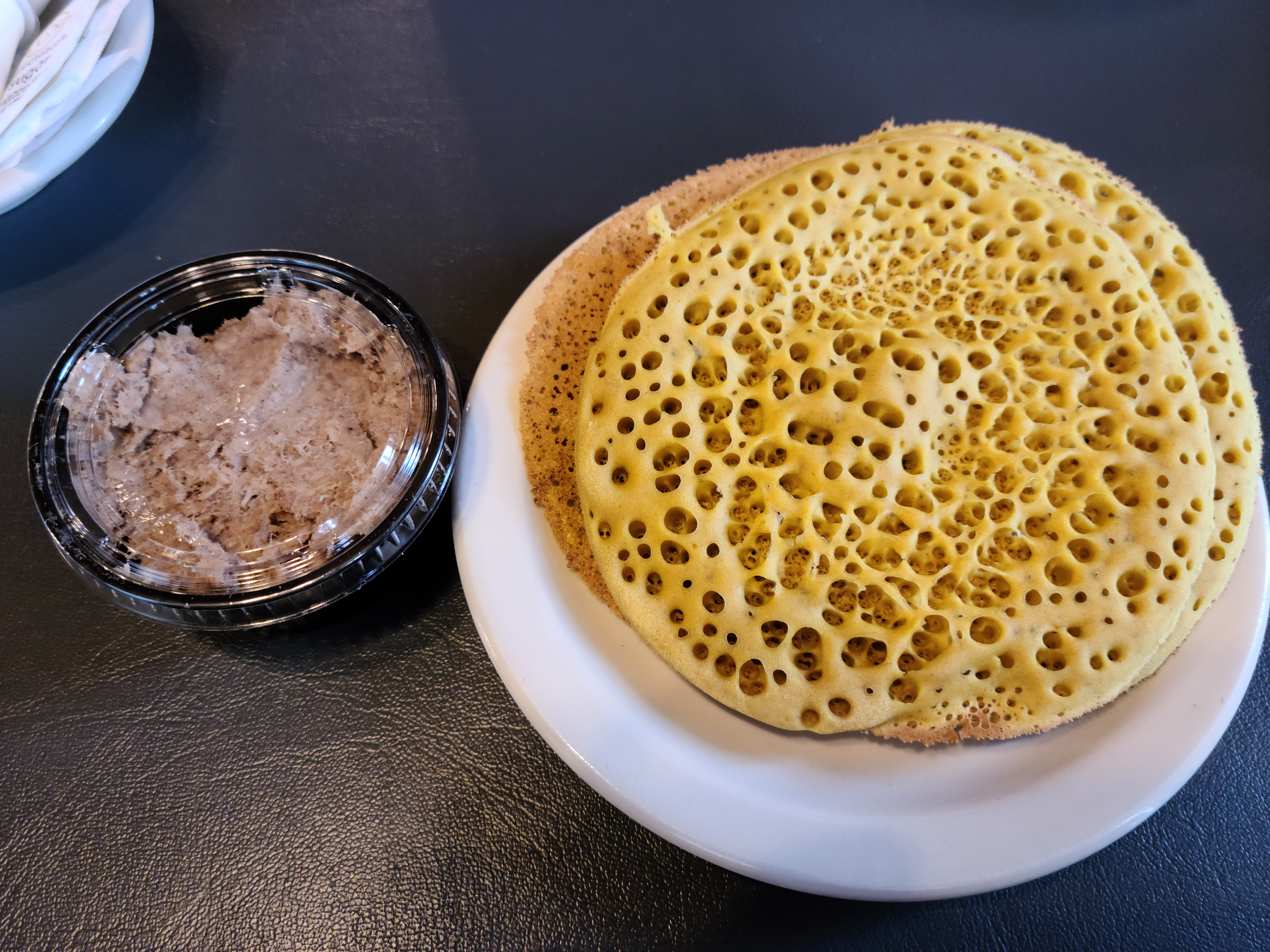
Ploye

== See also ==
- List of buckwheat dishes
