= List of buckwheat dishes =

This is a list of buckwheat dishes, consisting of dishes that use buckwheat as a main ingredient. Buckwheat is a plant cultivated for its grain-like seeds and as a cover crop. A related and more bitter species, Fagopyrum tataricum, a domesticated food plant common in Asia, but not as common in Europe or North America, is also referred to as buckwheat.

== Buckwheat dishes ==
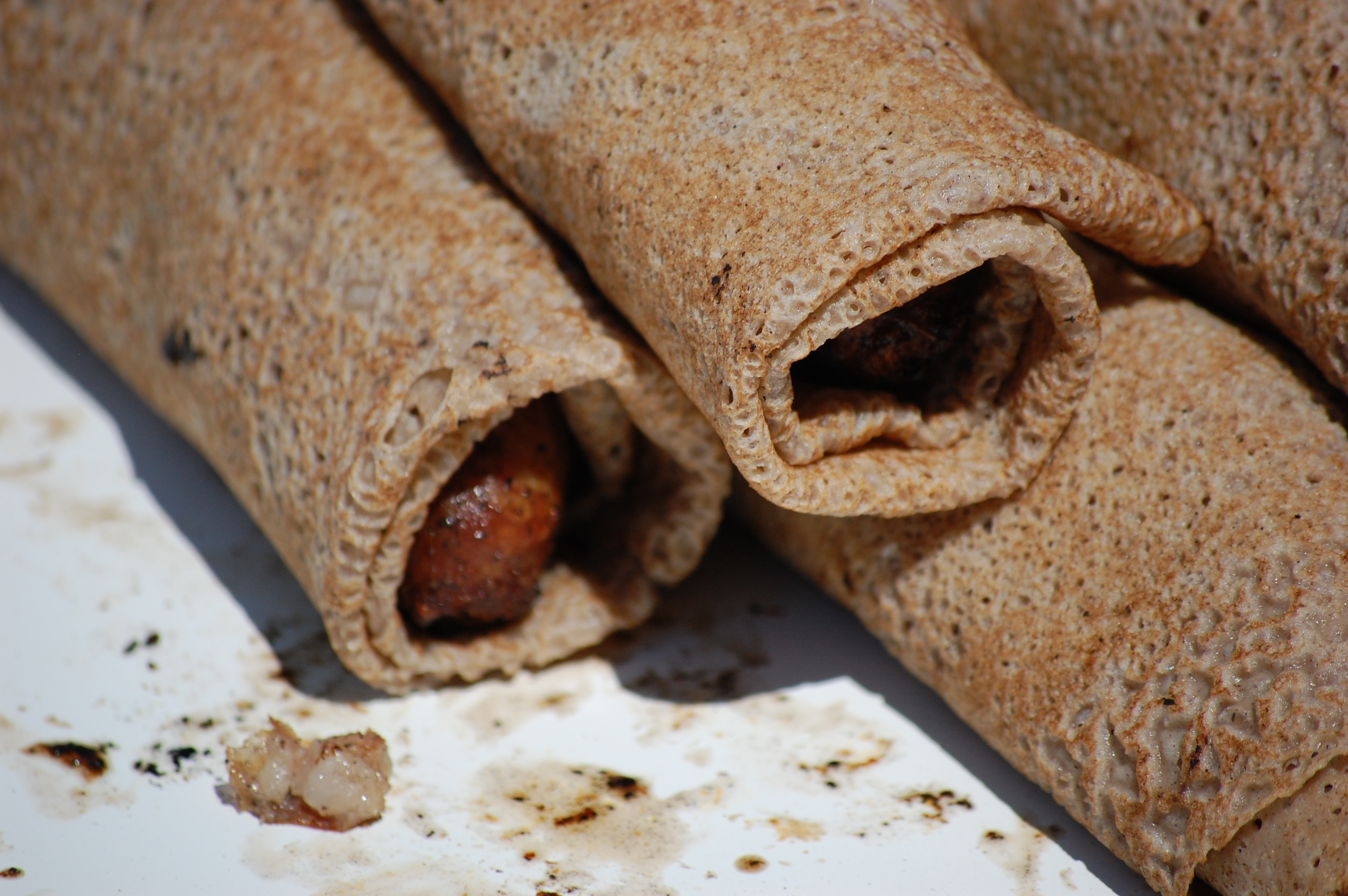
Galette-saucisse

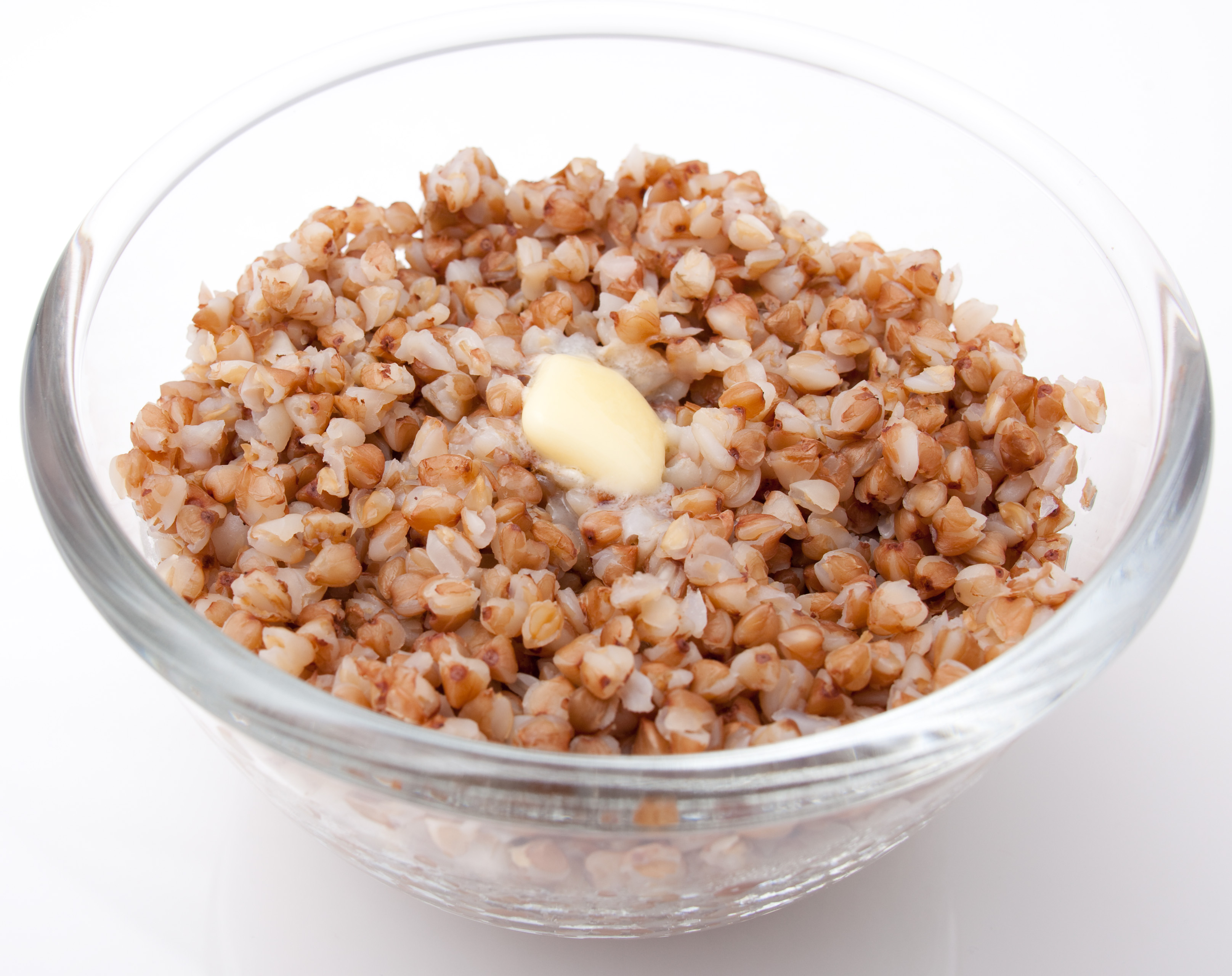
Buckwheat porridge with butter

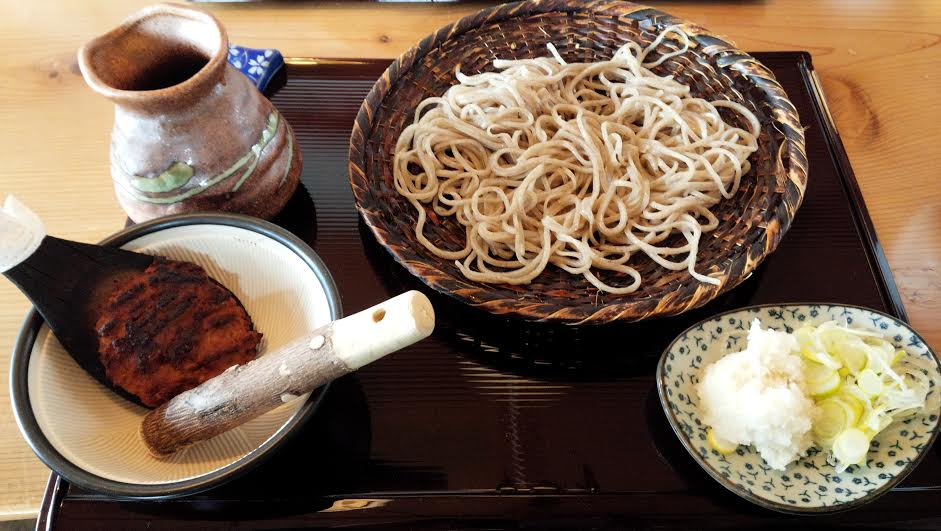
Takato soba

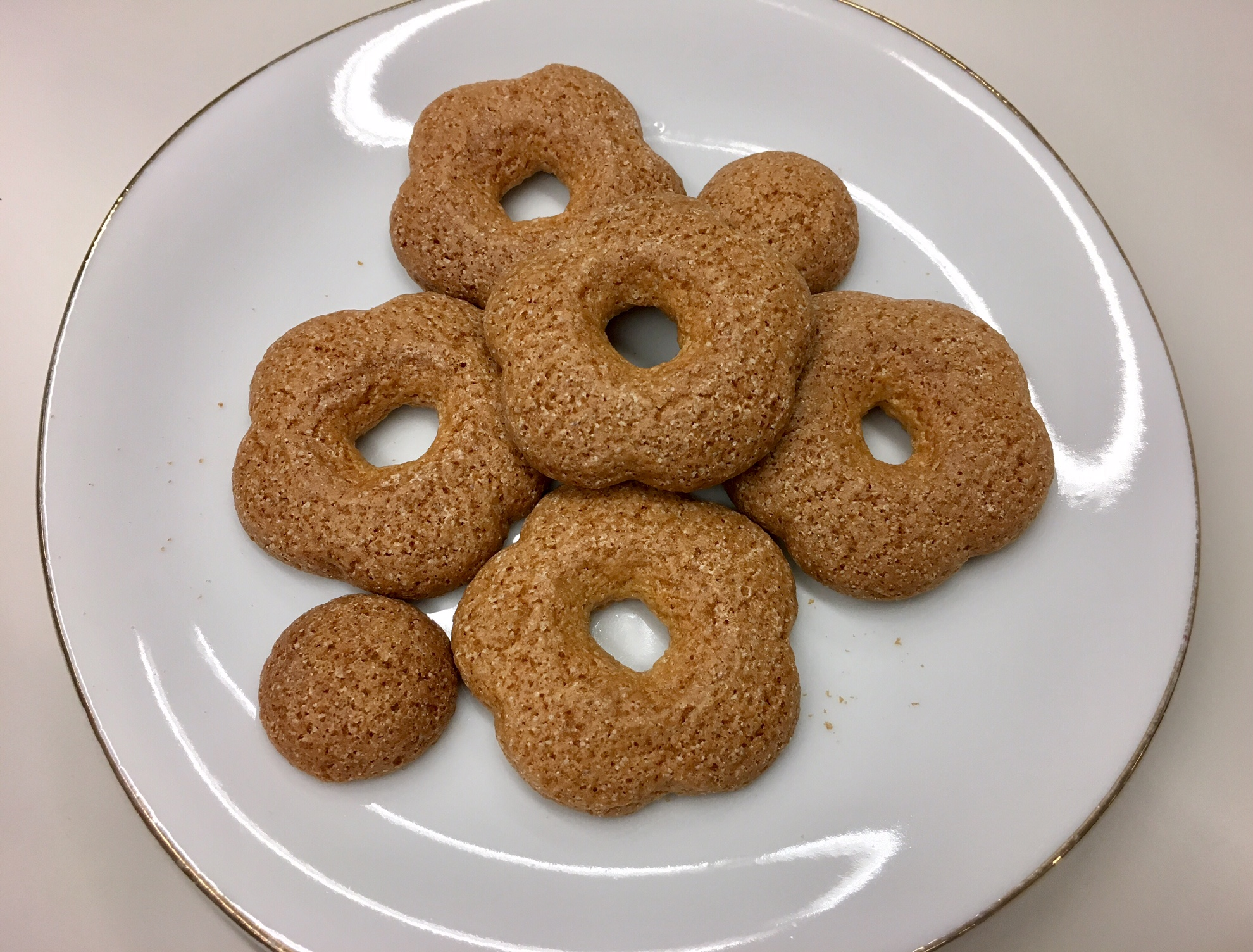
Japanese buckwheat cookies (sobabōro), a specialty of Kyoto

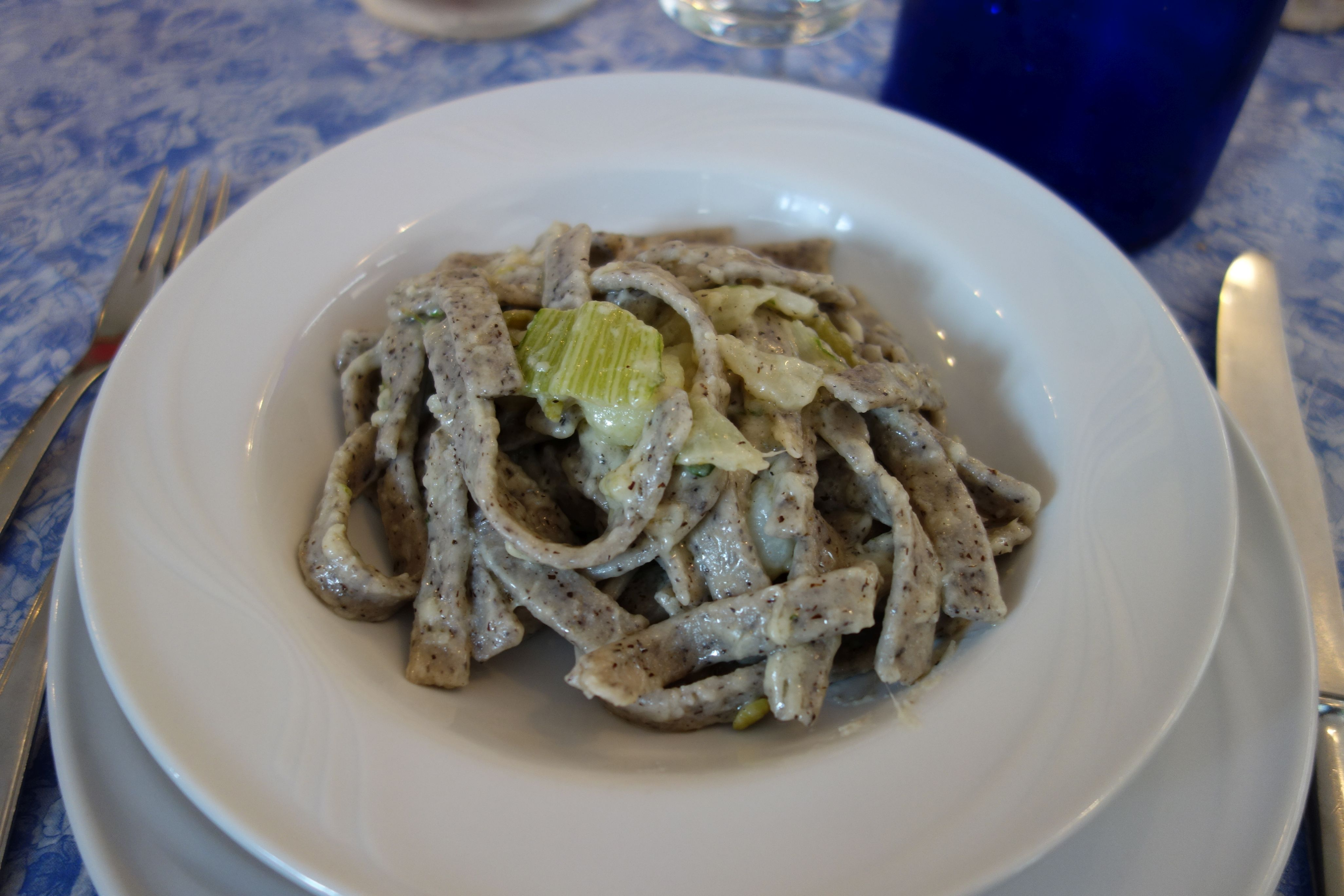
The Italian dish of Pizzoccheri

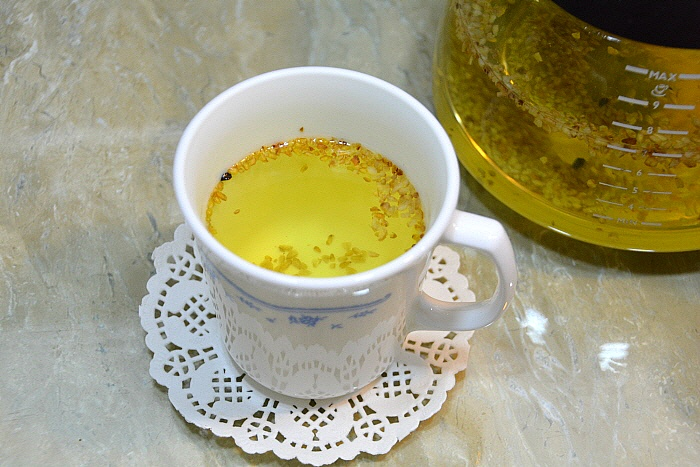
Memil-cha, a buckwheat tea

- Ajdovi žganci – translates to English as "buckwheat spoonbread". It is a national Slovene dish.
- Broeder – a traditional Dutch dish: a batter with buckwheat flour, yeast, and other ingredients is boiled in a cotton bag.
- Buchweizentorte – a layered cake that is a speciality of the Lüneburg Heath region of Lower Saxony in northern Germany.
- Buckwheat pancake

- Blini – an Eastern European pancake made with buckwheat flour.
- Crêpe bretonne – (krampouezhen in Breton) from Lower Brittany, France. When made from buckwheat flour, not wheat, a savoury pancake. Distinct from galette de sarrasin (kaletez).
- Galette de sarrasin – (kaletez in Breton) from Upper Brittany, France, a savoury pancake made from buckwheat flour. Distinct from crêpe bretonne (krampouezhen).
- Memil-buchimgae – a Korean pancake made with buckwheat flour.
- Ploye – a pancake made of buckwheat flour, wheat flour, baking powder and water popular in Southeastern Canada and Maine.

- Crozets de Savoie – small flat square-shaped pasta originally made in the Savoie region in southeast France, the crozets were traditionally made at home by housewives using buckwheat or wheat, or sometimes both.
- Galette-saucisse – a French street food item consisting of a hot sausage wrapped in a cold type of crêpe called galette de sarrasin or Breton galette. The French region known as Upper Brittany is the traditional homeland of the dish, which is prepared using buckwheat for the crêpe and pork sausage.
- Jat-guksu – a Korean noodle dish consisting of buckwheat or wheat flour noodles in a bowl of cold broth made from ground pine nuts. It is a local specialty of Gapyeong, Gyeonggi Province, South Korea.
- Kasha varnishkes – a traditional Ashkenazi Jewish dish that combines buckwheat porridge with noodles, typically farfalle (bow-tie pasta).
- Kig ha farz – a cooked dish eaten traditionally in Brittany consisting of various meats simmered in a broth with a buckwheat flour based pudding.
- Mak-guksu – a Korean buckwheat noodle dish served in a chilled broth and sometimes with sugar, mustard, sesame oil or vinegar.
- Memil-muk – a Korean dish consisting of a light gray-brown muk (jelly) made from buckwheat starch. It is commonly served as banchan (a side dish accompanying rice) as well as anju (food accompanying alcoholic drinks).
- Mezzelune – a semi-circular stuffed pasta, similar to ravioli or pierogi. The dough is usually made of white flour or buckwheat flour, durum semolina, and mixed with eggs and olive oil.
- Naengmyeon – a Korean noodle dish of long and thin handmade noodles made from the flour and starch of various ingredients, including buckwheat, potatoes, sweet potatoes, arrowroot starch and kudzu.
- Oyaki – a Japanese dumpling made from a fermented buckwheat dough wrapped around a stuffing of Japanese vegetables, fruit, or anko bean paste and then roasted on an iron pan.
- Pizzoccheri – an Italian pasta from Valtellina, Lombardy.
- Poffert – a traditional Dutch dish from Groningen; a batter containing buckwheat flour and other ingredients is cooked au bain marie in a special tin
- Poffertjes – a traditional Dutch batter treat resembling small, fluffy pancakes; they are made with yeast and buckwheat flour and have a light, spongy texture.
- Scrapple – a Pennsylvania Dutch mush of pork scraps, flour (can be wheat or buckwheat), and spices often eaten for breakfast.
- Soba – the Japanese name for buckwheat, it usually refers to thin noodles made from buckwheat flour, or a combination of buckwheat and wheat flours (nagano soba).
- Stip – a regional dish in the Dutch provinces of Groningen, Drenthe and Overijssel, it is served as buckwheat porridge with a hole containing fried bacon and a spoonful of syrup.

=== Beverages ===
- Buckwheat tea – a tea prepared using roasted buckwheat
- Buckwheat whisky – a type of distilled alcoholic beverage produced entirely or principally from buckwheat.

== See also ==
- Buckwheat § Culinary use – detailed information about buckwheat as a food source
- Buckwheat honey
- List of edible seeds
- List of poppy seed pastries and dishes
- List of sesame seed dishes
