= Ploye =

Brayon flatbread (modern-day Canada)

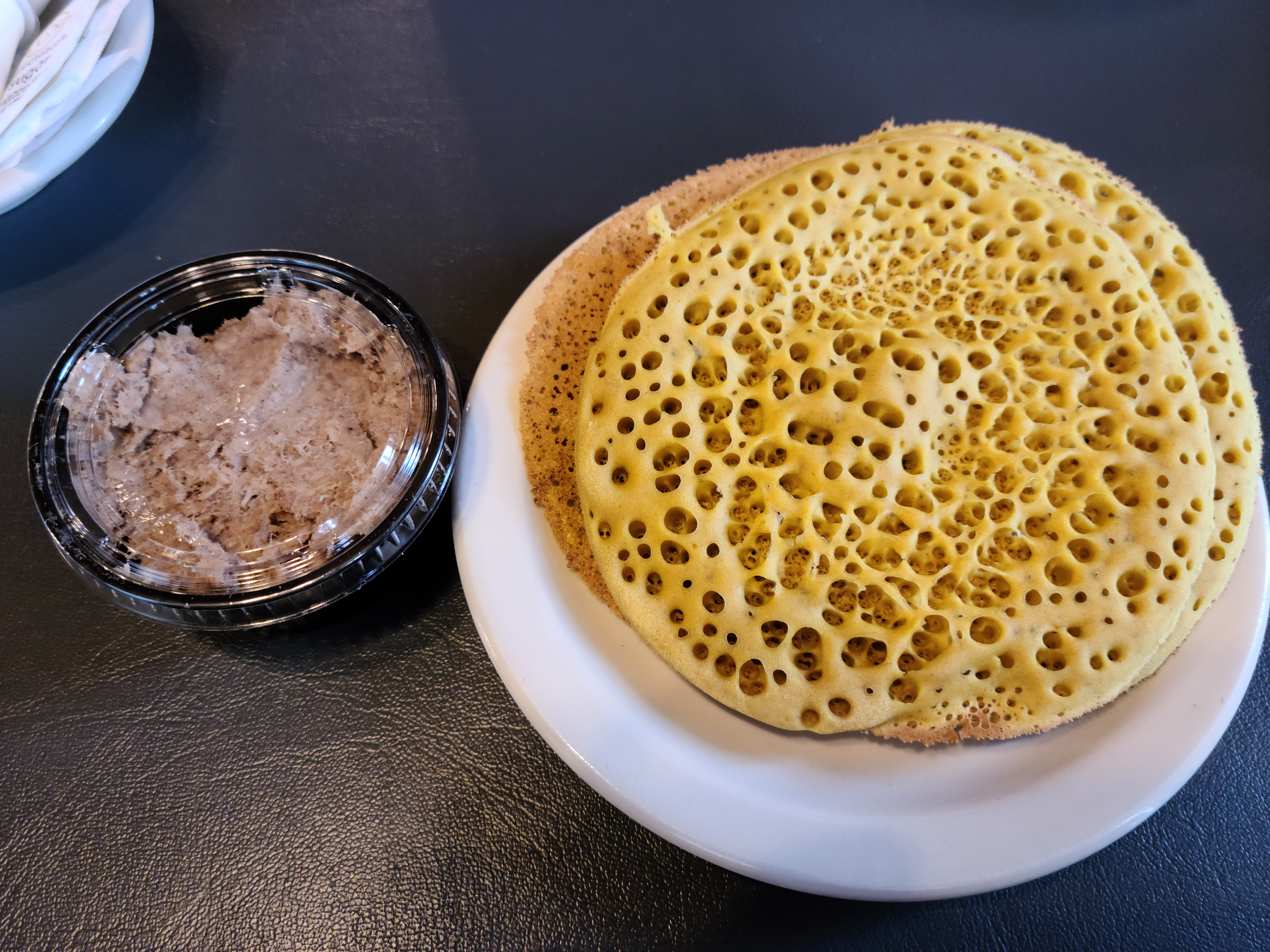
- Ployes
- Type: Flatbread
- Place of origin: Canada
- Region or state: New Brunswick
- Main ingredients: Buckwheat flour, wheat flour, baking powder, water

A ploye (/plɔɪ/, French pronunciation: [plwa]) is a Brayon flatbread type mix of buckwheat flour, wheat flour, baking powder and water which is extremely popular in the Madawaska region in New Brunswick and Maine.

First invented in Nova Scotia, they later spread to the St. John Valley and Maine.

Much like grits or potatoes, the ploye was originally a simple carbohydrate filler food for the local population. It was very cheap, easy to make, and with local toppings, such as maple syrup, brown sugar or cretons, could vary in taste. This staple is often eaten with baked beans. Over time, however, it simply became a traditional dish.

The recipe varies from family to family and is handed down through the generations. The batter itself is very thin and runny so as to ensure it does not get too thick while cooking. The ploye resembles a crêpe in thickness when cooking. In Madawaska, Maine, the ployes have a yellow colour due to the type of buckwheat used in the mixture. Recipes sometimes include a little vinegar to keep the cakes from turning red.

A ploye is only cooked on one side. Once cooked, it is buttered and covered in maple syrup, brown sugar, molasses, or cretons. It is then rolled or folded up and eaten. It is also served with the local traditional chicken stew called fricot, which more closely resembles chicken soup with homemade flour dumplings (also called sliders).

Ployes are often served at local events and fairs, such as the Ployes Festival and Foire Brayonne.

Ployes are popular with vegans because they are made without milk or eggs.

In 2016, food columnist Avery Yale Kamila wrote in the Portland Press Herald: "Made from buckwheat flour, wheat flour, salt, and a leavening agent, ployes are a griddle bread associated with the French Acadian communities of eastern Canada and northern Maine (Brayons). Though traditionally eaten with chicken stew, hot dogs, and other meat-based meals, ployes have been embraced by Maine’s vegan community."

== See also ==
- Kaletez
- List of buckwheat dishes
- Memil-buchimgae
- Crumpets
