= À Distance =

Studio album by Marie-Chantal Toupin
- Released: September 30, 2008
- Genre: Pop
- Length: 40:07
- Label: EDC Musique
- Producer: Guy Tourville

Marie-Chantal Toupin chronology
Non-Négociable (2005)	À Distance (2008)	Noël C'est L'amour (2009)

À Distance is the fifth album by Canadian singer Marie-Chantal Toupin. It was released on September 30, 2008.

== Track listing ==
Source: iTunes

No.	Title	Lyrics	Music	Length
1.	"À distance"	Karine Nguyen, Claude Senécal	Karine Nguyen, Claude Senécal	3:36
2.	"Apprends-moi"	Claude Senécal	Claude Senécal	3:21
3.	"Nous deux"	Hervé Desbois, Claude Senécal	Hervé Desbois, Claude Senécal	3:42
4.	"Si je pouvais"	Paul Daraîche, Claude Senécal	Paul Daraîche, Claude Senécal	4:07
5.	"Comme un homme"	Claude Senécal, Marie-Chantal Toupin	Claude Senécal	3:20
6.	"Tu verras bien"	Hervé Desbois, Claude Senécal	Claude Senécal	3:05
7.	"Une fois pour toutes"	Claude Senécal	Claude Senécal	3:59
8.	"Pas facile"	Marjolène Morin, Pascal Mailloux	Pascal Mailloux, Jean-Pierre Limoges	3:55
9.	"Celui que je veux"	Gildas Arzel, Nanette Workman	Gildas Arzel, Nanette Workman	4:10
10.	"Marchons seul"	Claude Senécal	Claude Senécal	3:10
11.	"La guerre est finie"	Christian Sbrocca, Richard Turcotte	Christian Sbrocca, Richard Turcotte	3:37
