= Galette-saucisse =

French street food

Galette saucisse
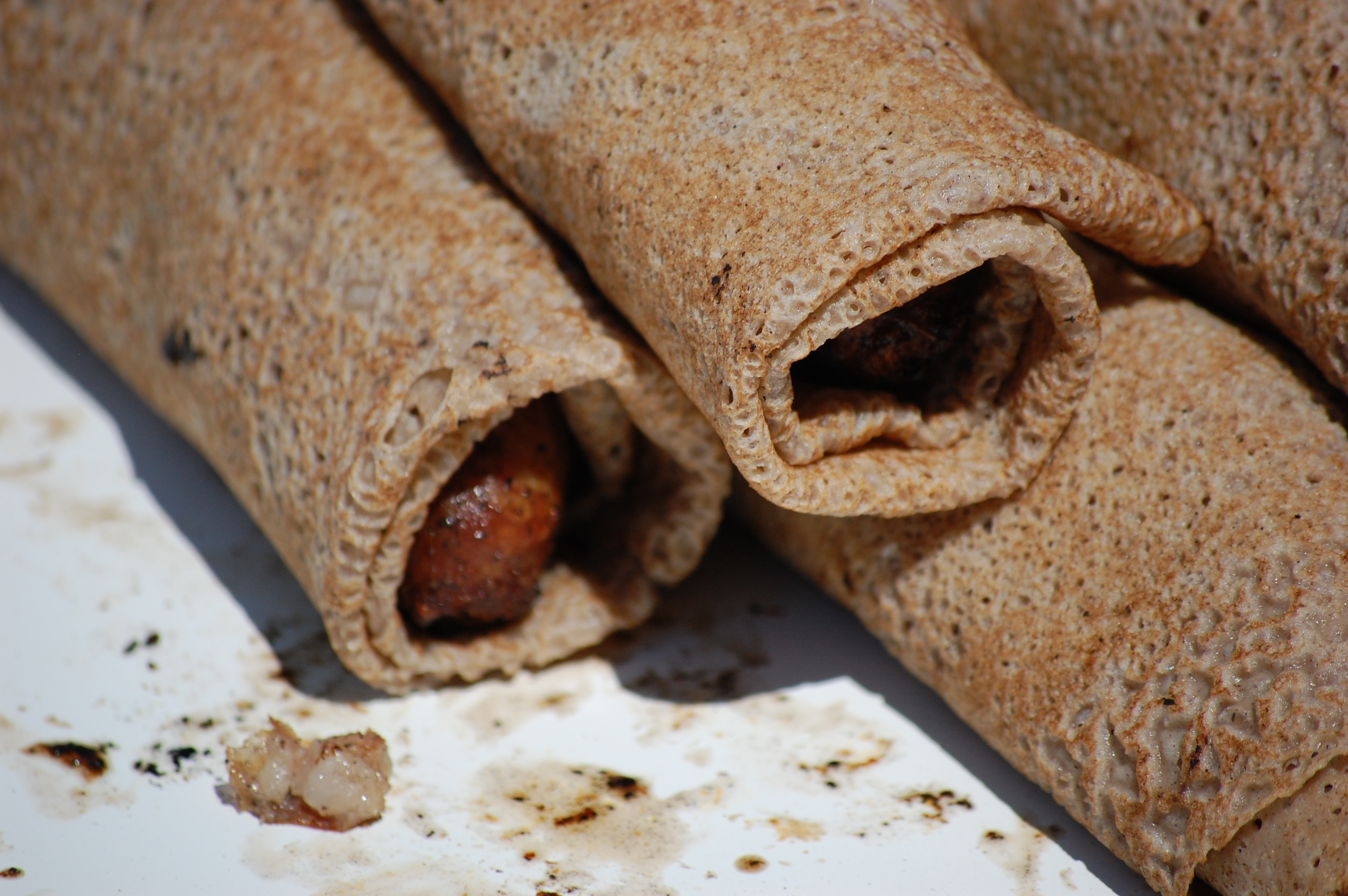
- A traditional galette-saucisse consisting of a cooked sausage wrapped in a galette
- Alternative names: Robiquette
- Place of origin: France
- Region or state: Upper Brittany
- Serving temperature: Hot
- Main ingredients: Pork sausage and breton galette

A galette-saucisse (Breton: kaletez gant silzig) is a type of French street food item consisting of a hot sausage, traditionally grilled, wrapped in a buckwheat crepe called galette de sarrasin or Breton galette. The French region known as Upper Brittany is the traditional homeland of galette-saucisse, especially the department of Ille-et-Vilaine and some parts of its bordering departments like Côtes-d'Armor, Morbihan, Loire-Atlantique, Mayenne and Manche.

First created during the 19th century, the dish consists of two landmark food items of the cuisine of Brittany. Buckwheat, introduced in Brittany during the 15th century and largely cultivated in the region, is the main ingredient of Breton galette and was a common substitute for bread in poor families. Pork sausage is one of the food specialties of the Rennes area.

Galette-saucisse is very popular in Upper Brittany, especially at outdoor public events, outdoor markets and sports games. It is strongly associated with the Stade Rennais F.C. football team, the dish being often eaten at Roazhon Park during football games.

== Description ==
=== Recipe ===
The essential ingredients of the galette-saucisse are:

- a type of crêpe called galette de sarrasin made from buckwheat flour, a cuisine landmark of Upper Brittany
- a cooked pork sausage composed, as some specialists recommend, of 75–80% of pork meat and 20–25% of pork fat. The pork sausage can be salted and black pepper was traditionally used for the recipe.

The galette itself is usually served cold, in order to protect the eater's hand from the hot cooked sausage, but it can be warm when crepes are freshly prepared as consumers are arriving.

=== Dressing and toppings ===
The canonical recipe of the galette-saucisse does not include any dressing, and the "French Association for the Preservation of the Galette-saucisse" recommends to not add any of them. Author of Galette-saucisse, je t'aime ! book Benjamin Keltz wrote that ketchup, mayonnaise and any other dressing are strongly seen as unacceptable.

Sausage was historically just one of the items in the galette. At the beginning of the 19th century, galette-saucisse was commonly topped with caramelized yellow onions.

== See also ==
- List of buckwheat dishes
- List of sausage dishes
