= Foire Brayonne =

Coordinates: 47.367°N 68.327°W

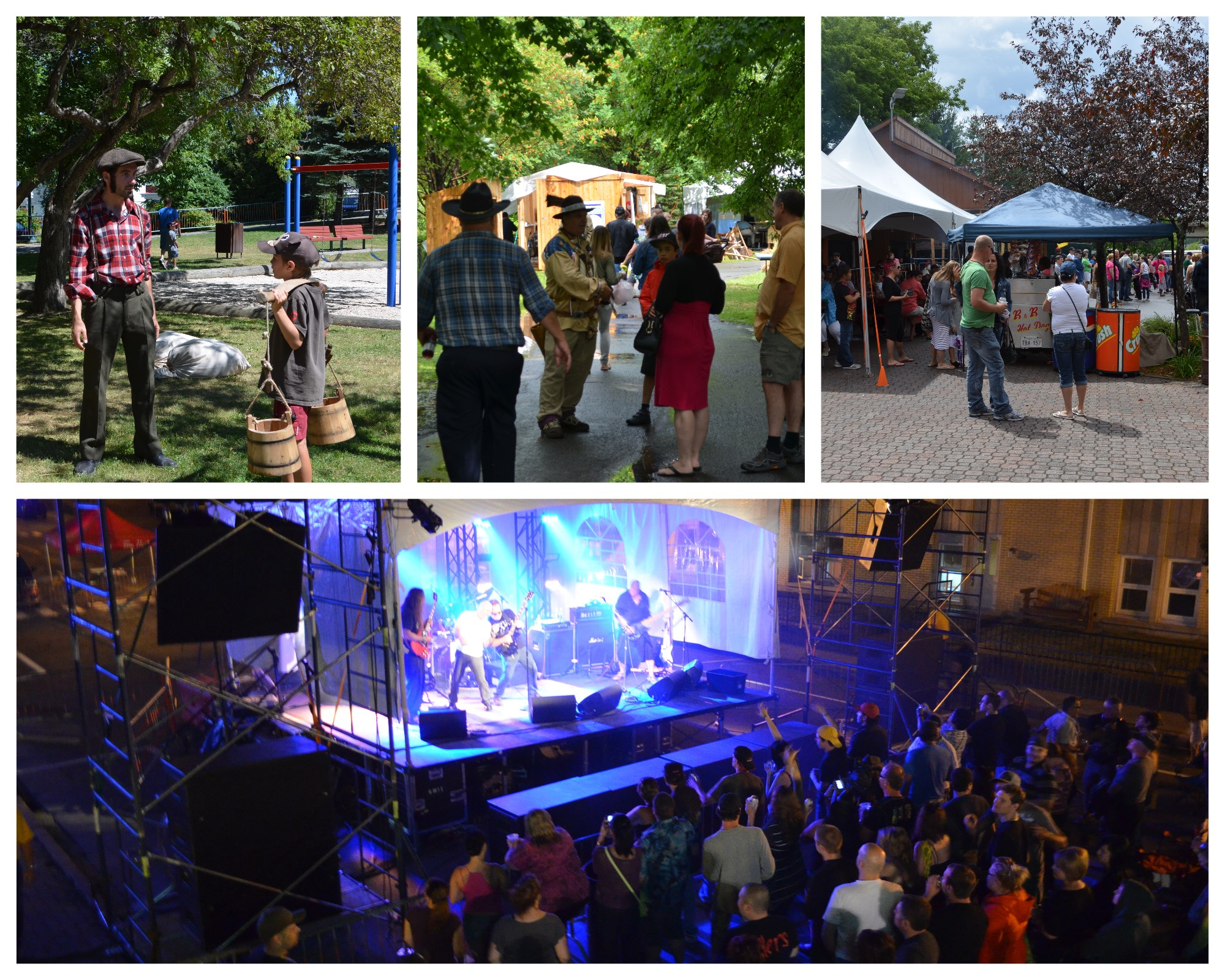

The Foire Brayonne is a music and cultural festival held each summer in Edmundston, New Brunswick since 1985. The Foire is sometimes considered the biggest French festival held in Canada outside the province of Quebec. It is usually held in August, at several locations in Edmundston.

== History ==
The first festival was held in 1978 and up to 1985 was a 10-day event. Today the festival is running strong with five days of activities for all ages. It is held the week before the New Brunswick Civic Holiday, which is the first Monday of August.

== Etymology ==
The name "Foire Brayonne" stems from the word "foire" which is French for fair. "Brayonne" is the feminine form of the French word "Brayon" which is the name given to residents of Edmundston and the surrounding Madawaska County area. There have been many disputes as to why this term is used.

The word is defined as someone who mixes (such as pancakes or laundry). However, some historians dispute the term when it comes to the people of Edmundston. They refer to their ancestors' harvesting of reeds from the Saint John River valley. These were known as "braye" (which they used to weave baskets and make brooms). Therefore, the term "brayon" means harvester of braye. Some believe the name may refer to the Pays de Bray region in Normandy (northwestern France). Having left this region for Quebec, the descendants made their way over generations to the Saint John River valley. The name perhaps provides a link to their native homeland.

== Local dishes ==
Many local dishes are served during the festival such as the ploye, which is a pancake type mix of water and buckwheat flour. There is chicken stew which is chicken mixed with dumplings and potatoes. They enjoy cretons: a pork-based pate.

Although not a local dish, there's teriyaki on a stick where a thin piece of meat is dipped into a mix of teriyaki and barbecue sauce, grilled over an open fire. It was introduced in the late 90s and has become a foire favorite.

== Major attractions ==
The foire relies on sponsorships and grants to offer a low entrance fee. A five-day pass to all shows was available for $35 (in 2014). Compared to similar festivals, the Foire is arguably one of the best deals of its kind.

People wishing to know more about the area's rich history can visit "La Promenade de la Republique", which is an exposition on how life in the area was during the Victorian era.

A large park for kids offers live shows, inflatable games, and the opportunity to paint kids' faces and have their picture taken with Typique, a child-friendly porcupine with which the region has a rich history of.

Other attractions include an outdoor mass celebrating the French culture's loyalty to the Catholic faith, a large parade, car shows, sporting competitions, and an arts and crafts flea market.

One of the Foire's major attractions has been live concerts. Here is a partial list of artists who have appeared at the Foire:

- René Simard and Nathalie Simard (1983)
- Véronique Béliveau (1985)
- The Box (1986–1987)
- Too Many Cooks (1987)
- Glass Tiger (1989)
- Celine Dion (1991)
- Julie Masse (1992)
- Les BB (1992)
- Alannah Myles (1993)
- Roch Voisine (1994)
- France D'Amour (1994 and 2013)
- Beau Dommage (1995)
- James Ledgerwood (1995)
- Kevin Parent (1995)
- Éric Lapointe (1994 and 1995)
- Moist (1997)
- Great Big Sea (1998)
- Plume Latraverse (1999)
- Claude Dubois (2000)
- Natasha St-Pier (1991 and 2003)
- Yelo Molo (2003 and 2004)
- Les Classels (2003)
- Les Respectables (2003)
- Marie-Chantal Toupin (2004 and 2010)
- Les Trois Accords (2005)
- Les Cowboys Fringants (2006)
- Hugo Lapointe (2006)
- Jonas (2006)
- Mentake (2006 and 2009)
- Marie Mai (2006)
- Soldat Louis (2007)
- Martin Fontaine (2007–2009)
- Mobile (2007)
- 1755 (2008)
- Michel Pagliaro (2009)
- Gildor Roy (2009)
- Guy A. Lepage (2009)
- Elizabeth Blouin-Braithwaite (2009)
- Tailor Made Fable (2010)
- George Belliveau (2010)
- Collective Soul (2010)
- Alchoolica (2012–2013)
- Alter Ego (2012–2013)
- Les Vickings (2013)
- Marc Dupré (2014)
- Jérôme Couture (2014)
- André-Philippe Gagnon (2014)

One of the most interesting events at the Foire Brayonne is the Party du Parking. The idea for this party was brought forward by committee member Jo-Anne Volpé, who in 1987, asked city officials about having a large party in the city's parking lot. Despite their reservations, city officials agreed. Today, more than 20 years later, the Party du Parking is one of the most enduring and successful events of the Foire Brayonne. Hundreds of people from all walks of life come to this event simply to experience it, as it has a large word-of-mouth and cult following.

Every year thousands of people gather on the Friday evening of the Foire in the parking lot in downtown Edmundston. Food, beverages, and live entertainment is offered. Although sometimes imitated by other festivals in the United States and Canada, it is the largest one of its kind in New Brunswick. It has sometimes been compared to Mardi Gras due to its large gathering and party atmosphere. What makes the Party du Parking so special is that, despite having thousands of people gathered into one small spot, the party is in a very controlled environment. Very few, if any, arrests are made and almost everyone attending the Party du Parking are well behaved, despite the amount of alcohol people tend to consume on that night.

== Dispute ==
The Foire Brayonne is sometimes criticized by the Acadian people as not promoting the culture as a vital part of French New Brunswick, as most of them feel that the term Brayons is but a legend. Despite this the foire has always included Acadian acts and encourages local Acadian talent. In 2008 the foire's closing festivities added an Acadian touch with 1755 and Le Grand Dérangement. Fayo and George Belliveau are some of the Acadian acts who performed.

The Edmundston area, despite having a large population of Acadian ancestry, has always been a separate culture from the rest of French New Brunswick. It has become the second largest majority French speaking city outside of Quebec. Most of the francophones there are from Quebec ancestry, compared to the rest of French New Brunswick which are direct descendants of the first French people to colonise North America in 1604 in what is now Nova Scotia and New Brunswick. Quebec was not founded until four years later.

Because of the high Quebec ancestry in the Edmundston area and its close proximity to the Quebec border, area residents are in some cases considered by Acadians as non-resident Quebecers.

Some "Brayons" do not want to be compared to Acadians or Quebecers and ardently call themselves independent "Brayons" from "P'tit Sault" (the original name for Edmundston), which designates the smaller rapids of the river.

== Foire directors ==
- Lise Bourgoin 1990–2001
- Cindy Couturier 2001–2006
- Guillaume L'Italien 2006–2008
- Éric Thériault 2008–2011

The current director is Cindy Couturier.
