= Stip =

Stip or STIP may refer to:

== Places ==
- Štip Municipality, Macedonian municipality
  - Štip, the largest town in the eastern part of the Republic of Macedonia

== Law ==
- Stipendiary magistrate, magistrates in receipt of a stipend
- Stipulation, an agreement, in American law

== Other uses ==
- Kees Stip (1913–2001)
- Short-Term Income Protection
- SINQ Target Irradiation Program
- Stip (dish), a regional dish in the Dutch provinces of Groningen, Drenthe and Overijssel
- Studenten Techniek In Politiek, local political party
- Stip (geometry)
- Short term incentive plan, see Executive compensation
- Stand-in processing
