= Pascal Mailloux =

Canadian musical artist (born 1957)

- Born: 5 May 1957 (age 69); Granby, Quebec, Canada
- Genres: Classical, jazz, novelty
- Occupations: Composer, pianist
- Instruments: Piano; Keyboard
- Years active: 1980–present

Pascal Mailloux (born 5 May 1957) is a Francophone Canadian pianist.

== Biography ==
Pascal started his professional piano career in 1980, with his first band Leyden zar, where he was a composer, keyboardist, and singer. Pascal has been playing piano since he was a 5-year-old, and studied piano for 10 years with the Vincent d"indy school, later at the age of 17 [1975 to 1977] Pascal studied at the Sherbrooke music college, Quebec, Canada

== Pascal and Marjo ==
Pascal worked together with Marjo on many albums, out of which Marjo sold over 1 million albums throughout his career. In 1985–90 Another album "she who goes" by Marjo and Composition of the song The one that goes "At the end of heaven", in 2003:Composition and Recording the album turquoise Marjo

== Discography ==
- 1980–85: Leyden Zar with André Perry
- 1989–90: Album Marjo As long as there are children(250,000 copies sold)
- Recording of album Nanette Workman with "Luc Plamondon"
- Composition of the theme song "As long as there are children"

== Television, cinema, advertising and shows ==
- 2009: Spectacle Bénéfice & Les yeux du cœur, with Laurence Jalbert, Florence k, Jonathan Painchaud, Bob Walsh & Manon d'Inverness"
- 2008: Composition of Song for Marie-Chantal Toupin "It's not easy"
- 2008: Spectacle Bénéfice,& Benefit Concert "The eyes of the heart" with Marjo, Nanette Workman, Boom Desjardins & Mélanie Renaud'
- 2007: Music series "Mon œil Pour zone3"
- 2006: Advertisements in Hyundai
- 2005: Recording & Registration With Various Artists & shows throughout Quebec
- 2004–06: Quebec Tour with Marjo & Tribute Show at Francofolies Montreal
- 2002: Documentary, Italy-Canada
- 2001: Music composer of Américan One Way Out with James Belushi
- 1999: Series "The big fears of 2000" with Simon Durivage, Motion International Production, dissemination vat
- 1998-00: Séries Documentary Ecce homo des productions Coscient
- 1995: Advertising International Player's racing cars with Jacques Villeneuve advertising
- 2001: Sans retour
- 2005: Turquoise
- Bachelor Theme – Production Zone 3 Tqs
- Free Tour to Pixcom
- Prod Pixcom Theme music for Radio Canada "37.5"
- Love Hurts theme song & Music Theme "Bread of Love"for TV-Quebec
- Channel-life theme: Eros & Company & Hello Doctor "Canal life theme"
- Radio-Canada theme: Olive and Papaya & Attention is Hot
- Theme of the "Love"
- Theme of the Costs to the 400 TV-Quebec
- Series Love Hurts, production zone 3, T
- "The last game of life" for VAT with Claude Charron
- "Origins" documentary series Historia
- "News of God" for Tele-Quebec
- "Rona my house" vat produced by Zone 3
- kids series "Geo-chip" with Marie-Michèle Desrosiers

== Tours ==
- Canadian tour with the group "Leyden zar"
- François guy tour Musical
- Tour with Shawn Phillips
- Theater tour of 1979 with a Granby
- Geneviève Tour
- "Go Gentle" tour with Gerry Boulet
- Tour France with different artists

== Awards ==
- Winner of the "Spirit" on CHOM-FM
