= Boerenjongens =

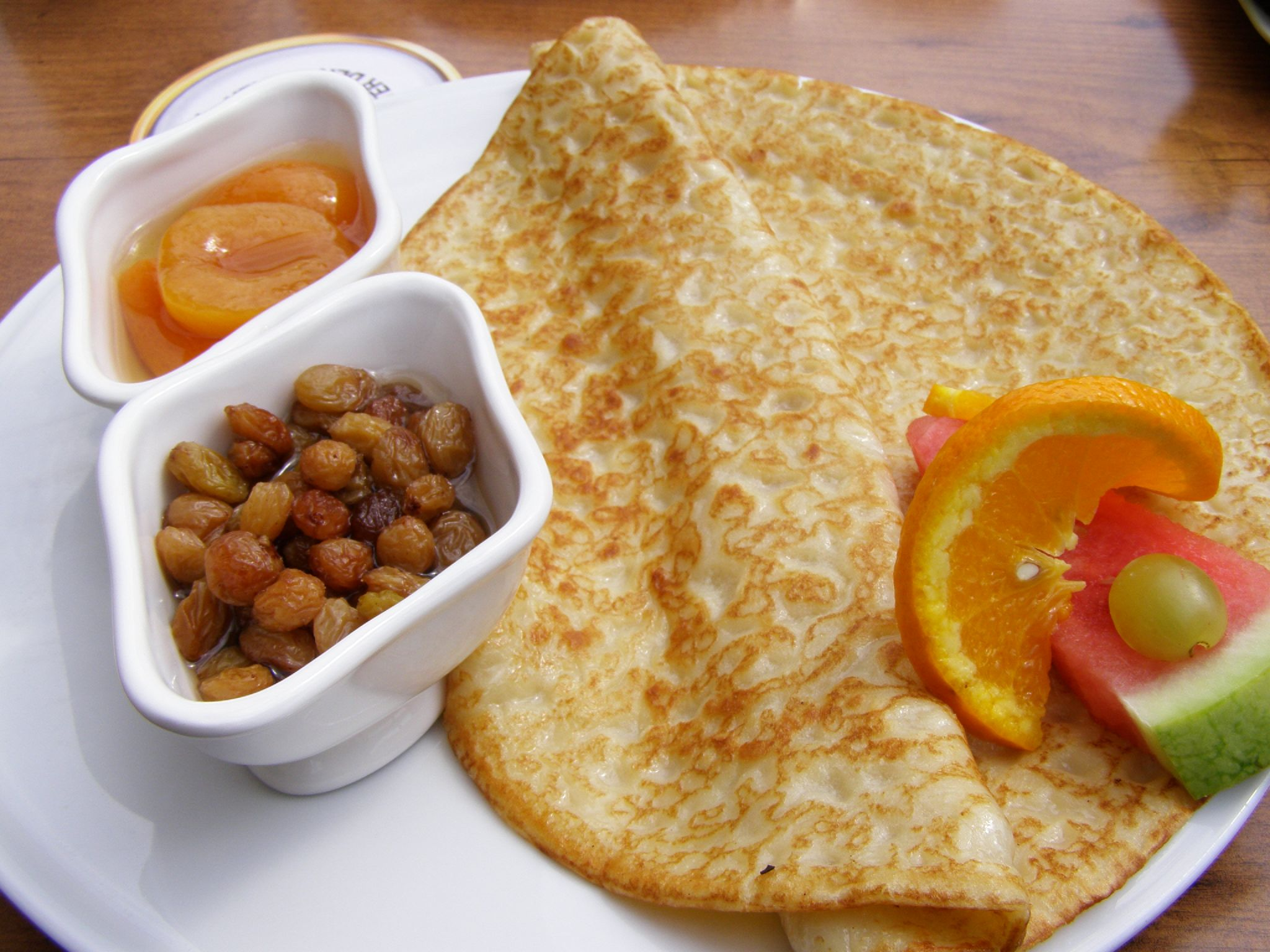
- Pancake served with boerenjongens
- Place of origin: Netherlands
- Main ingredients: Raisins, brandy
- Variations: Boerenmeisjes

Boerenjongens (Dutch pronunciation: [ˌbuːrəˈjɔŋə(n)s] or [ˌbuːrəˈɲɔŋə(n)s]) is a Dutch dish of raisins soaked in brandy. The name means "farmer boys" in Dutch. This recipe is traditionally consumed at holidays or birthdays, and is often a topping option at pancake restaurants. In the city of Groningen and other cities in the countryside like Enschede there is often boerenjongens-flavoured ice cream for sale.

In America, it is sometimes made with whiskey instead of brandy.

A variation to this recipe, apricots in brandewijn, is called boerenmeisjes (English: farmer girls).
