= Broeder =

Traditional Dutch dish

Broeder (also known as Jan in de Zak and pork) is a traditional Dutch dish whose central ingredient is buckwheat flour.

== Name ==
Broeder is the Dutch word for brother; this is how the dish is commonly known in West-Friesland. "Jan in de zak", or "John in a bag", refers to the cooking method: the batter is boiled or steamed in a cotton bag; the name is attested in West-Friesland and Drenthe. The word "pork", attested in Drenthe and Twente as a name for the dish, also means "small child".

== Ingredients and preparation ==
The dish, which is also described as a "cooked bread", is made with buckwheat flour, wheat flour, eggs, salt, and milk, and leavened with yeast. Raisins, currants, and succade are frequent additions. The batter is poured into a cotton bag (usually a pillow case), whose inside is floured lightly; the bag is closed and then cooked in a pot of boiling water. When done, it is sliced and served with butter and syrup.

The dish resembles kig ha farz, a dish from Brittany, which differs from broeder mostly in the addition of a piece of meat.

== See also ==
- List of buckwheat dishes
- Breudher
