= Breudher =

Sri Lankan baked good

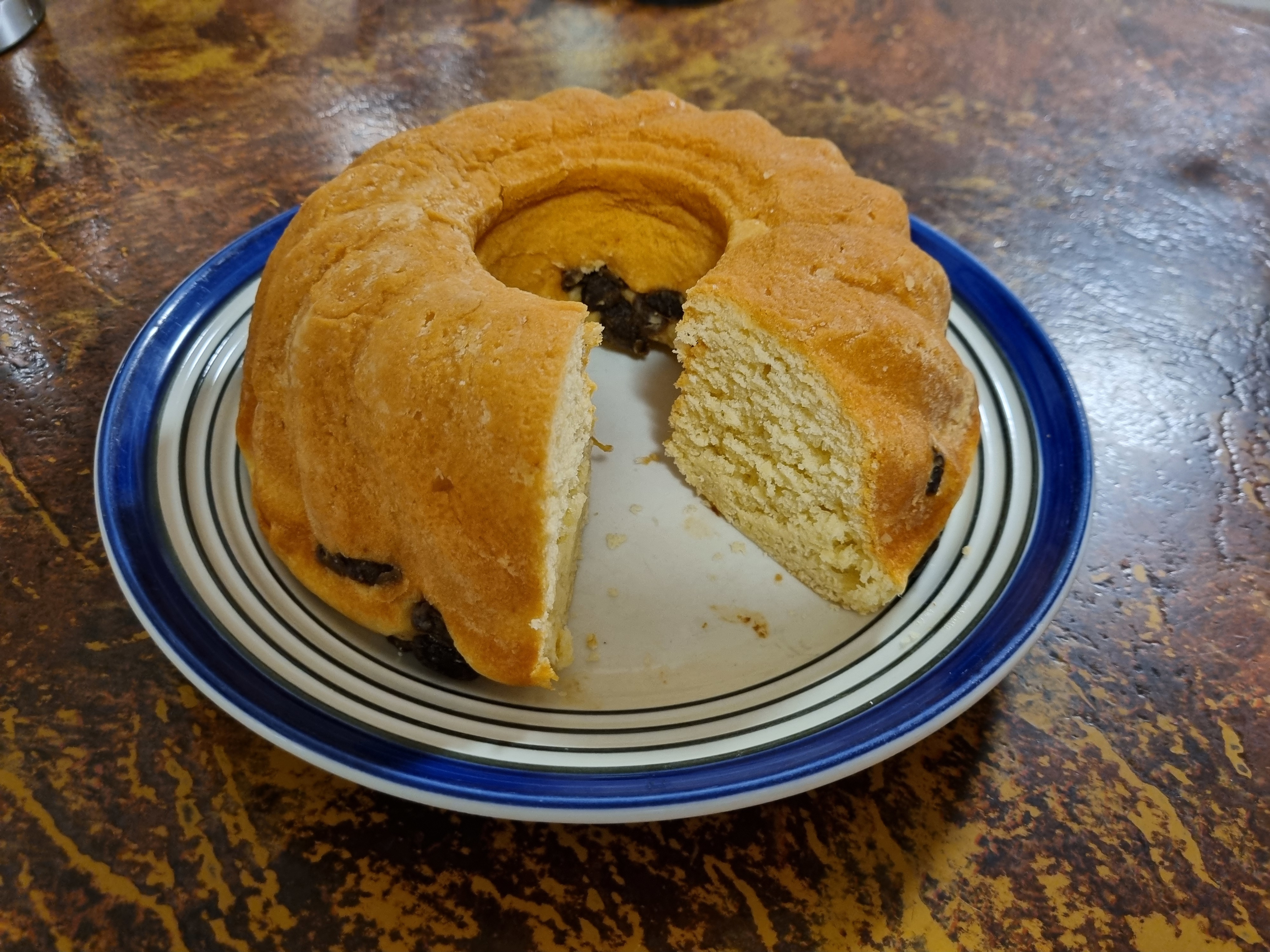
- Alternative names: Breuder, Bloeder
- Type: Cake
- Place of origin: Sri Lanka
- Main ingredients: yeast, eggs, butter, sugar, nutmeg, raisins
- Food energy (per serving): 100 kcal (420 kJ)

Breudher (pronounced broo-dhuh), also known as Brueder or Bloeder, is a traditional Sri Lankan Dutch Burgher buttery yeast cake, baked in a fluted mould. A variation, bleuda, kueh bleuda or kue bludder, is also found in the Malacca Dutch Eurasian community and in Kochi, a city in the south-west of India.

The mould used to bake the breudher is typically a heavy brass or iron mould with deep groves with a tube in the centre, so that when the cake is baked, it comes out in a grooved ring shape with a central cylindrical hole.

Each family has its own variation, but essentially the recipe consists of butter, sugar, eggs, bread dough, milk, nutmeg and raisins/sultanas. The end product is a bread like cake with a slight yeasty taste.

Breudher is traditionally served at Christmas breakfast, and New Years Day, cut into slices, spread with butter and topped with Dutch Edam cheese or fruit, such as green skinned bananas.

The difference in the recipe between the Sri Lanka Dutch Burgher and the Malacca Dutch Eurasian community, is that the Malaccan version uses toddy (fermented sap from the flower of the coconut tree) instead of yeast. It is likely that toddy was used as a local substitute when yeast was difficult to source. In Cochin bakers use maida flour, ghee (instead of butter), candied orange peel, a blend of ground spices and serve it as a bread loaf. Traditionally the local Anglo-Indian community serve it as part of breakfast during a wake, seven days after a funeral.

== Origin ==
Breudher originated from traditional Dutch broeder cake. The name derives from the Dutch word broeder, referring to the bag (broederzak) in which the cake is cooked.

Breudher is most likely to have originated from traditional Dutch breakfast cakes and breads, such as Ontbijtkoek or the German Kugelhupf. Singaporean food writer, Sylvia Tan, in Forgotten Foods and Mealtime Memories, published by the National Library Board, suggests that breudher is a derivative of "the Dutch word brood-tulband, referring to the fluted turban-shaped mould used to make it". Brood-tulband literally translates to ‘bread turban’, a description of its peculiar shape. The flute turban-shaped breudher cake has all the ingredients which were commonly used in Dutch East Indies households: butter, sugar, eggs and spices. The most distinctive ingredients are the nutmeg and egg yolks, and some of the spices.

The Malacca Portuguese Eurasians claim it as originating from their community, which is said to be a traditional Malacca Portuguese cake. However, there was a significant emigration of Ceylonese Burghers to Malacca in the early 1900s who brought with them their food and customs, assimilating into the local Eurasian community. It is generally concluded that "breudher" originated from the Dutch and that the Portuguese "blueda" is derived from the Dutch version.

== See also ==
- Butter cake
- Pound cake
- Bundt cake
- Love cake
- Broeder
