= Jat-guksu =

Korean noodle dish in pine nut broth

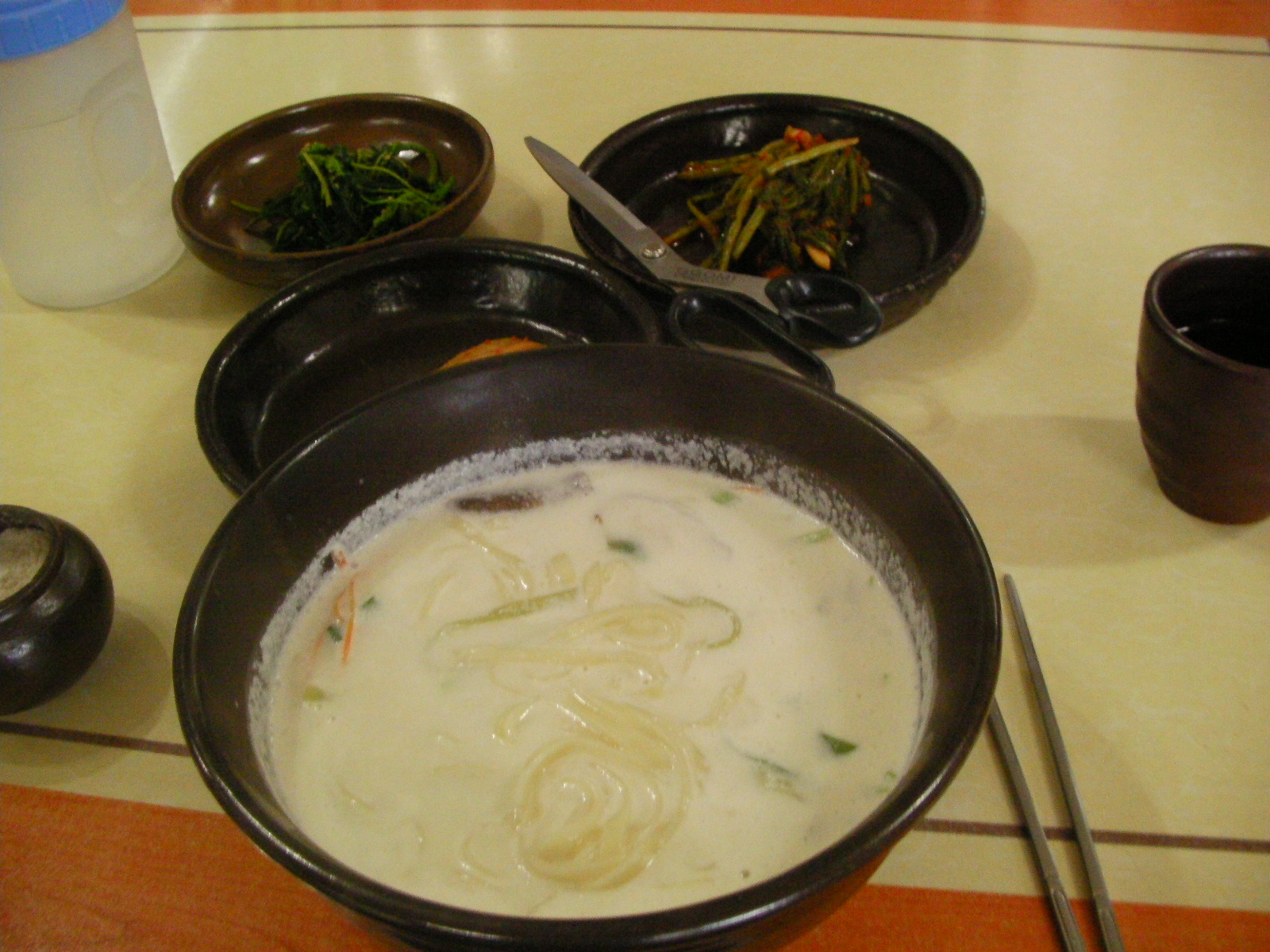
- Type: Guksu
- Place of origin: Korea
- Region or state: Gyeonggi region
- Serving temperature: cold
- Main ingredients: Noodles (wheat or buckwheat), broth (pine nuts)

Korean name
- Hangul: 잣국수
- RR: jatguksu
- MR: chatkuksu
- IPA: [tɕat̚.k͈uk̚.s͈u]

Jat-guksu (잣국수; lit. '"pine nut noodles"') is a Korean noodle dish consisting of wheat flour or buckwheat noodles in a bowl of cold broth made from ground pine nuts. It is a local specialty of Gapyeong, Gyeonggi Province, where a great deal of pine nuts are harvested in South Korea. The recipe is quite similar to another summer dish, kong-guksu, which is a noodle dish with a soy milk broth, but jat-guksu has a cleaner and more savory taste.

== See also ==
- Jatjuk
- List of buckwheat dishes
- List of Korean dishes
