= Poffert =

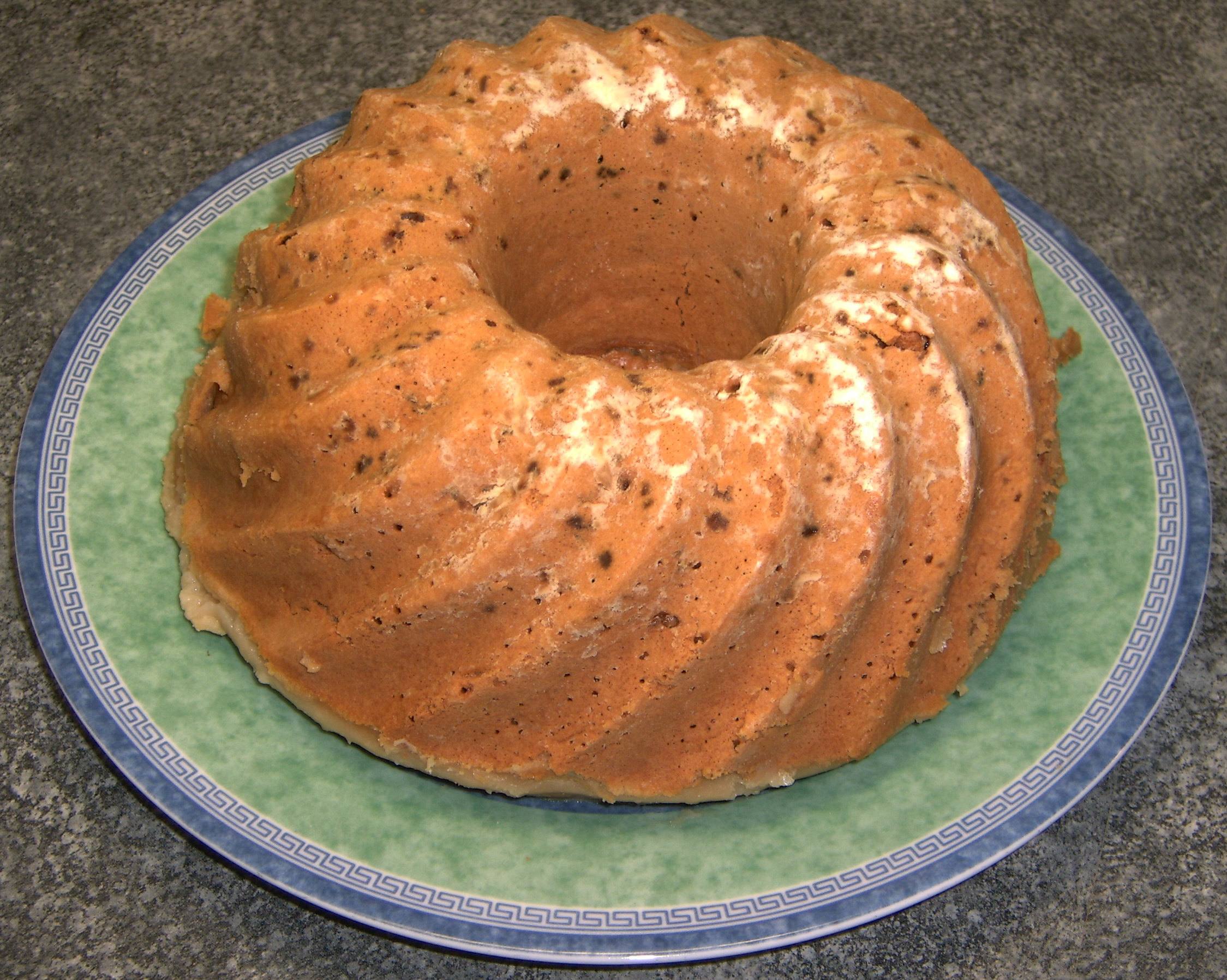
- Place of origin: Netherlands
- Region or state: Groningen

Poffert (Dutch: [ˈpɔfərt]; Gronings: povvert), also known as trommelkoek or ketelkoek, is a dish from the province of Groningen in the Netherlands. It is traditionally made with wheat flour, buckwheat flour, yeast, currants, raisins, milk, eggs, and salt. The batter is cooked au bain-marie (a water bath) in a special tin.

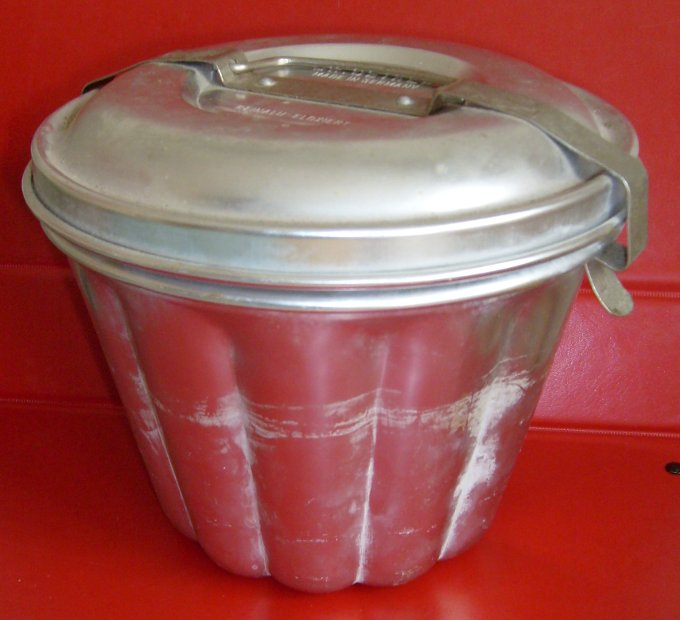
A poffert tin
