= Kig ha farz =

French meat pudding dish

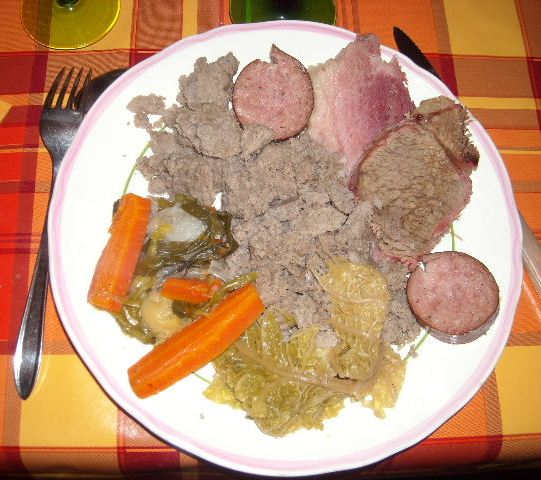
- A traditional serving of kig ha farz
- Type: Stew
- Place of origin: Bro-Leon
- Region or state: Brittany
- Main ingredients: Meat, broth, pudding (buckwheat flour)

Kig ha farz is a cooked dish consisting of various meats simmered in a broth with a buckwheat flour-based pudding. It is eaten traditionally in Brittany, more specifically around Léon in the region situated west from Morlaix to Brest. This dish, which is similar to a pot-au-feu, was once considered a dish for the poor and the peasantry. The name in Breton literally means "meat and stuffing".

The cooking broth contains meats such as salted pork knuckles and beef along with vegetables such as carrots and cabbage. These ingredients are simmered together with a cylindrical cloth bag filled with a mixture of eggs, milk, and buckwheat flour (known locally as "black wheat") for several hours. The cloth sac containing the cooked buckwheat pudding (farz) is usually rolled and the contents broken up before serving. The dish is presented with the cooked meats and vegetables and the farz is consumed with a sauce locally known as lipig, made with melted butter, bacon, and shallots.

A variation of the buckwheat farz is a "white" farz (far gwinizh) made using wheat flour, and preferred by children due to its light and sweet flavour. The white wheat-based farz is also eaten in slices pan-fried with butter (farz fritet).

== History ==
Although numerous palynological traces are attested for the ancient and medieval era, buckwheat, originating in Asia, appears in Breton and Norman texts from the end of the 15th century. It quickly becomes popular in the poor lands of inland Brittany due to its rapid growth (four months) and high yield, replacing wheat as a staple food in Bas-Léon. "The part of Brittany where Breton is spoken lives on buckwheat flour pancakes," wrote Stendhal. This allowed the marketing of wheat and ensured a certain prosperity in Brittany. By providing the population with a correct diet, buckwheat was probably no stranger to the population growth in Brittany in the 19th century.

Until the Revolution, the obligation to use communal ovens and to pay taxes restricted the method of cooking farz to cooking in a bag, thus remaining the only type of farz until the 19th century. As early as 1732, Grégoire de Rostrenen, in his dictionary, defined the word fars as "farce cooked in a bag in the pot to eat with meat in the manner of Léon". In all the houses of the country of Léon, one found bags to make farz (the production using finely sewn linen, the seams on the outside, were in the program of the domestic course of Saint-Pol-de-Léon, before marriage). In some parts of Cornouaille, it is called farz poch or farz mañch, a farz cooked in a pocket or an old shirt sleeve, respectively. Sack cooking is more common on islands or in poor, deforested areas. Claude Grassineau-Alasseur once wrote in the book Briérons: "In Brière, we often ate grou, the equivalent of Breton kig ha farz; to the vegetables of the pot-au-feu we add a piece of bacon and a porridge of buckwheat which we put in a small canvas bag; when cooked, this porridge forms a mass and can be cut into slices". This type of mixture cooked inside an envelope is known in other French regions (e.g. as farcis in Poitou, farcidure in Limousin, farcement in Savoie (farçon à la tasque)) and elsewhere in Europe (e.g. broeder or Jan-in-de-zak in the Netherlands).

In the middle of the 19th century, the vegetable boom in the agricultural economy, thanks to marine amendments, gave far en sac its current form. The farz sac'h, cooked on its own or with bacon, is used to feed the agricultural workers, in particular the day laborers whom the peasant will hire every morning in the square of Saint-Pol-de-Léon and who are called plasennerien, those space. The vegetables used for the Sunday kig ha farz (very often cooked during mass) come from the courtil, the liorzh, the garden near the house. The Sunday lunch included a fatty soup (an drusañ, ar gwellañ "the fatter, the better"), meat (shank and exceptionally beef) and farz. The leftovers made it possible to make several other meals: the broth was used to dip bread soup or make flour soups, the sliced farz was fried in the fat or better in the butter (farz fritet). We served the exceptional kig-ha-farz with lipig, a sauce prepared with Roscoff pink onions melted in butter. This Breton word is associated with the pleasure of eating and eating fat: someone who was greedy was described as a fat mouth, beg lipous or a paw-licker, lip e baw, which also designates a cake in cape Sizun.

This national Léonard dish allows the Léonard population to gather together often, a convivial means of financing activities; in 1982, the kig ha farz of Plouescat brought together more than a thousand guests. It is in Léon that this culinary tradition remains most alive, although since the 1970s kig ha farz has tended to spread beyond its original Léonard region. It was the Breton associations, particularly in Paris (cf. the Ti Jos crêpe restaurant in Montparnasse) and in the big cities, which popularized a name and a recipe that had hitherto been family-run and local.

== See also ==
- Far Breton
- List of stews
