= Kaletez =

Breton buckwheat pancake

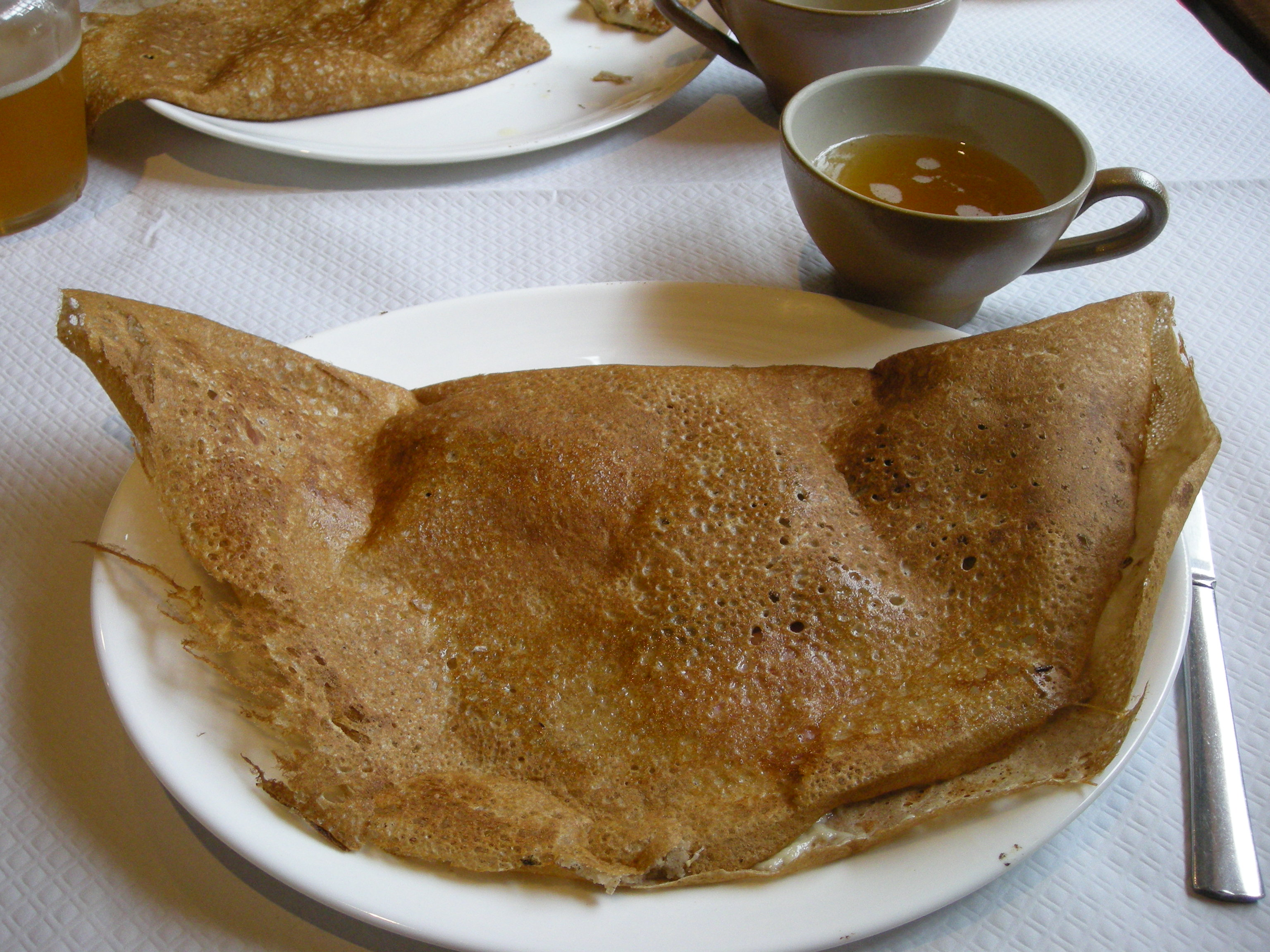
- Traditional buckwheat pancake with a cup of cider
- Place of origin: France
- Region or state: Brittany

Kaletez, called galette de sarrasin in French, is a buckwheat pancake in Breton cuisine.

== See also ==
- Blini – Eastern European thicker buckwheat pancake
- Galette
- List of buckwheat dishes
- Memil-buchimgae – Korean buckwheat pancake
