= Marie-Chantal Toupin =

Canadian musical artist

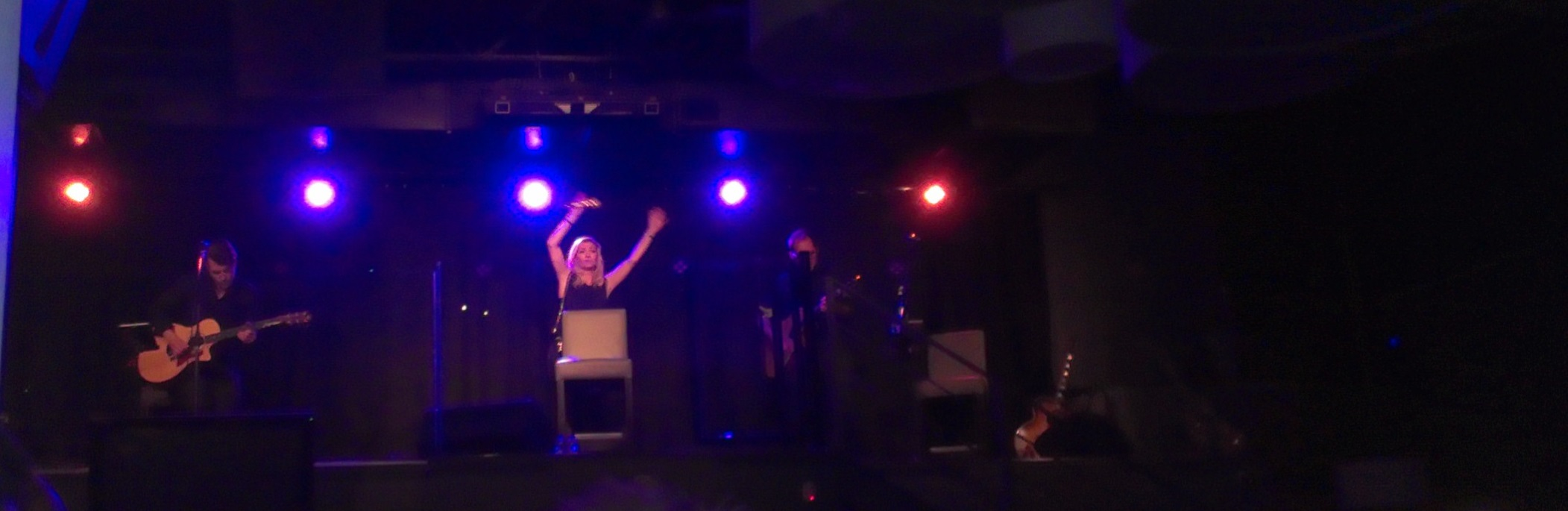

Background information
- Born: 14 July 1971 (age 54); Montreal, Quebec, Canada
- Genres: Pop
- Occupation: Singer
- Website: www.marie-chantaltoupin.com

Marie-Chantal Toupin (born July 14, 1971) is a Quebec singer. She has released a number of pop and soft rock music albums. Toupin has sold over 300,000 albums in Canada and has had two albums certified platinum.

== Early life ==
Toupin was born in Montreal, Quebec, growing up in the city's Rosemont neighbourhood.

== Career ==
Toupin released her first album, Apres Tout, in 1997, and followed this soon after with a self-titled album.

Toupin released Maudit bordel in 2003, and toured in Quebec to support the album, which was a 2004 Juno Award nominee for Francophone Album of the Year. In 2004, she sang at the Foire Brayonne music festival in Edmundston, New Brunswick.

Toupin's 2005 album Non-Negociable was certified platinum; a second edition was released in 2007.

Toupin left her manager Eduardo Da Costa, and after working independently and then with the Musicor label, returned to him in 2008; the result was an album of soft rock, À distance, in 2009. That same year she released an album of Christmas music, and in 2010 her sixth album, Premier baiser. Her album À ma manière : onze grands succès, released in 2012, was a collection of songs which had won Quebec's Félix Award.

In 2015, Toupin was criticized in the media for making racist comments on her Facebook page; this led the producers of the Pixcom home renovation television show "Flip de filles" to remove her as co-host.

In 2021 she was a competitor in the Quebec edition of Big Brother Célébrités, but voluntarily withdrew after getting drunk and making comments against other competitors which were widely perceived as racist and homophobic.

== Discography ==
- 1997 - Après tout
- 2000 - Marie-Chantal Toupin
- 2003 - Maudit Bordel (Platinum for sales of 100,000+ units)
- 2005 - Non-Négociable (Platinum for sales of 100,000+ units)
- 2008 - À Distance
- 2009 - Noël C'est L'amour
- 2010 - Premier Baiser
- 2012 - À ma manière Onze grands succès
- 2016 - Merci... Mes grands succès

Live album

- 2006 - Non négociable : La tournée
