= Galette =

French flat cake, pancake or pastry

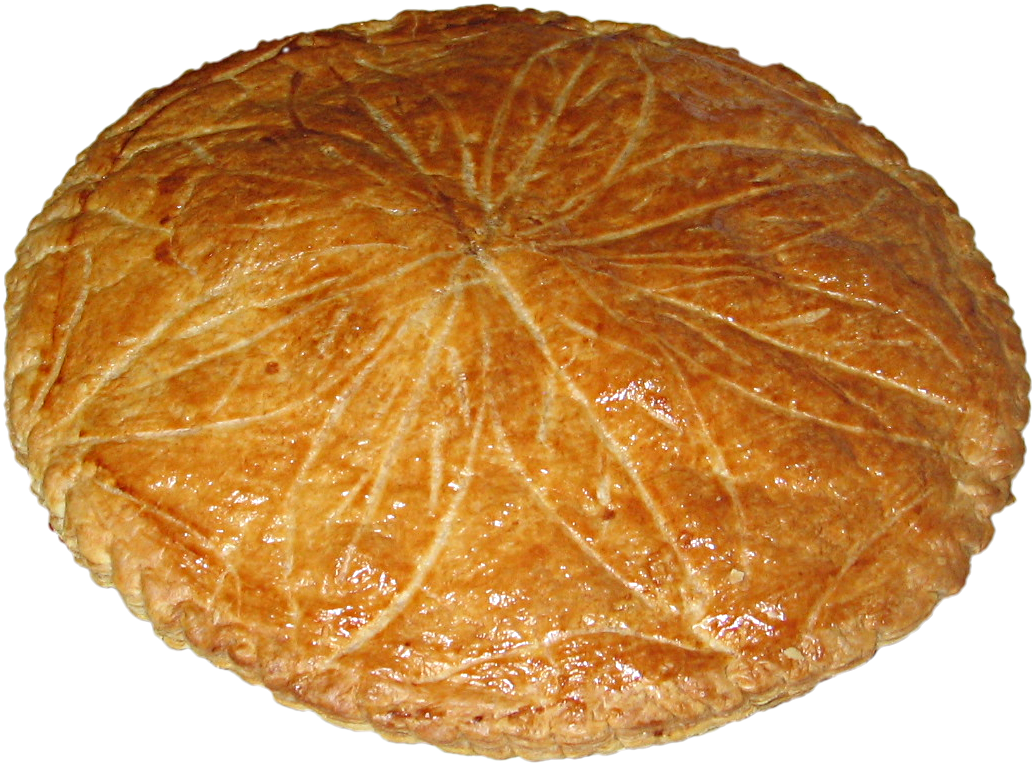
- A galette des Rois
- Type: Cake or waffle
- Place of origin: France
- Region or state: Normandy, Brittany, French Guiana
- Main ingredients: Flour
- Variations: Breton galette (galette bretonne), king cake, Creole galette

In French cuisine, a galette (from Norman: gale, 'flat cake') is one of various types of flat round or freeform crusty cakes or pies, or, in the case of a Breton galette (French: Galette bretonne [galɛt bʁətɔn]; Breton: Krampouezhenn gwinizh du), a pancake made with buckwheat flour, usually with a savoury filling.

One notable variety is the galette des rois (king cake) eaten on the day of Epiphany. In French Canada, a galette is a large cookie-like pastry.

== Fruit galette ==
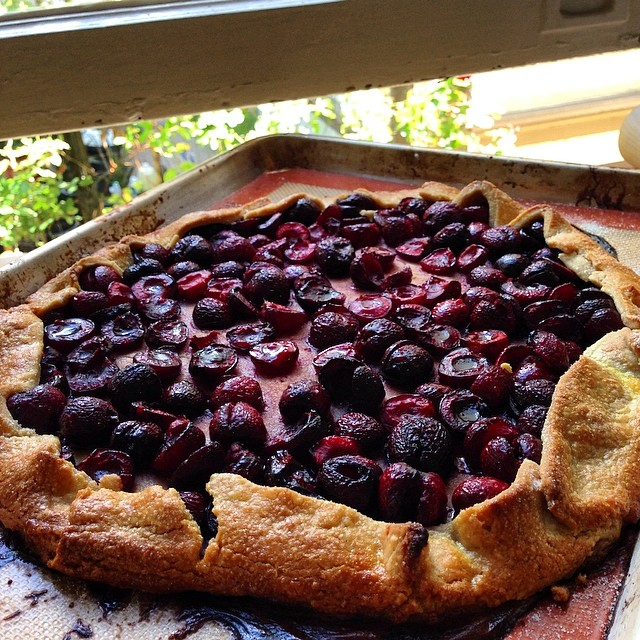
Cherry galette

A common form of galette resembles a type of single crust, free-form pie with a fruit filling and the crust folded partway over the top of the filling. The website joyofbaking.com defines the term galette as "a French term signifying a flat round cake that can be either sweet or savory and while [recipes can use] puff pastry as a base, they can also be made from risen doughs like brioche, or with a sweet pastry crust."

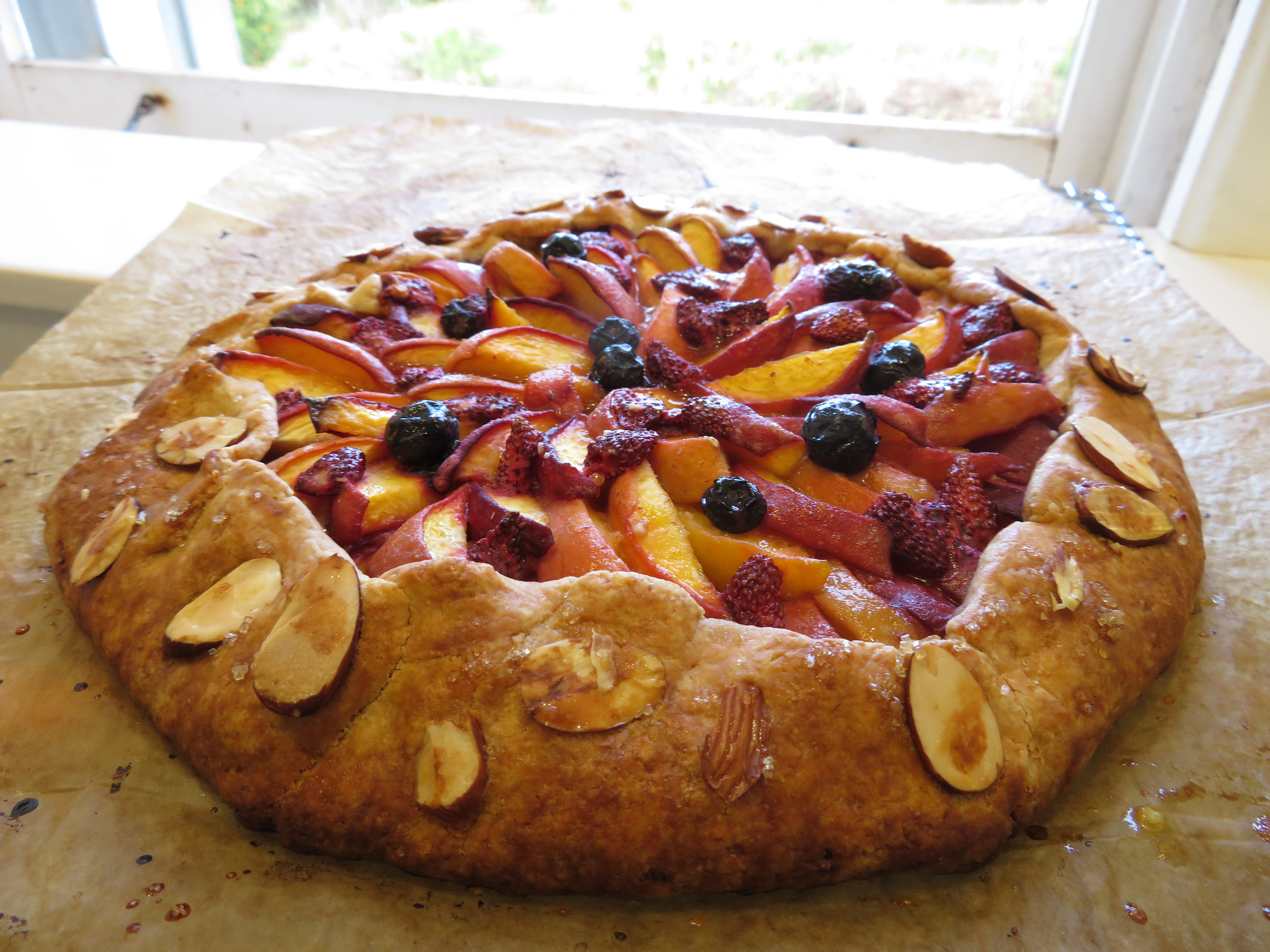
Peach, blueberry, and alpine strawberry galette

The fruits used in these types of galettes are typically seasonal and can include one or more of apples; berries such as strawberries or blueberries; or stone fruits such as peaches, plums, nectarines, or cherries. Various spices, zests, or peppers can be added in the preparation process if desired. The pastry base is often homemade but can also be commercially purchased; leftover supplies such as graham crackers can be employed as well. Fruit galettes can be served warm and/or with ice cream.

Bon Appétit magazine has written of such galettes, "They're casually impressive and photogenic, but in that 'Oh, I just threw this together' way. They're rustic and inviting; come as you are. ... Their imperfections are what set them apart—in fact, the less you do, the better they look."

== Breton galette ==
Galette, which is more properly called Breton galette, is also the name given in most French crêperies to savoury buckwheat flour pancakes, while those made from wheat flour, much smaller in size and mostly served with a sweet filling, are branded crêpes. This type of galette is a large, thin pancake mostly associated with the region of Brittany, where it replaced at times bread as basic food, but it is eaten countrywide. Buckwheat was introduced as a crop suitable to impoverished soils and buckwheat pancakes were known in other regions where this crop was cultivated, such as Limousin or Auvergne.

It is frequently garnished with egg, meat, fish, cheese, cut vegetables, apple slices, berries, or similar ingredients. One of the most popular varieties is a galette covered with grated Emmental cheese, a slice of ham, and an egg cooked on the galette. In France this is known as a galette complète (a complete galette). Another variety is a hot sausage wrapped in a galette (called galette saucisse, a tradition of Rennes, Brittany) and eaten like a hot dog.

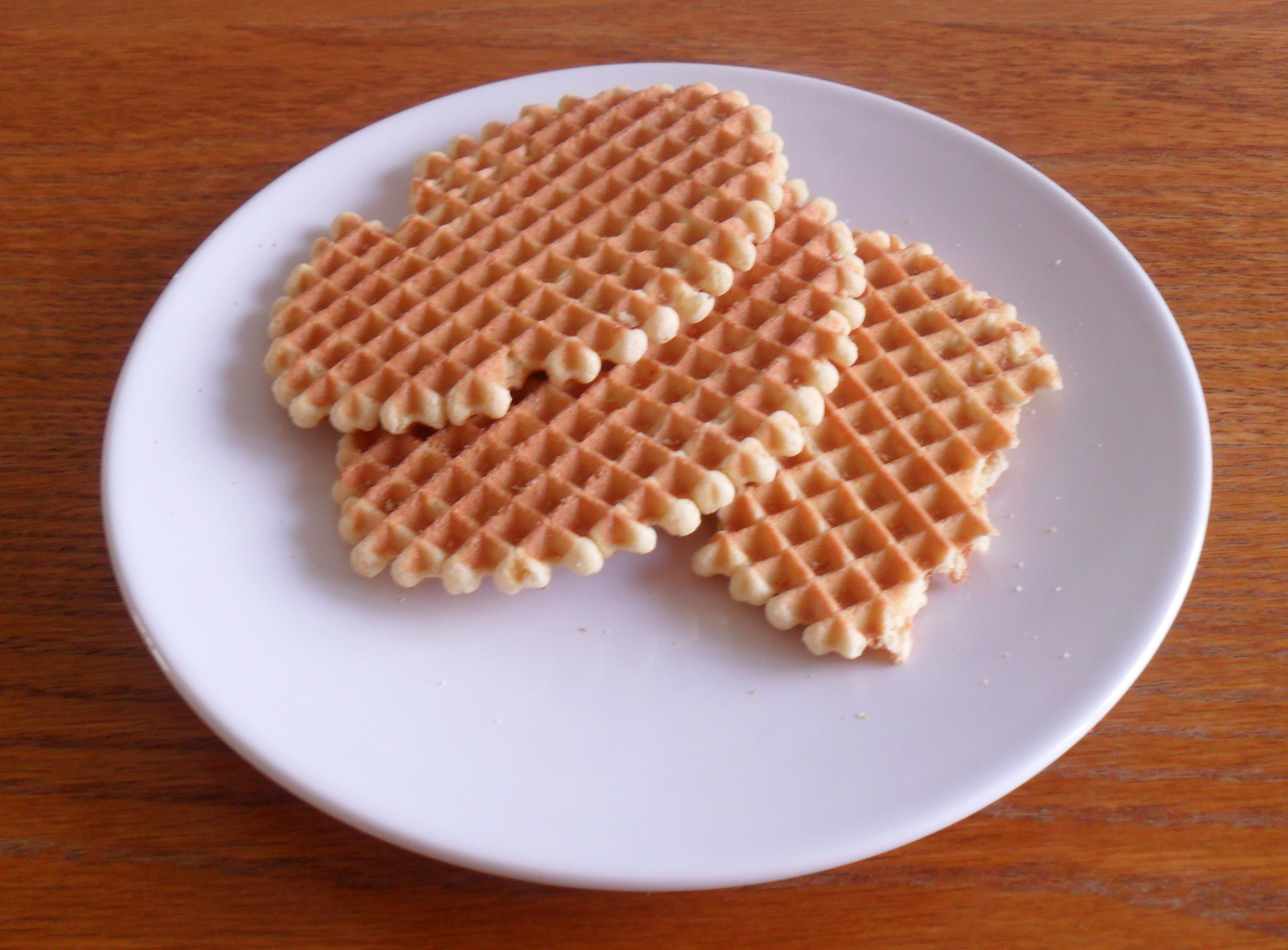
Galettes campinoises are a type of galette or waffle popular in Belgium.

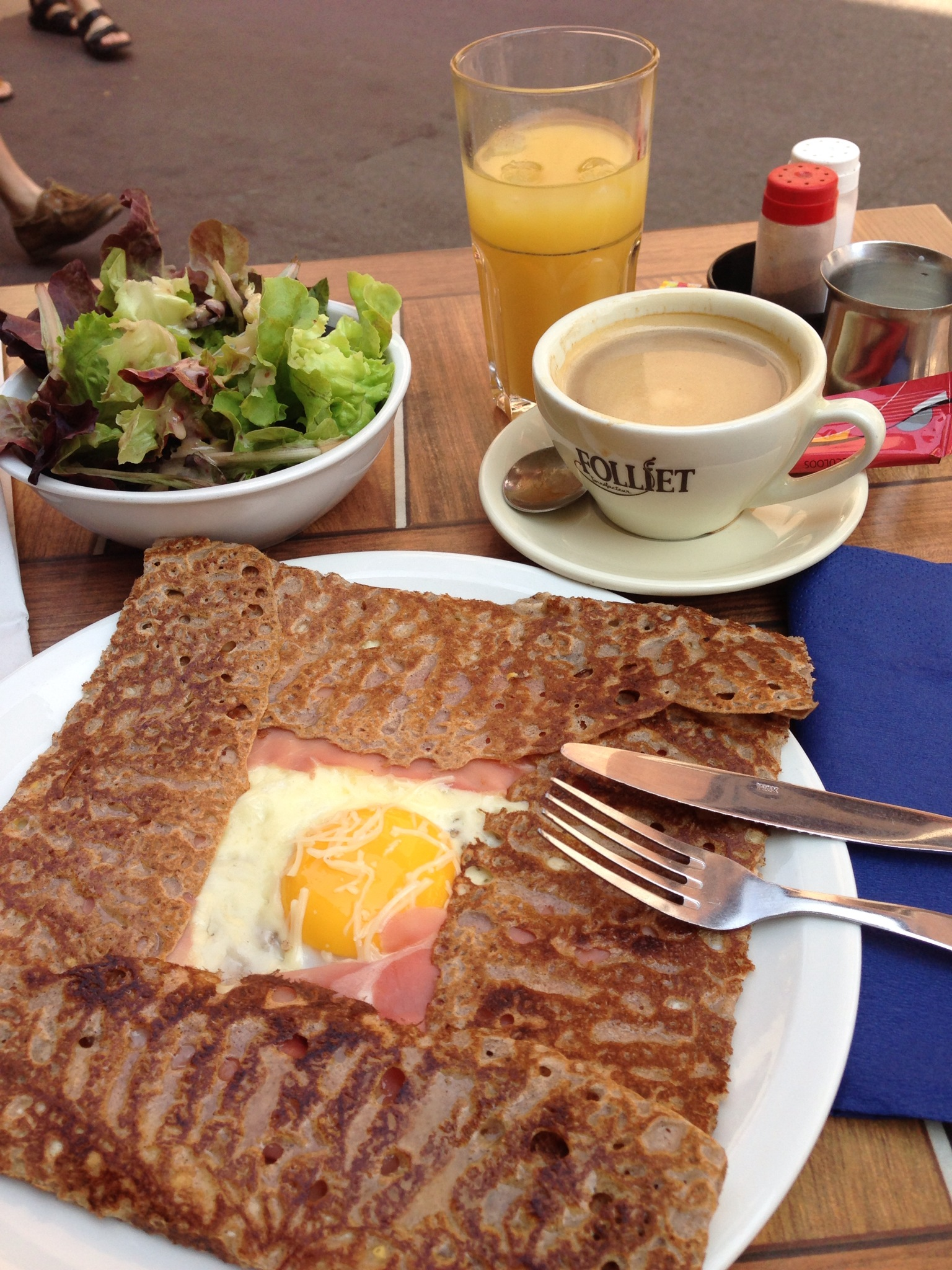
A galette complète served in Annecy, France

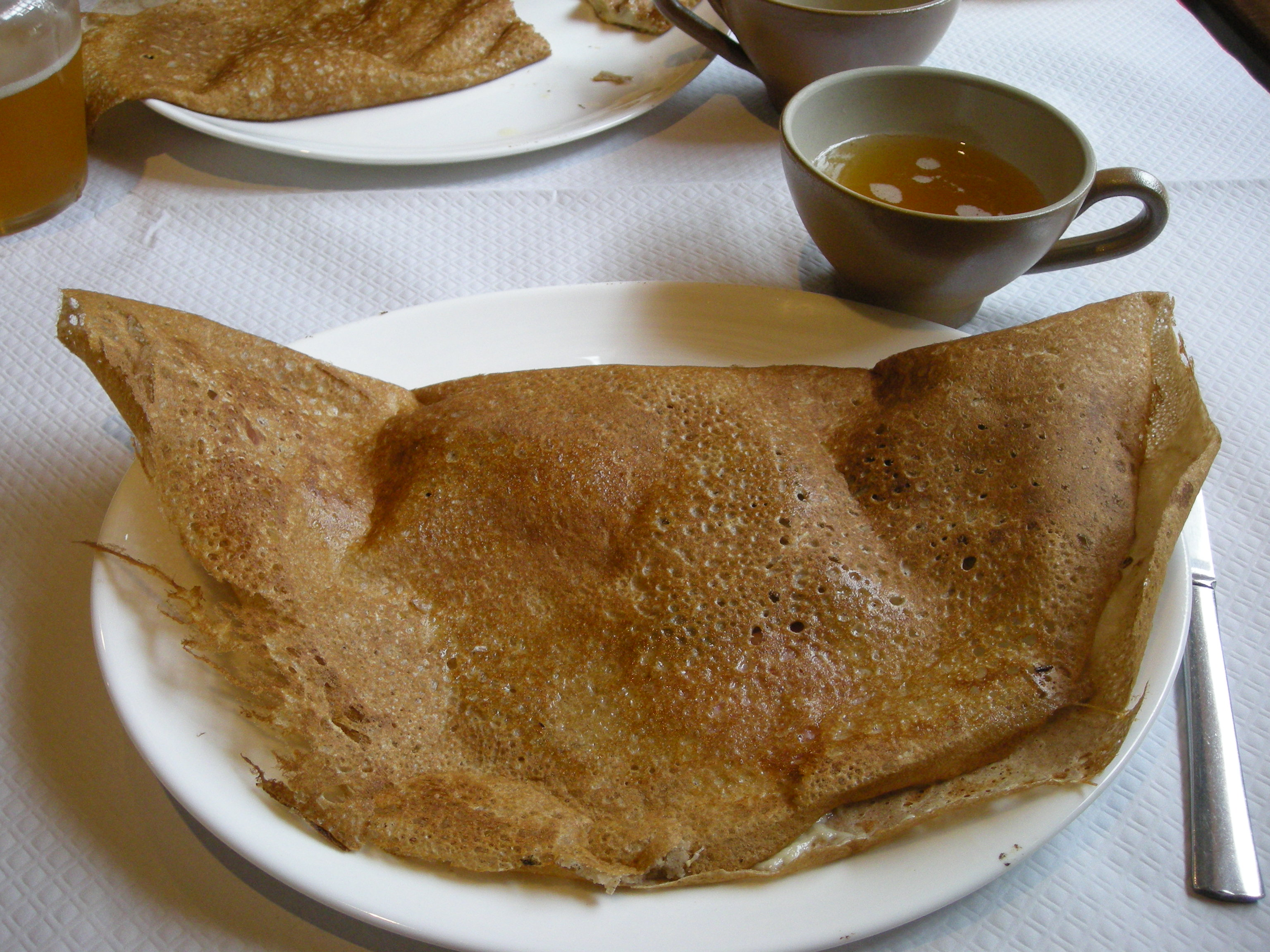
A galette and cider in Villedieu-les-Poêles, Normandy, France

== Creole galette ==
The Guianan galette (more commonly known as the Creole galette) is a traditional pastry of French Guianan cuisine. This is a Creole variant of the galette des rois which is eaten as a dessert during Epiphany.

It can be garnished with cream, coconut, guava, etc. It is consumed throughout the Carnival period (from the Epiphany until Lent, beginning Ash Wednesday) and preferably accompanied by champagne.

== See also ==
- Bing (Chinese flatbread) – Chinese flatbread
- Crepe maker – Cooking device
- Kouign amann – Breton baked sweet goods
- List of pancakes
