= Stip (dish) =

Dutch buckwheat porridge

- Type: Porridge
- Place of origin: Netherlands
- Main ingredients: Buckwheat, bacon, syrup

Stip is a regional dish in the Dutch provinces of Groningen, Drenthe, and Overijssel. It is served as buckwheat porridge with a hole containing fried bacon and a big spoonful of syrup.

The traditional way to eat this dish follows two steps. First, a bite from the outside of the dish is dipped into the central hole with syrup. This is continued until the edge of the hole is breached. After the breach, the dish is mixed and continued until finished. Because of this playful eating style, the dish is popular among children.

== Name ==
The name stip is derived of the regional word Stippen which means to dip into something.

Stip is also referred to as; stip-in-t-gat, potstroop and luie wievenkost. This last name translates into lazy wife's food. It refers to the ease with which this dish is made. The dish is prepared by boiling the milk, adding the wheat, and letting it sit.

== See also ==
- List of buckwheat dishes
- List of porridges
