= Cretons =

French-Canadian pork-based spread

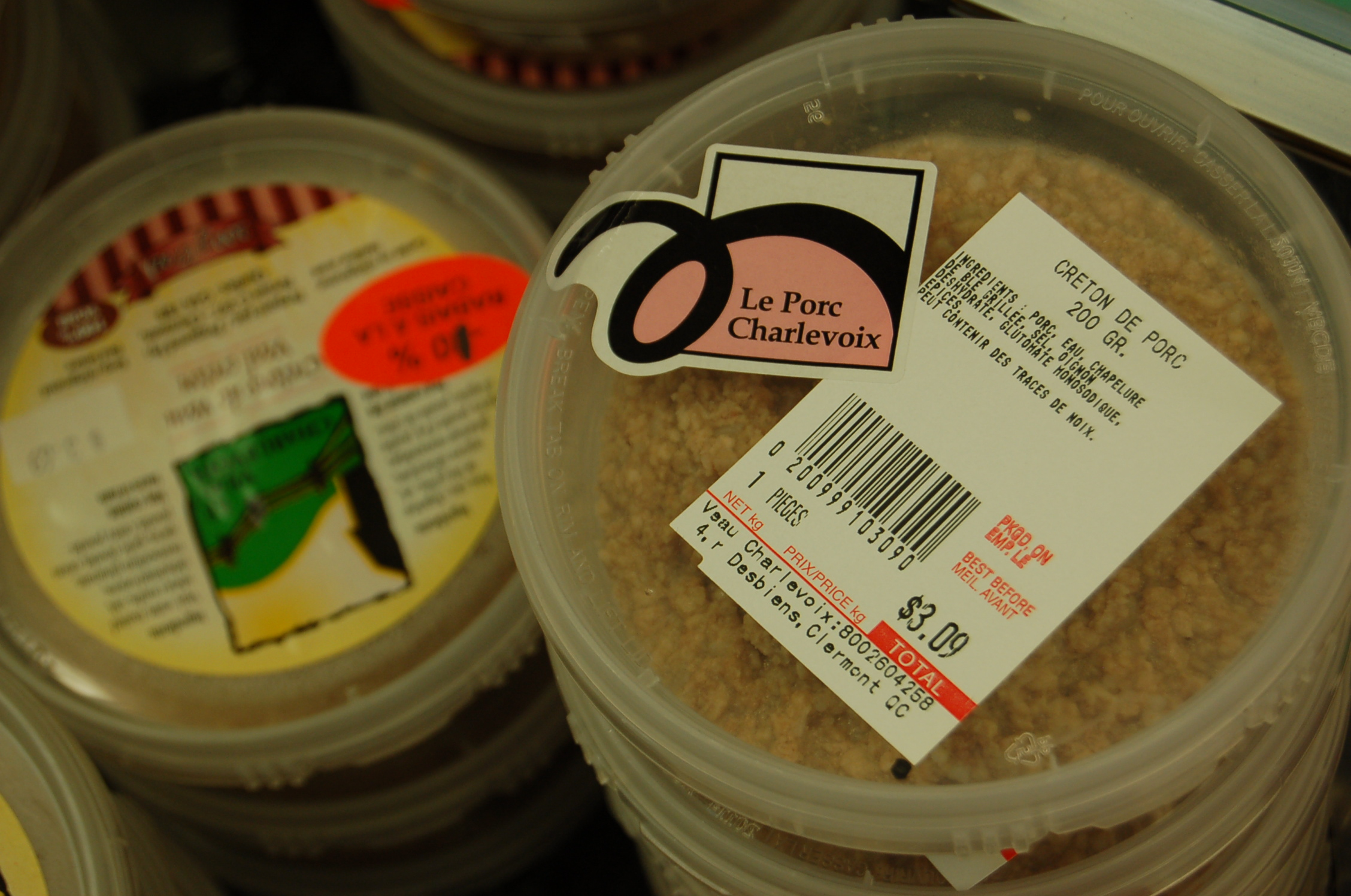
- Alternative names: Gorton, corton, cretonnade
- Type: Spread
- Place of origin: Canada
- Region or state: Quebec
- Main ingredients: Pork, onions, spices

In Quebec cuisine, cretons (sometimes gorton or corton, especially among New Englanders of French-Canadian origin) is a forcemeat-style pork spread containing onions and spices. Its fatty texture and taste make it resemble French rillettes. Cretons are usually served on toast as part of a traditional Quebec breakfast. It is not to be confused with "fromage de tête" (tête fromagée in Quebec), known in English as head cheese.

== Recipes ==
Recipes vary, but traditional preparation involves covering 1–3 lbs of ground pork shoulder in milk or water in a large pot, then seasoning with onions and a mixture of spices. The blend of spices varies from recipe to recipe, but nearly all include ground cloves. Other spices often used include cinnamon, allspice, ginger, nutmeg, and bay leaf. Some recipes include minced garlic.

The mixture is simmered gently over low heat, and stirred often to prevent scorching until all the liquid is cooked off and the mixture is thick. It is then allowed to cool, then stirred again to incorporate all the rendered fat, and transferred to a large, clean container or individual containers, covered tightly, and refrigerated for several hours or overnight until firm. Pig marrow is also often added to form a gelatin that allows it to congeal.

== Cretonnade ==
Technically, cretons is pork-based; otherwise, it is a cretonnade, especially if it is veal- or poultry-based. However, the distinction is often not made, even in French, with either type being called cretons.

== See also ==
- List of spreads
