= Memil-buchimgae =

Korean buckwheat pancake

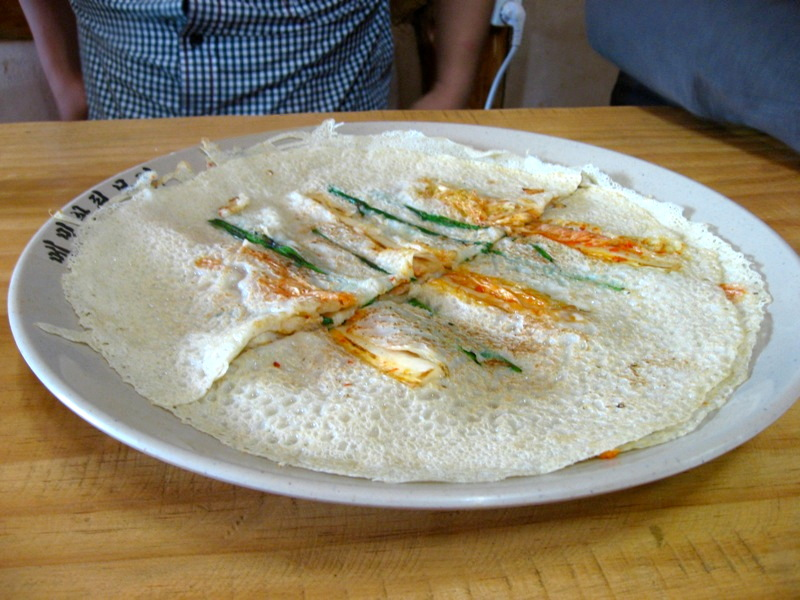
- Type: Buchimgae
- Place of origin: Korea
- Region or state: Gangwon
- Main ingredients: Buckwheat, vegetables or kimchi
- Similar dishes: Blini, Kaletez

Korean name
- Hangul: 메밀부침개
- RR: memilbuchimgae
- MR: memilbuch'imgae
- IPA: [me.mil.bu.tɕʰim.ɡɛ]

Memil-buchimgae (Korean: 메밀부침개) or buckwheat pancake is a variety of buchimgae, or Korean pancake. It is a crepe-like dish made of thin buckwheat batter and napa cabbage.

Along with other buckwheat dishes, it is a traditional local speciality of Gangwon Province, where buckwheat is extensively cultivated due to its cooler mountainous climate. Pyeongchang and Jeongseon counties are famous for buckwheat dishes such as memilmuk (buckwheat jelly) and memilguksu (buckwheat noodles). Pyeongchang's biggest local festival was called Memilbuchigi festival before it was renamed Pyeongchang Festival in 2015. (Memilbuchigi means memilbuchimgae in Gangwon dialect.) Numerous memilbuchimgae can be seen in Pyeongchang Market, a farmers' market held in Pyeongchang every five days.

== Preparation ==
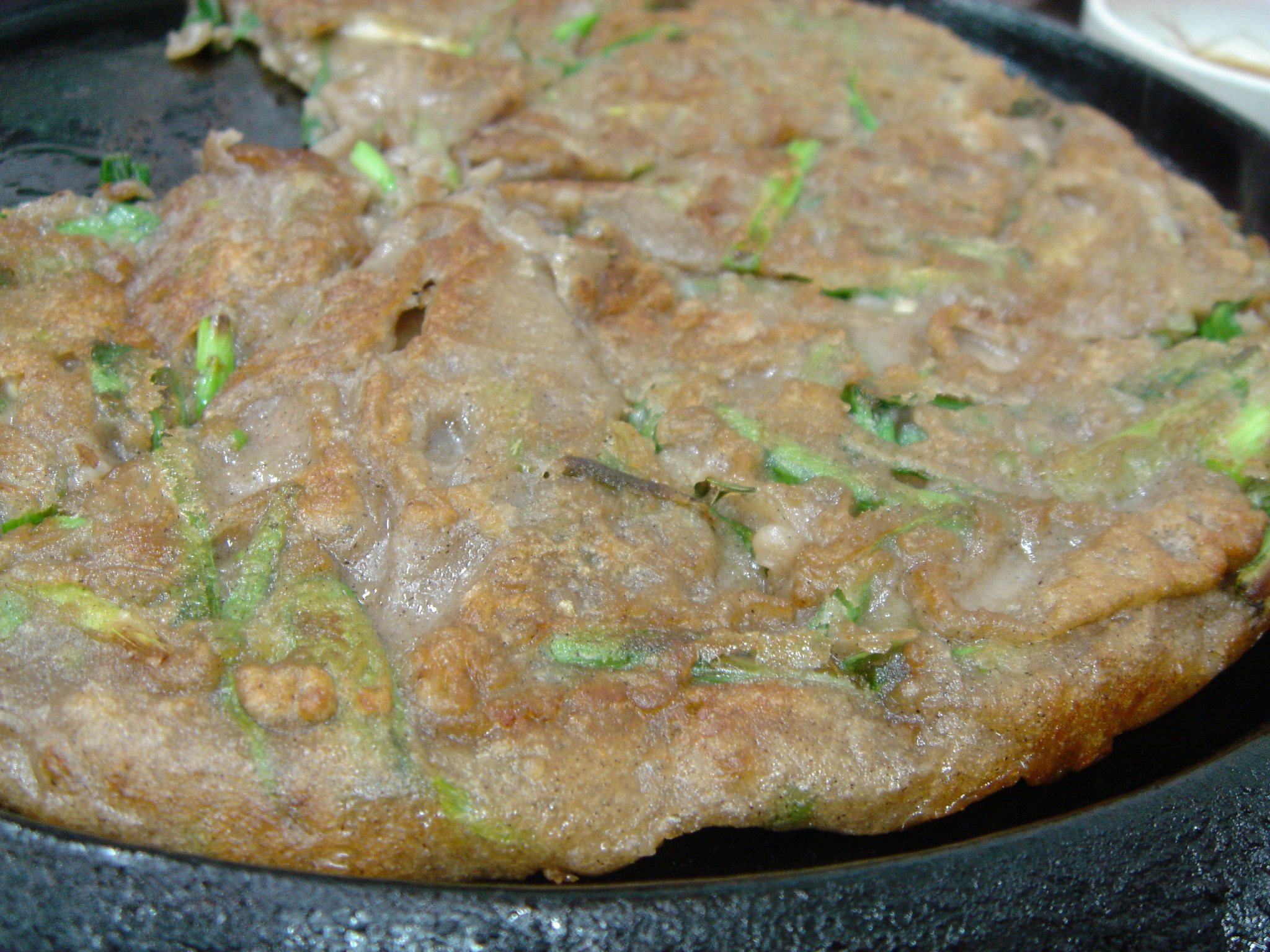
Memilbuchimgae

The batter is prepared by mixing buckwheat flour and water to a thin consistency. Sometimes a small amount of wheat flour or starch can be added to it because buckwheat has less glutinous elements. In a traditional way, buckwheat mixed with water is ground by millstone and the batter is strained through a sieve. The filtered batter is cooked on a sodang (소당) which is the lid of a sot (솥, a traditional big pot) and used for pan-frying. Several pieces of vertically ripped salted napa cabbage and scallions are put on the heated sodang, and the batter is poured over them from their margin. Sour kimchi can be replaced with the cabbage. When making the memilbuchimgae, the batter should be poured thinly because thick memilbuchimgae is considered less delicious. Perilla oil is used to cook the dish.

== Foods made with memilbuchimgae ==
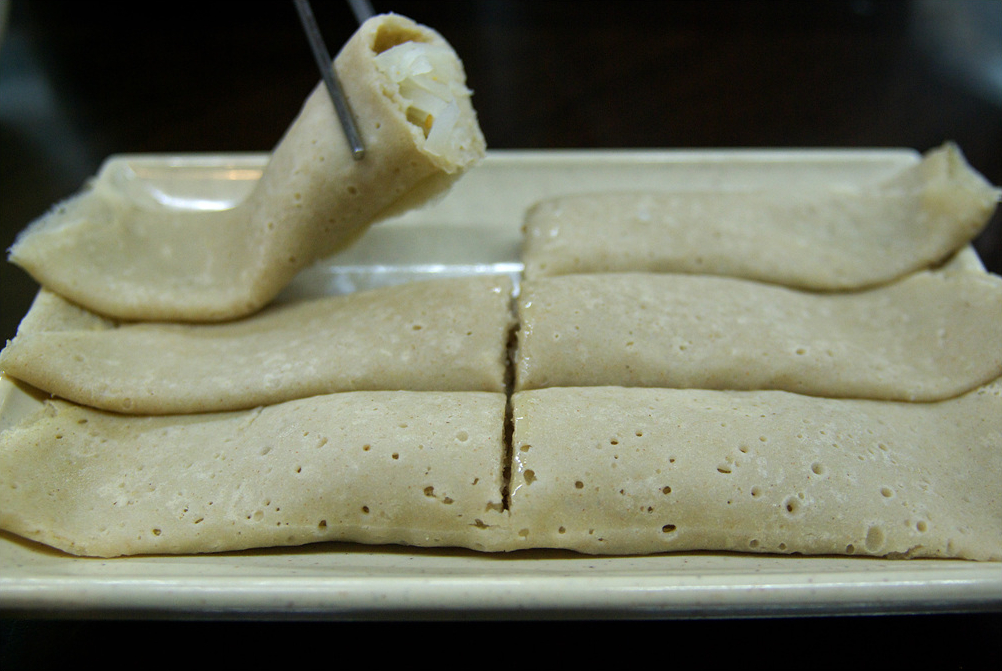
Bingtteok, Jeju specialty

Memilbuchimgae can be used as an ingredient in other dishes such as memil chongtteok (메밀총떡), also called memil jeonbyeong (메밀전병). The dish is formed like a dumpling or wrap stuffed with any available ingredient according to recipe, taste, or region. In the Jeju region, the dish is called bingtteok (빙떡) or Jejudo bindaetteok and stuffed with boiled shredded radish. The fillings commonly used in Gangwon Province are japchae (noodle salad), shredded sour kimchi, radish, scallions, garlic, and pork or squid which are seasoned and stir-fried together. In the Pyeongchang region, half transparent noodles called cheonsachae (천사채), which are made from kelp, are especially used.

The dish is considered a good anju because the combination of the savoury and somewhat bland taste of memilbuchimgae combined with the pungent flavour of the filling makes a good companion for drinking alcoholic beverages.

== See also ==
- Kaletez
- Buchimgae
- Crêpe
- Blini
- List of buckwheat dishes
