= Flattop grill =

Cooking appliance

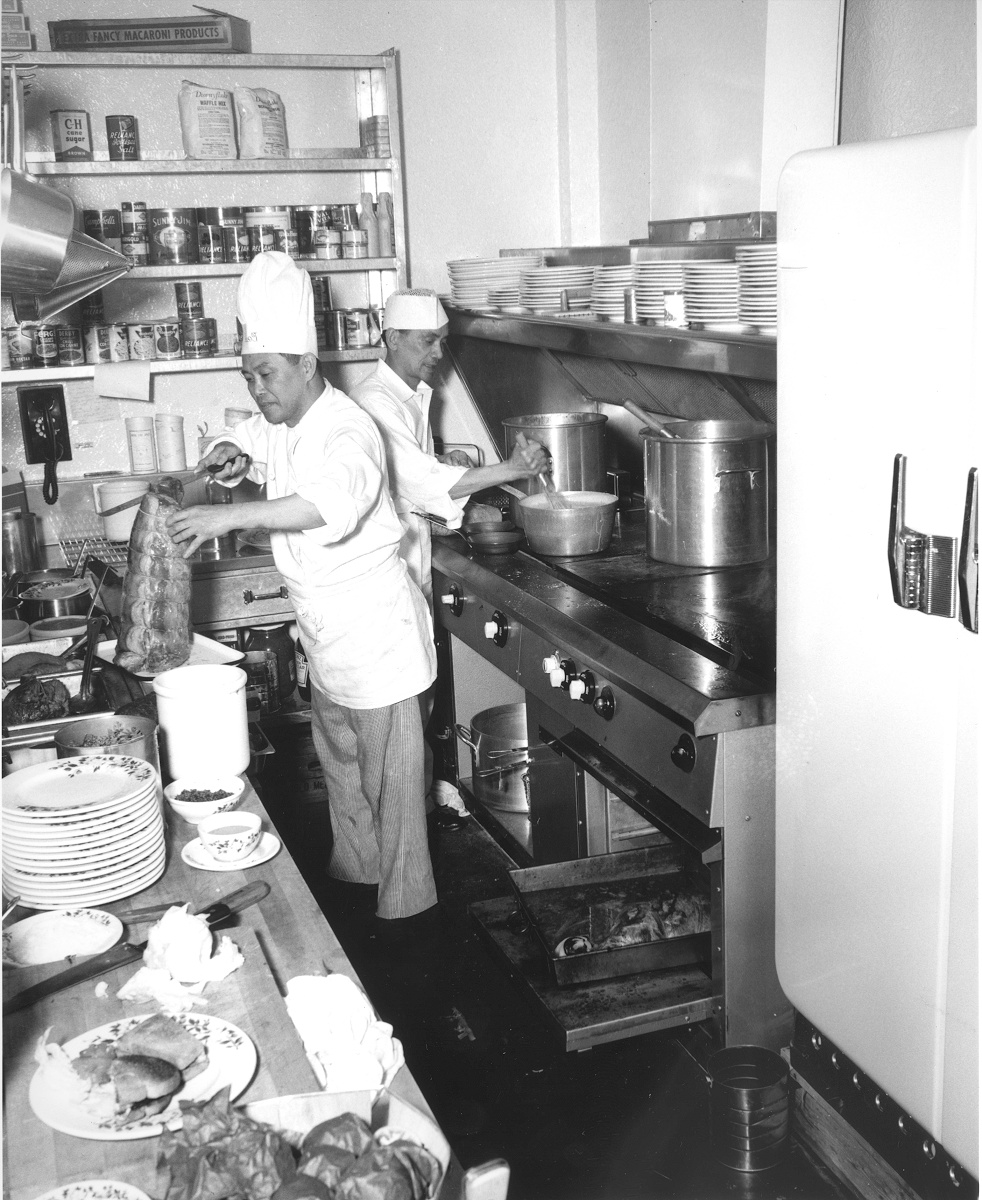
Cooks at the Northern Lights Dining Room, Seattle, Washington, 1952. A flattop grill being used is located on the right.

A flattop grill is a cooking appliance that resembles a griddle but performs differently because the heating element is circular rather than straight (side to side). This heating technology creates an extremely hot and even cooking surface, as heat spreads in a radial fashion over the surface. Flattop grills have been around for hundreds of years in various forms and evolved in a number of cultures.

== History ==
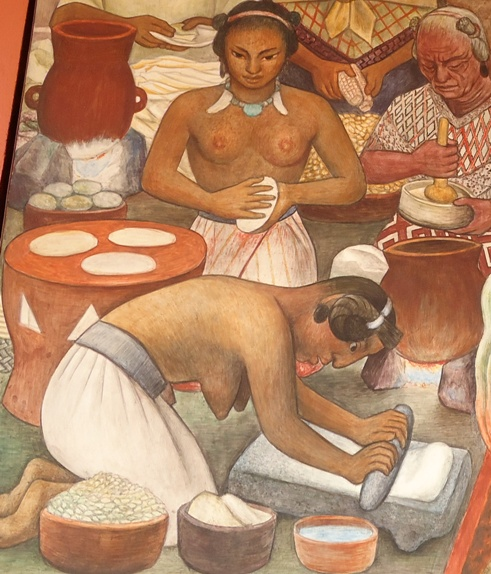
Aztec women using a flattop grill

The first flattop grills originated in the 19th century in Mexico and Central America for cooking corn dough. These flattop grills were made of clay. With the arrival of Spaniards, the griddles were manufactured of metal materials. Spaniards adopted these grills with the name plancha, which means "metal plate". Food that is cooked a la plancha means "grilled on a metal plate". For example, filetes a la plancha translates as "grilled beef fillets".

== Description ==
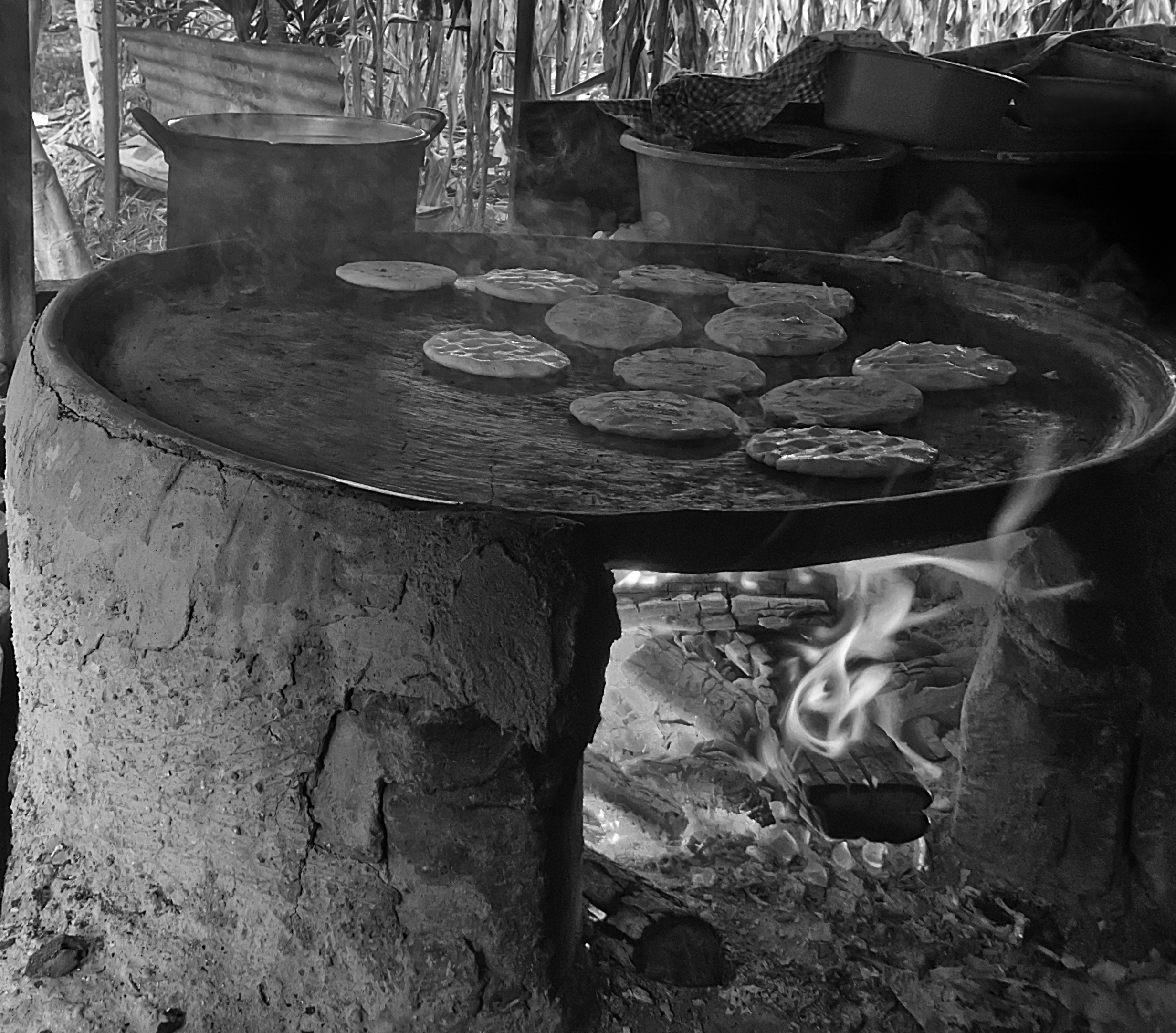
Traditional Pupusas on comal

The flattop grill is a versatile platform for many cooking techniques such as sautéing, toasting, simmering, shallow frying, stir frying, pan frying, browning, blackening, grilling, baking, braising, and roasting, and can also be used for flambéing. In addition, pots and pans can be placed directly on the cook surface, giving more cooking flexibility. In most cases, the steel cooking surface seasons like cast iron cookware, providing a natural non-stick surface. Almost any type of food can be cooked on this type of appliance. In addition to standard barbecue fare like hamburgers, hot dogs and sausages, more delicate items can be cooked on a flattop grill. Omelettes, pancakes, crepes, paninis, yakisoba noodles, fried rice, tacos, quesadillas, grilled steak, bacon, flatbread, pizza, jerk chicken, crab cakes and sautéed vegetables are just a few examples of the wide range of foods that can be prepared on a flattop grill.

Flattop grills, as the name implies, is typically a flat piece of steel but some are slightly convex or crowned in the center which allows excess juices or grease to flow to the outside to be captured and disposed of. Many are powered by natural gas or propane, but there are electric models as well. In addition, there are models made for indoor or outdoor cooking that can be fixed (built-in) or portable (wheeled or free-standing).

Flattop grills can be contrasted with open-flame grills, which cook food over a grate with direct or indirect flame. Flattop grills avoid the problem of smaller or delicate food falling through the grate like open-flame grills. In addition, closed-flame flattop grills are more energy efficient because they capture the heat under the steel cook surface rather than letting it escape through the grates into the atmosphere. This design also requires less time to heat up and uses less fuel to cook a meal. Also, flattop grills release less smoke and particulates into the atmosphere because food and juices are prevented from dropping directly onto burner elements, eliminating flare-ups and reducing smoke.

== Use ==
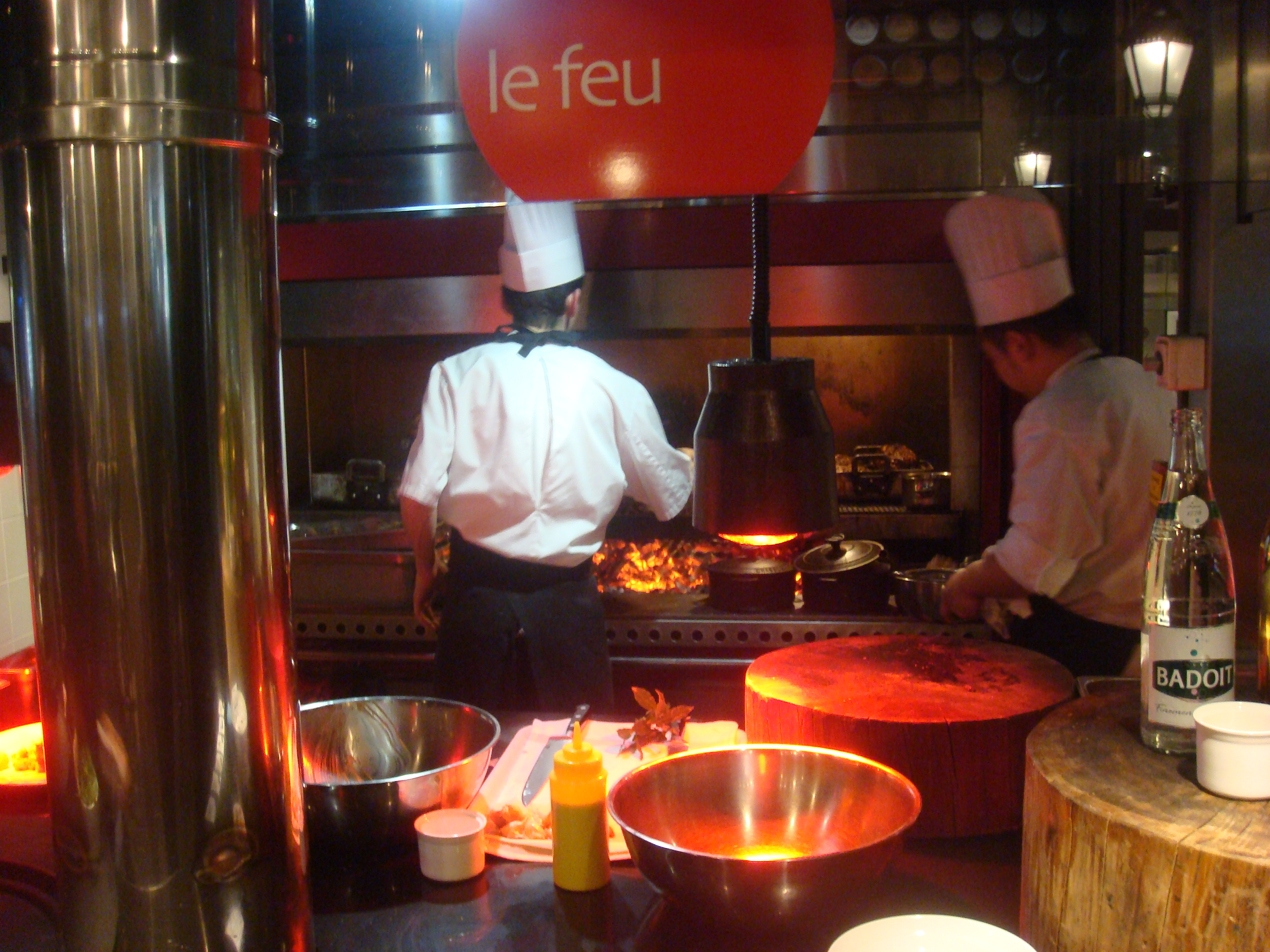
A flattop grill and fireplace area atop the grill used to heat an above cooking area, at Le Feu restaurant in Lyon, France

Flattop grills are an equipment of choice for seafood restaurants because of temperature consistency, flexibility and capacity.

In Cuban cuisine, the Cuban sandwich (ham, roasted pork, Swiss cheese and pickles) is traditionally grilled à la plancha. In Chilean cuisine, restaurants grill beef à la plancha and have a long history of cooking seafood on flattop grills. Flattop grills also share some characteristics with Asian cooking, including teppanyaki and Mongolian barbecue. Flatbreads from India (dosa, paratha, roti and chapati), the Middle East (pita), Africa (injera) and Jamaica (bammy) are traditionally cooked on flattop grills.

=== Front-of-house cooking ===
In restaurants, flattop grills are sometimes used for display, or "front-of-house" cooking, where diners can see, hear and smell the food being cooked in front of them. Unlike butane burners or induction hobs which require additional equipment, the flattop grill can be used as a standalone cooking platform. Display cooking is a notable trend in commercial foodservice, where open kitchens are becoming part of the dining experience, and watching a meal being prepared live-action has become entertainment.

== French tops ==
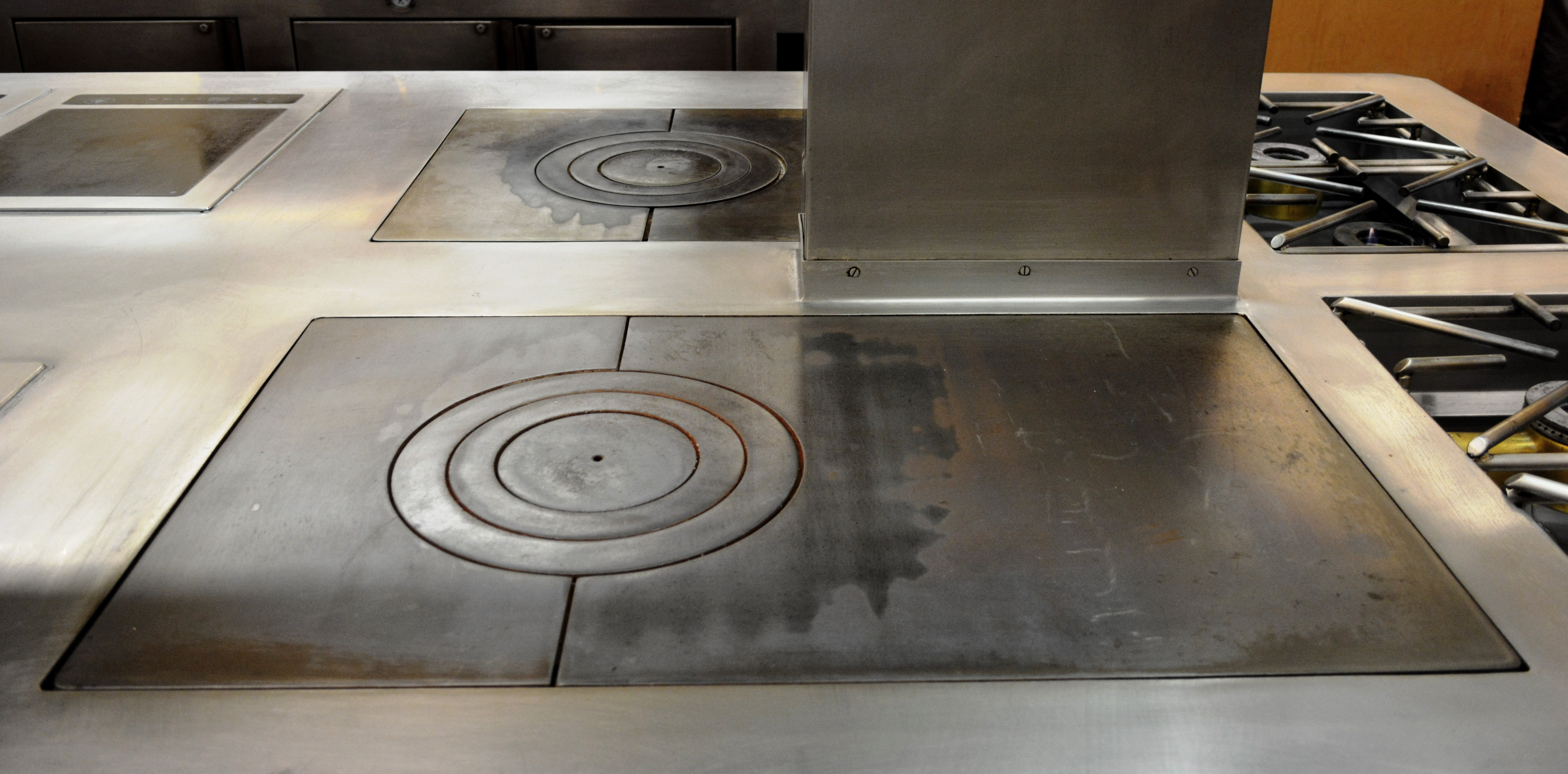
Two French tops built into a cooking suite

A French top stove is similar to a flattop grill, except that it is only used with pots and pans. A large flame underneath the metal plate serves as its heat source, and is directly covered by concentric metal rings. The French top's temperature is usually not changed by its user, instead the user moves the pot or pan to a side or edge of the hot plate for slower cooking.

== See also ==
- List of stoves
- Comal
- Griddle
- Hot plate
- Teppan
- Tava
- Sheet pan
