= Comal (cookware) =

Latin American griddle

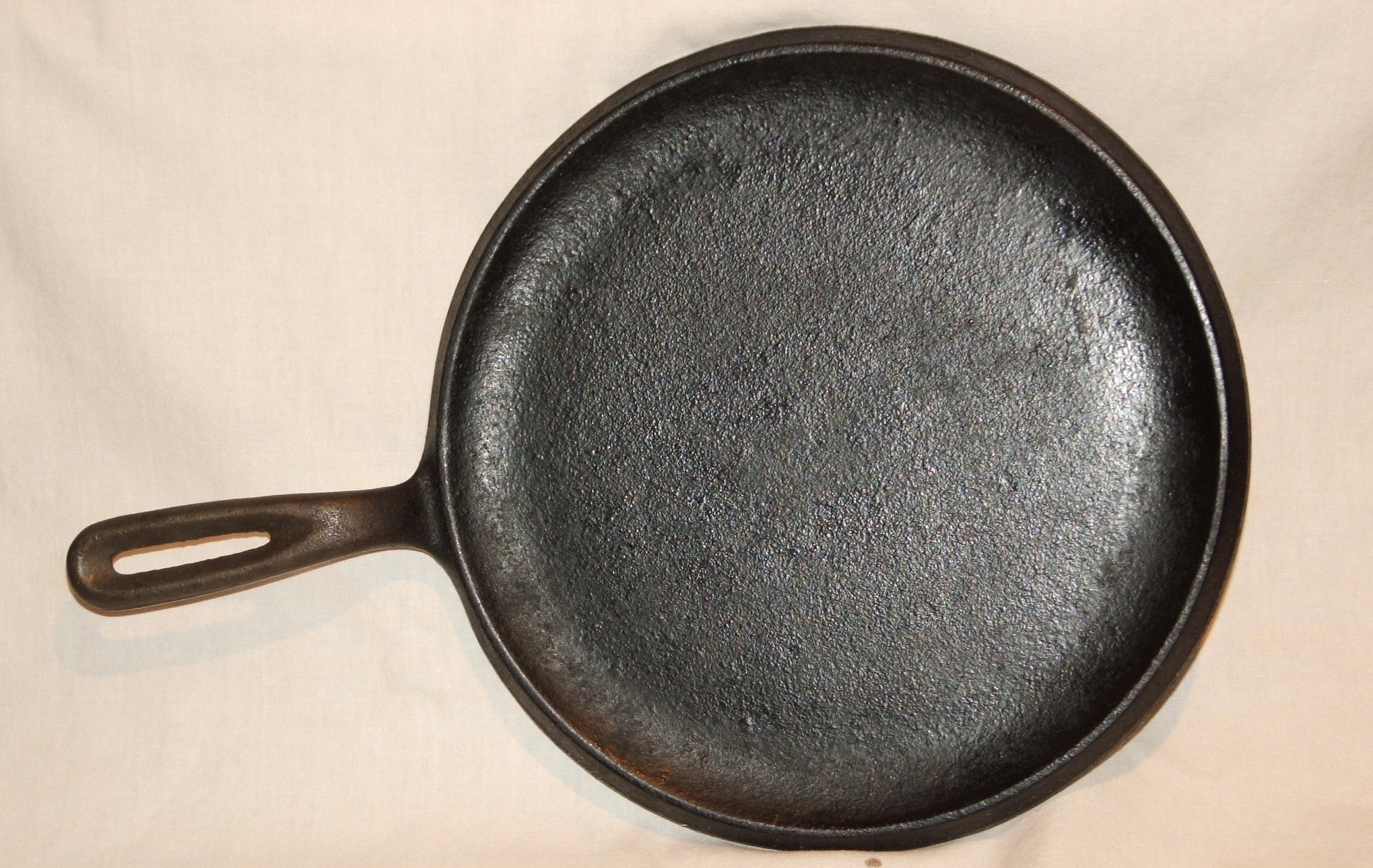
A cast-iron comal

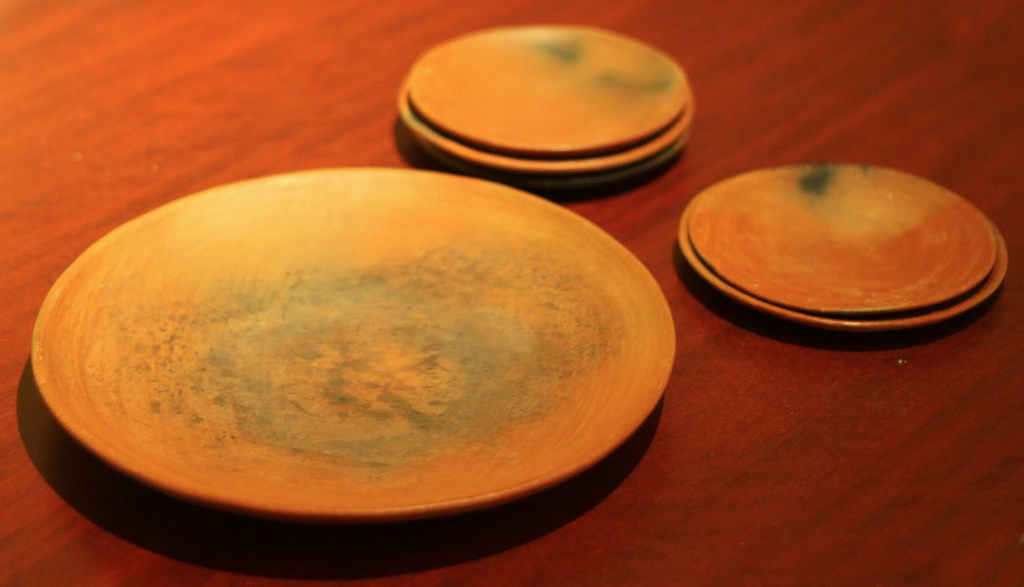
Earthenware comals of various sizes

A comal is a smooth, flat griddle typically used in Mexico, Central America, and parts of South America, to cook tortillas and arepas, toast spices and nuts, sear meat, and generally prepare food. Similar cookware is called a budare in Venezuela. Some comals are concave and made of barro (clay). These are still made and used by the indigenous peoples of Mexico and Central America. Comals are similar to the American griddle or the Indian tawa, and are often used and named interchangeably with these.

Comals for home use are generally made from heavy cast iron, and sized to fit over either one burner on the stovetop (round) or two burners front to back (elongated oval). In many indigenous and pre-Hispanic cultures, the comal is handed down from grandmother to mother to daughter, the idea being that a comal tempered over many years of use will heat faster and cook cleaner.

== History ==
The history of such cooking methods dates back to the pre-Columbian era, when powdered-hominy tortillas were cooked on an earthenware comal over an open fire. Comales were also used to toast cacao beans. The word "comal" comes from the Aztec Nahuatl word comalli.

Originally they were thin ceramic pieces, with slightly raised edges. They are found at archaeological sites throughout Central America, with the earliest examples dating to 700 BCE.

== Gallery ==
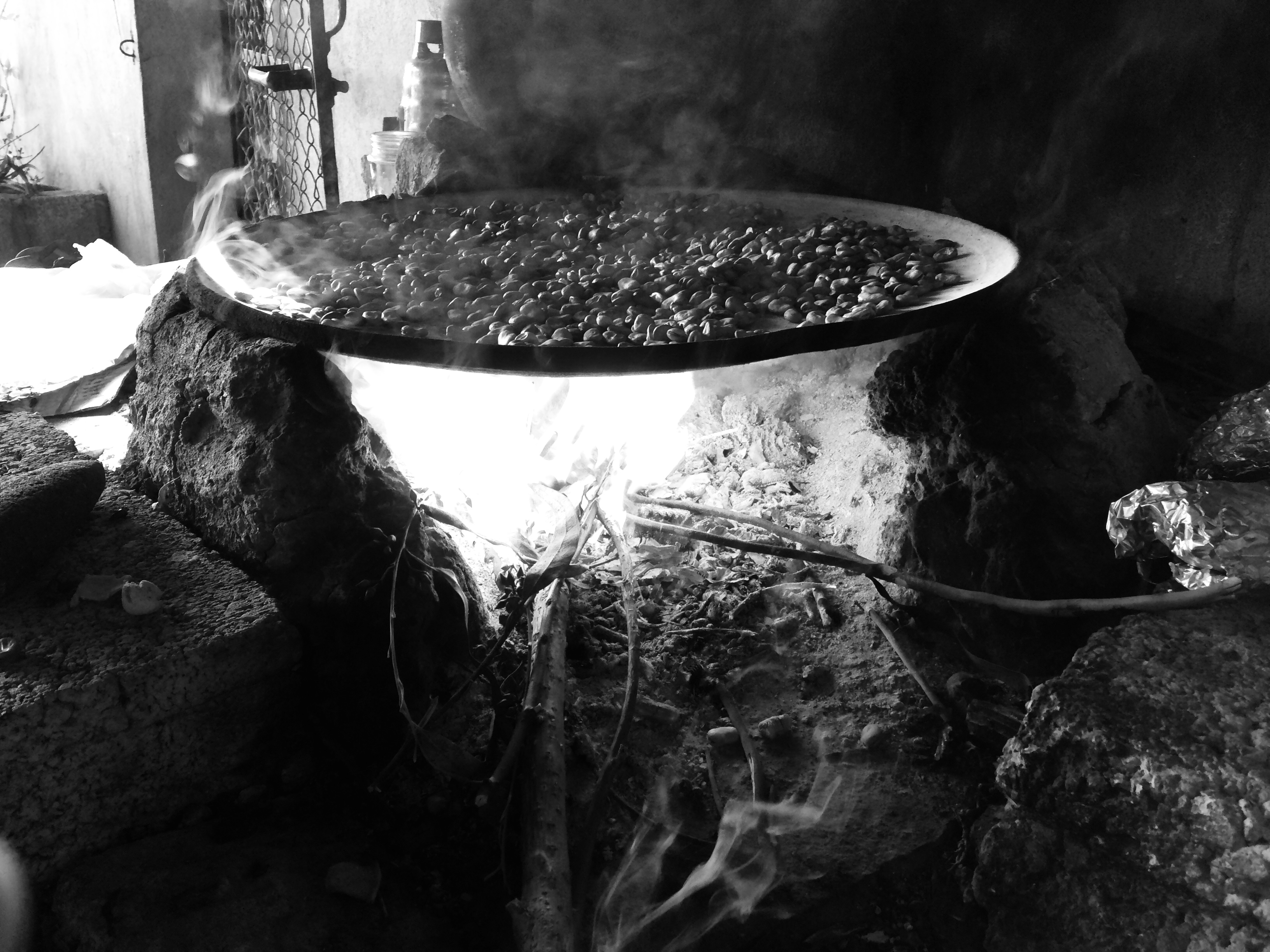

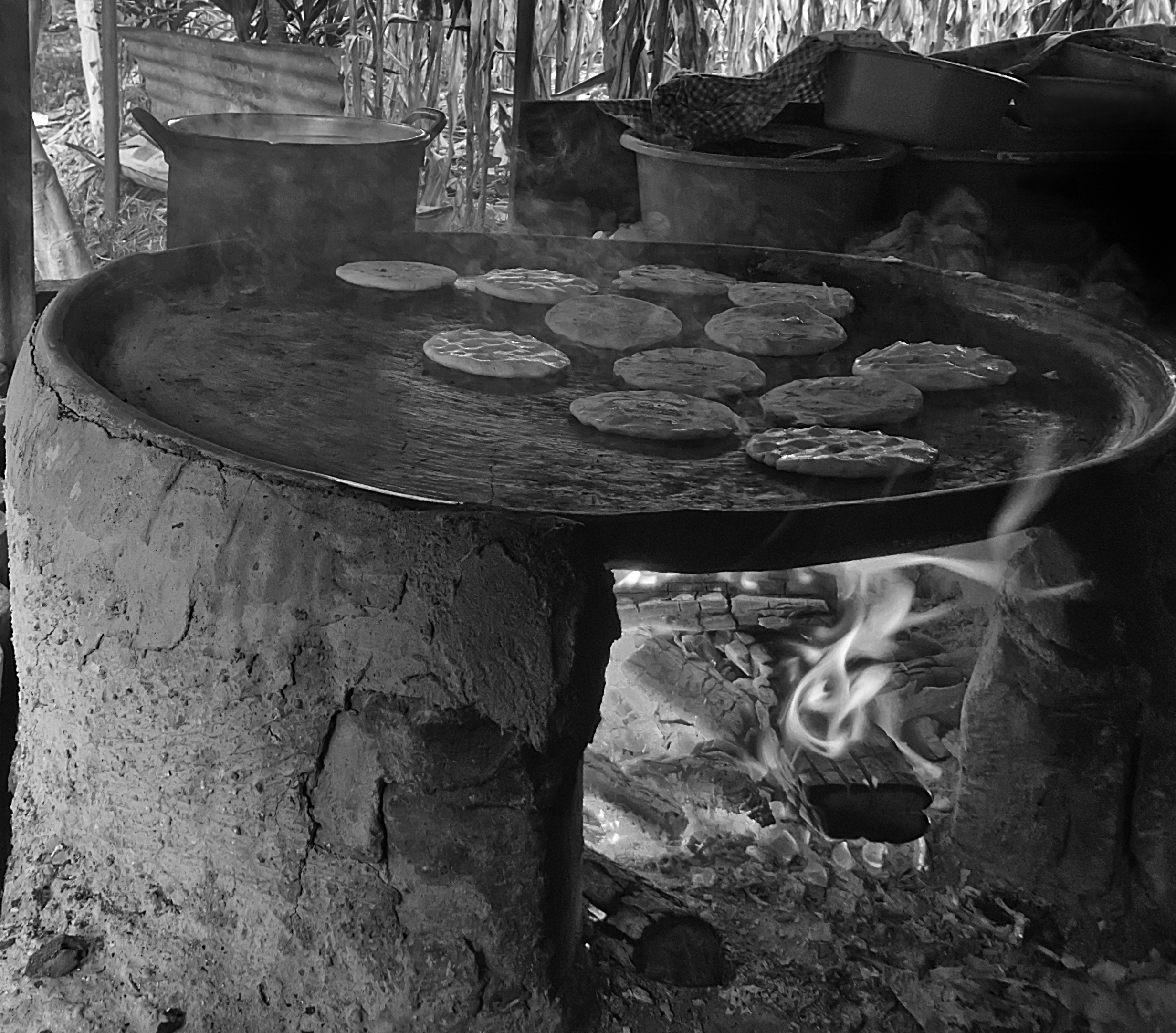

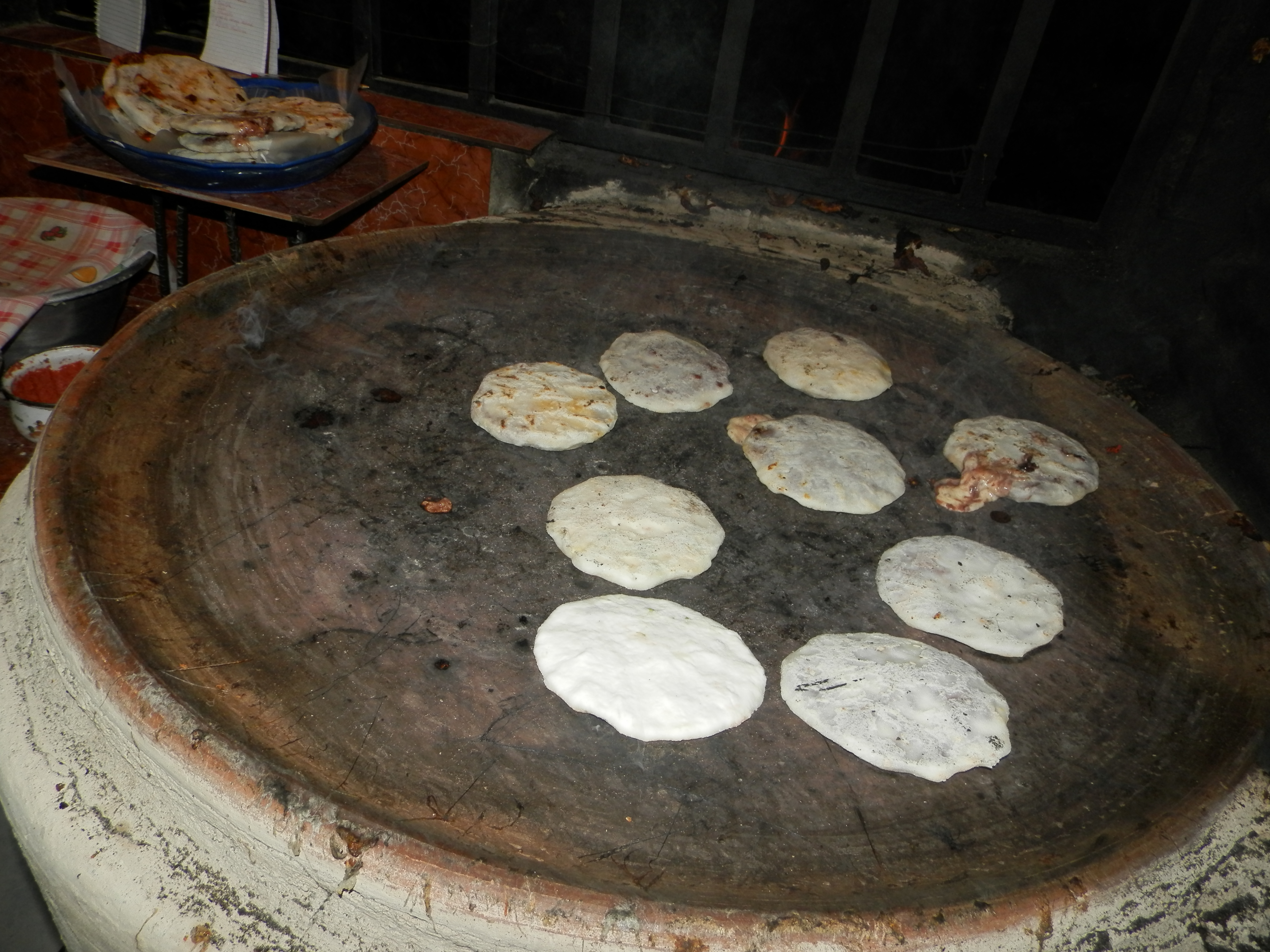

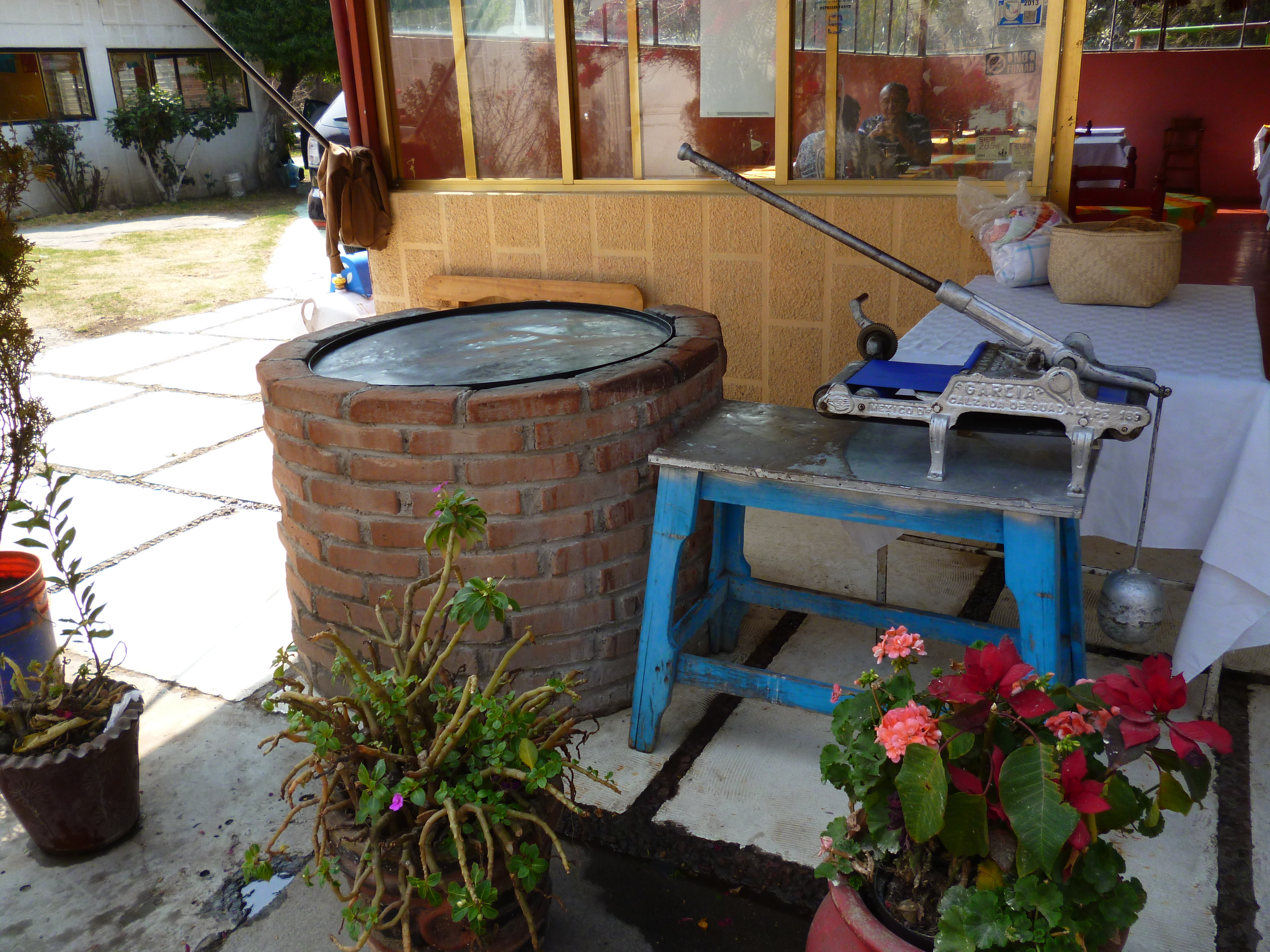

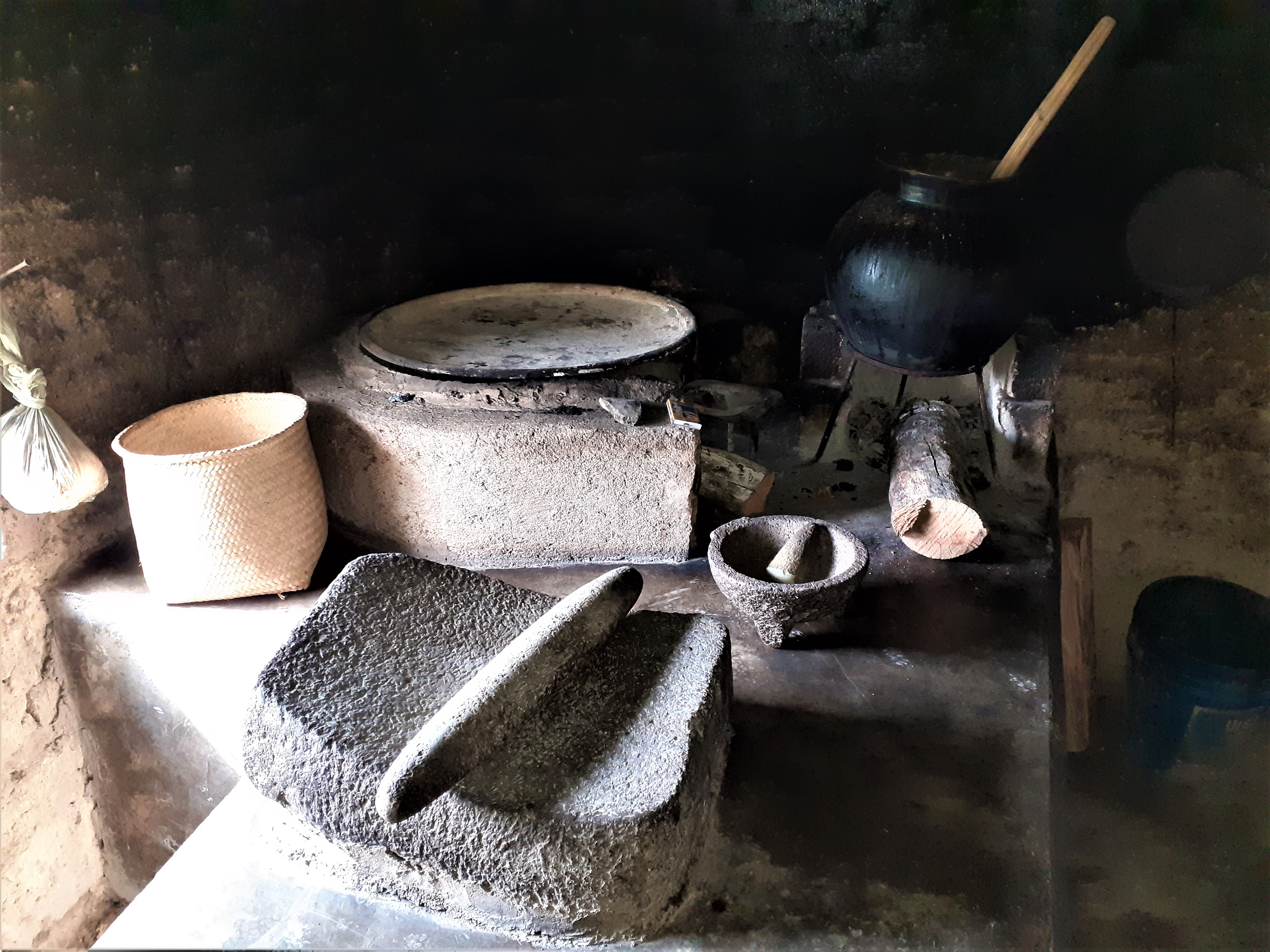

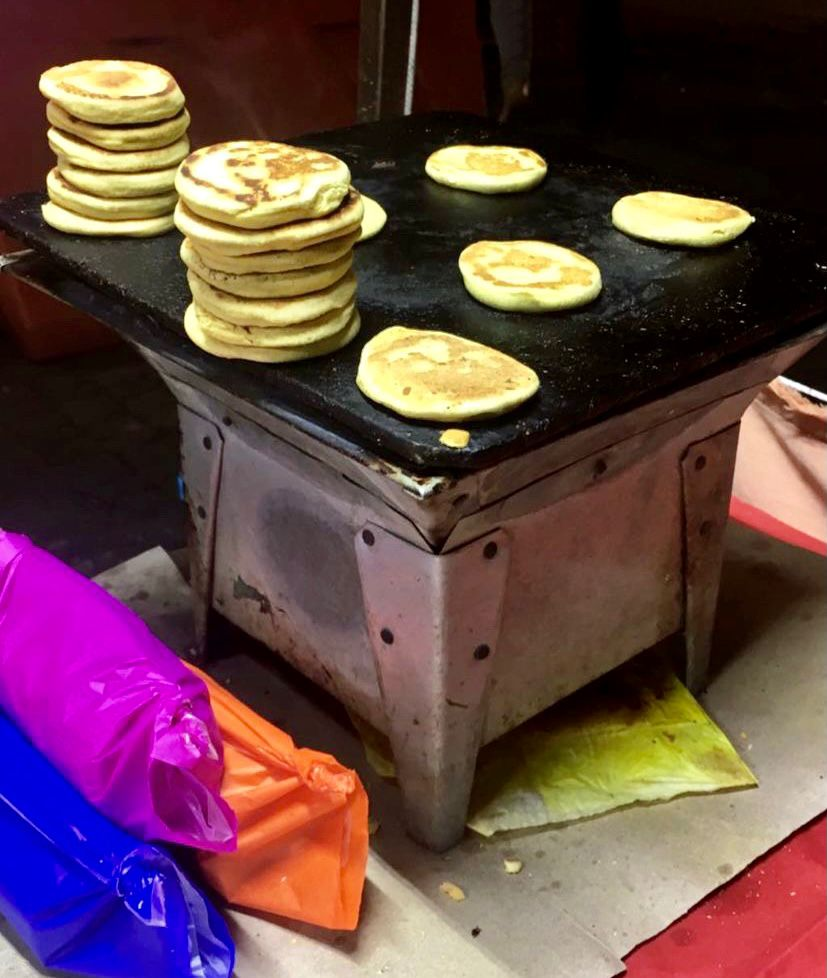

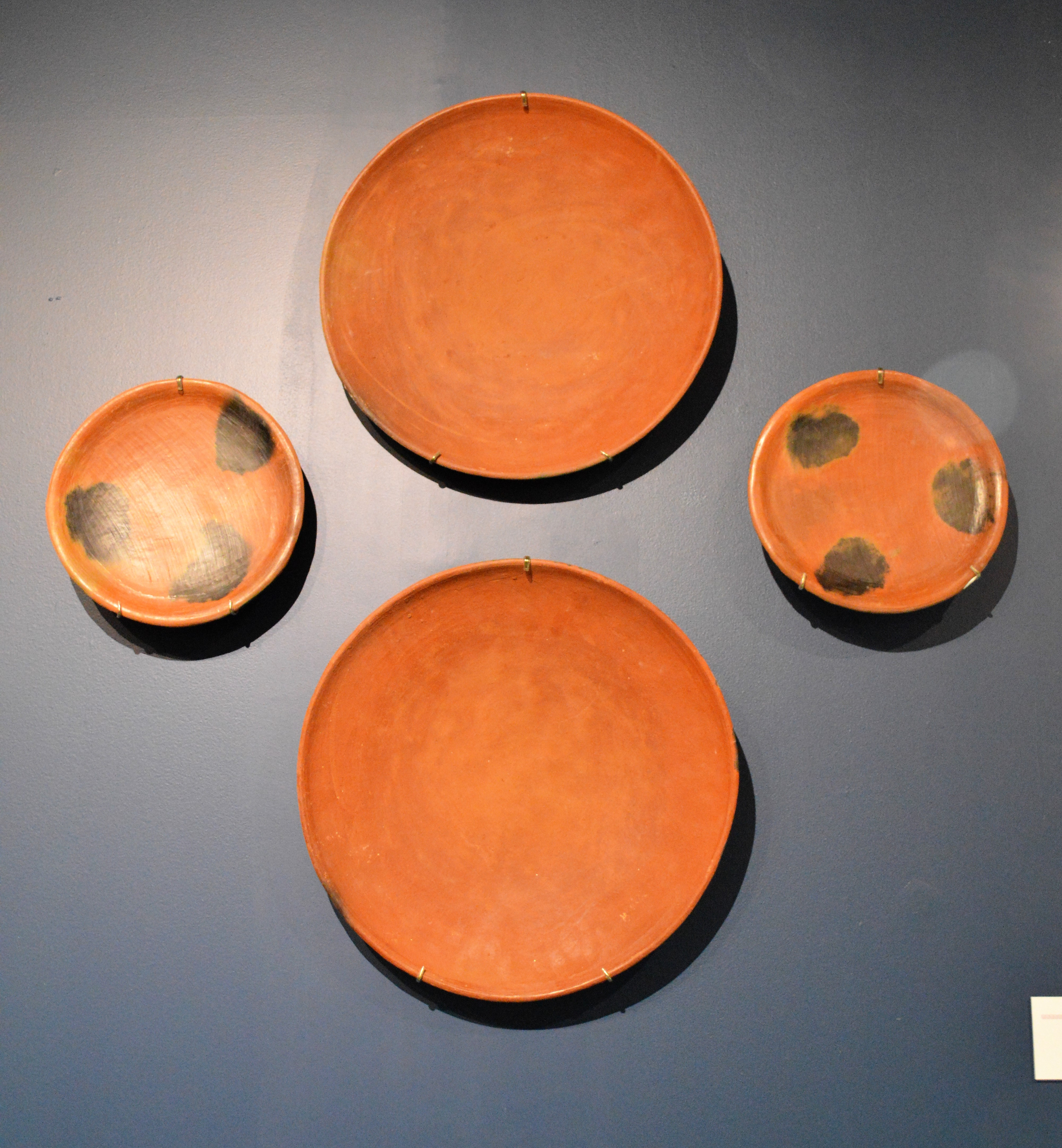

== See also ==
- Tava or tawa
- Mitad and mogogo, baking surfaces for Ethiopian injera bread
