= Tava =

Disc-shaped frying pan originating from the Indian subcontinent

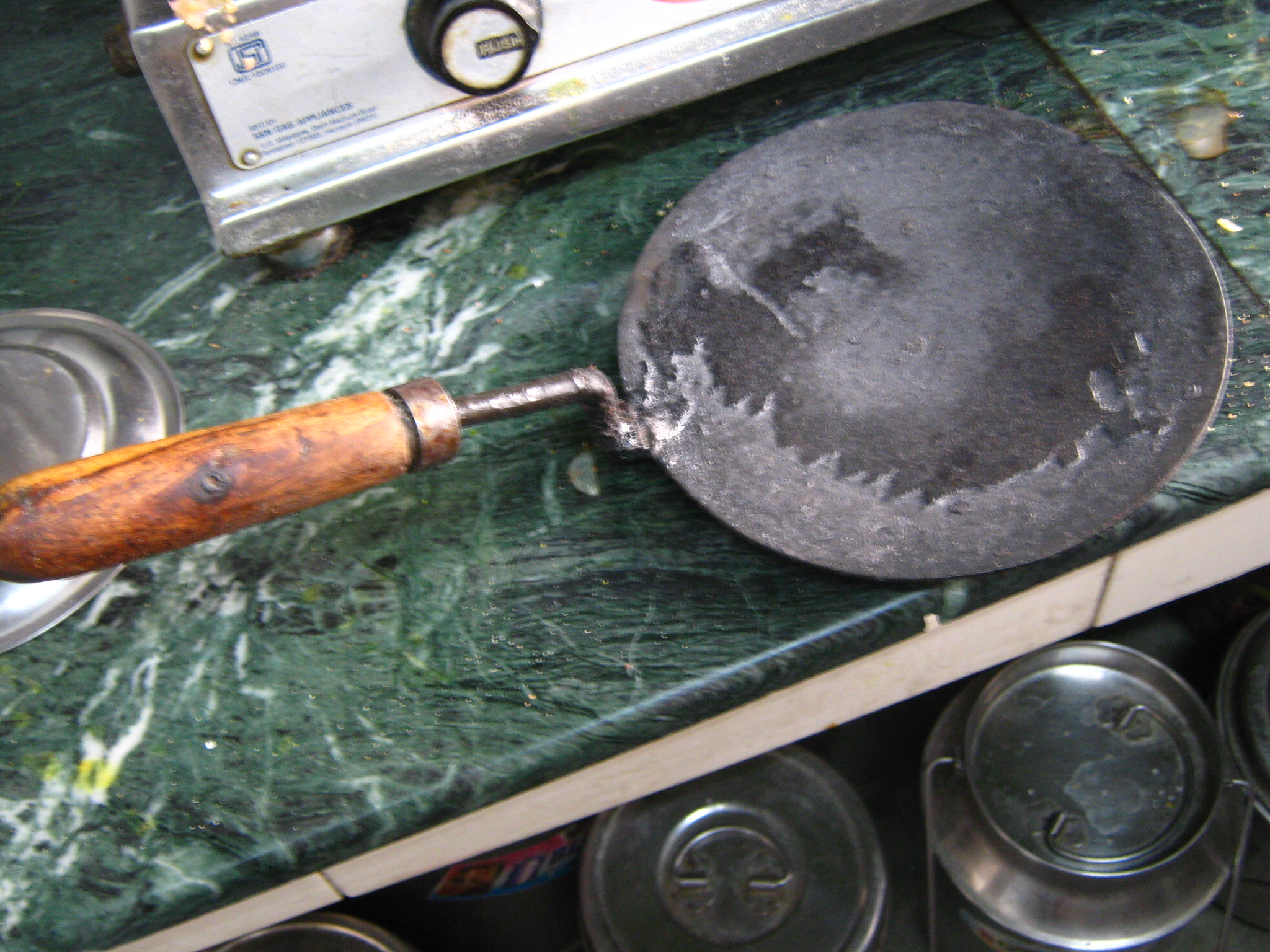
A concave tawa designed for use in a home kitchen

The tava(h) / tawa(h) (IPA: [t̪əʋaː], mainly on the Indian subcontinent), saj (IPA: [sˁɑːdʒ]in Arabic), sac (IPA: [sadʒ], in Turkish), and other variations, is a metal cooking utensil. It is round and usually curved: the concave side is used as a wok or frying pan, the convex side for cooking flatbreads and pancakes. There are also flat tawas.

The Indian tava might have a handle or not, and it can be made of cast iron, aluminium, or carbon steel. It may be enameled or given a non-stick surface. The tawa and saj are used in the cuisines of South, Central, and West Asia, as well as of the Balkans. The tawa is also used in Indo-Caribbean cuisine.

== Names by region ==
=== Taaba, tava, tawa ===
In Iran, the Persian word tāve (تاوه) is used which is derived from the Persian word taaba which means something that is curved or tempered. The root word taab in Persian is a verb which means to bend or temper or curve (but see here-below for the use of saj in Iran). It is cognate with tawaa, a word which in nearly all Indo-Aryan languages such as Punjabi, Hindi and Urdu means cooking pan. In Afghanistan, the curved cast-iron utensil used for cooking bread is known as tawah, but in Pashto it is more popularly known as tabakhey (تبخے/طبخی). The Georgian cognate is tapa (ტაფა).

=== Saj, sac ===
Saj (Arabic: صاج, lit. 'sheet-metal') is the equivalent of tava in Arabic, with the equivalent sac in Turkish, and is used in Southwest Asia. The name "sac" comes from Old Turkish "sāç". In Iran, saj is used for the curved iron plate employed in cooking bread (but see here-above for the use of tāve in Iran).

=== Variants, change of meaning ===
The word tava is also used in Turkish and all across the Balkans, and refers to any kind of frying pan. In Serbia and Bulgaria, however, a тава (tava) is a metal baking tray with raised margins (for the meaning of sach in those same countries, see here-below). In Romanian and Albanian too, tava and "tavë" can mean baking tray, such as employed for baking in an oven, but it can also mean tray, such as used for serving food and drink.

The sač is a saj-shaped lid used as a cooking utensil in the Balkans. In Serbia and Bulgaria, the flat ceramic сач (sach) or сачѐ (sachè) is used for tabletop cooking of thin slices of vegetables and meat (for the meaning of tava in those same countries, see here-above).

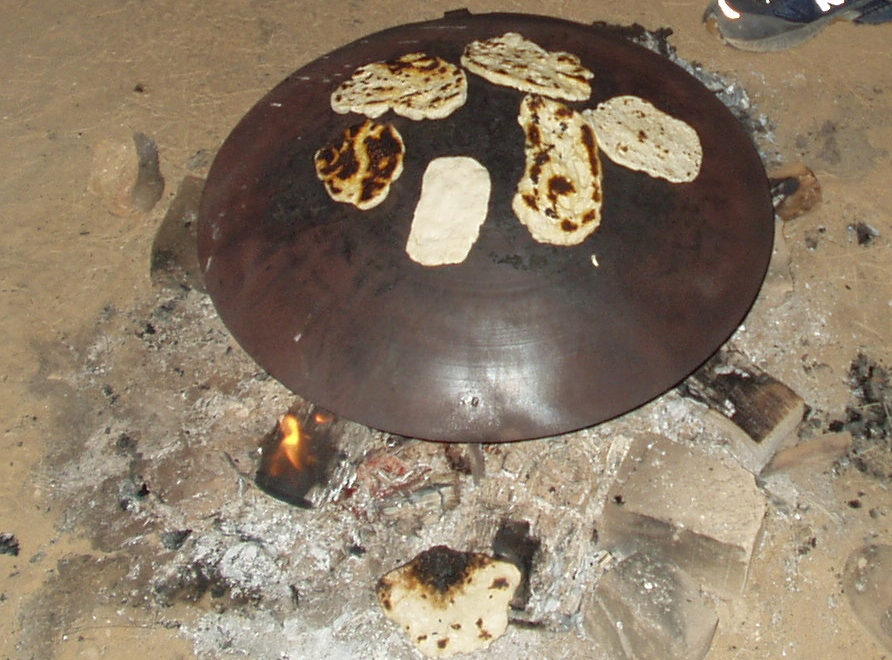
Pita being baked on a convex saj

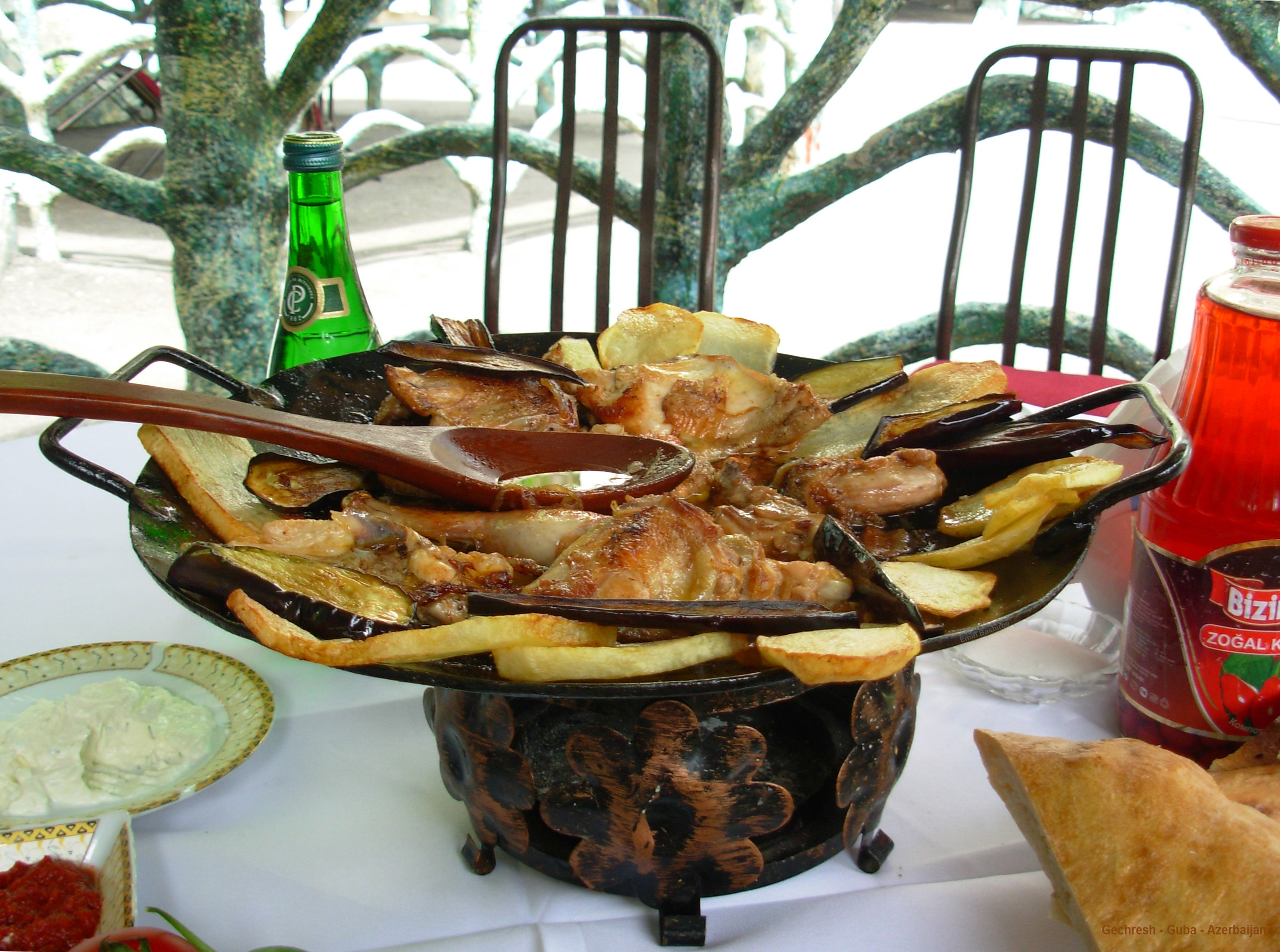
Reversible Azerbaijani sac with handles

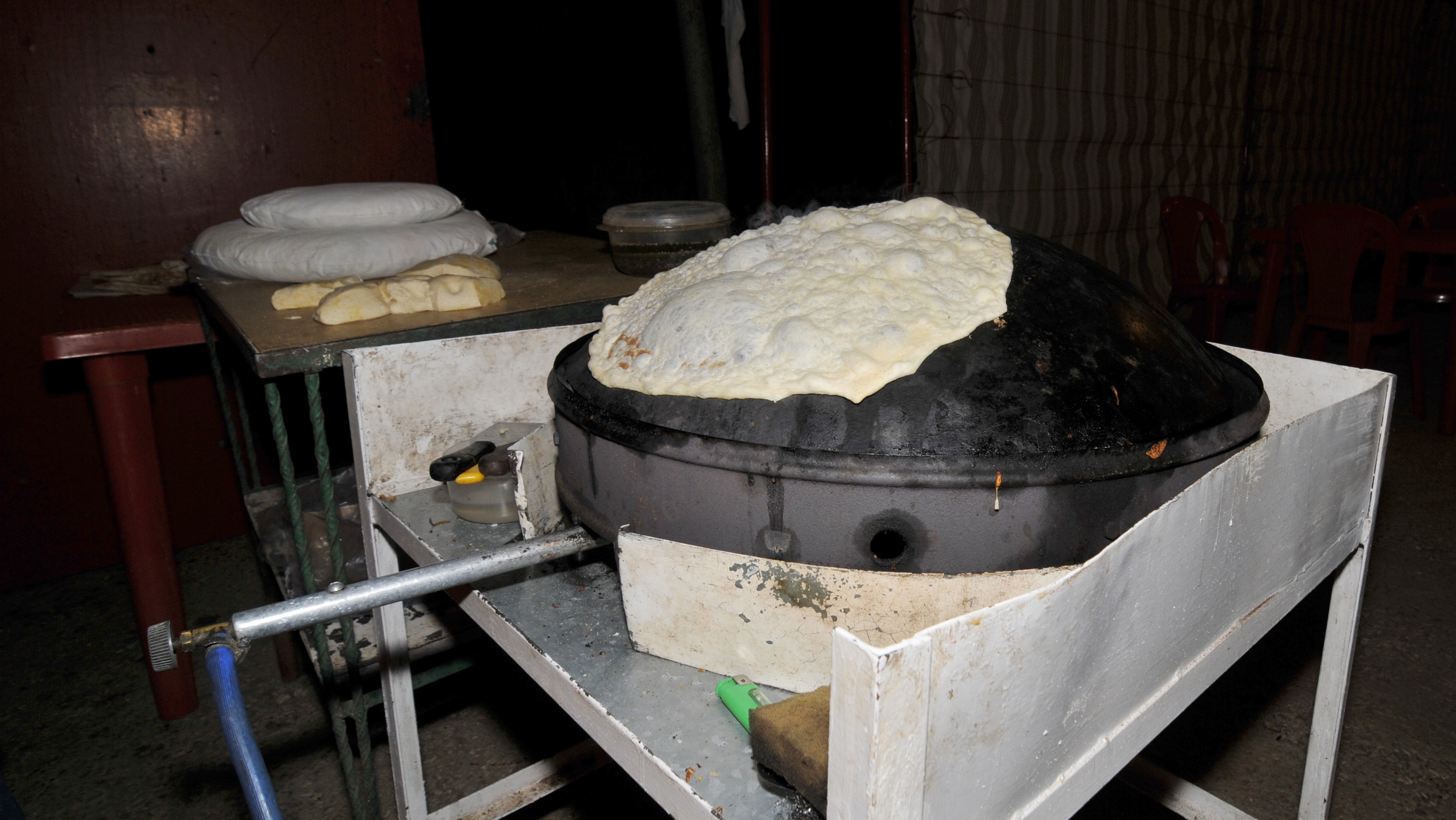
Markouk being baked on a convex saj

== Uses ==
A tava or saj is used to bake a variety of leavened and unleavened flatbreads and pancakes across the broad region: pita, naan, saj bread, roti, chapati, paratha, dosa, and pesarattu. In Pakistan, especially in rural areas, large convex saj are used to cook several breads at the same time or to make rumali roti.

In Turkey and the Levant, a saj is used to make the starch wafers used in güllaç.

Besides making bread, a tava or saj can be used as a pan to cook meat and vegetables, or other foods. For example, sajiyeh (Arabic: صاجية) is a dish made by frying meat and vegetables (typically bell peppers) in olive oil on a saj, popular in Jordan and Palestine.

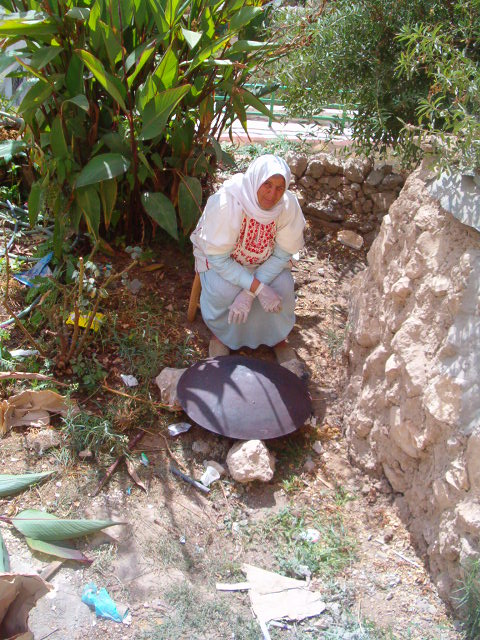
A Palestinian woman baking markook on a saj in a West Bank village

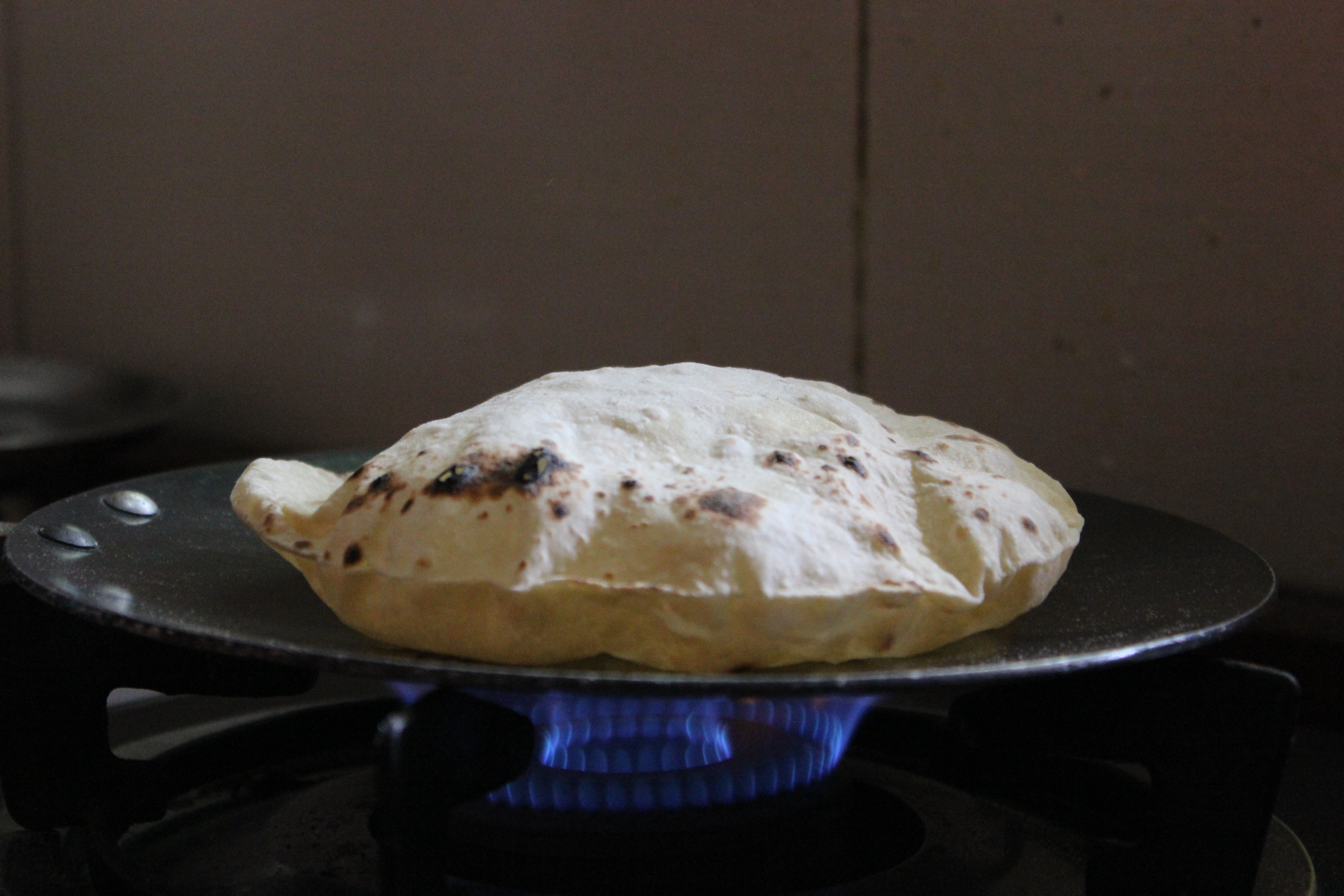
A roti being baked on a tava

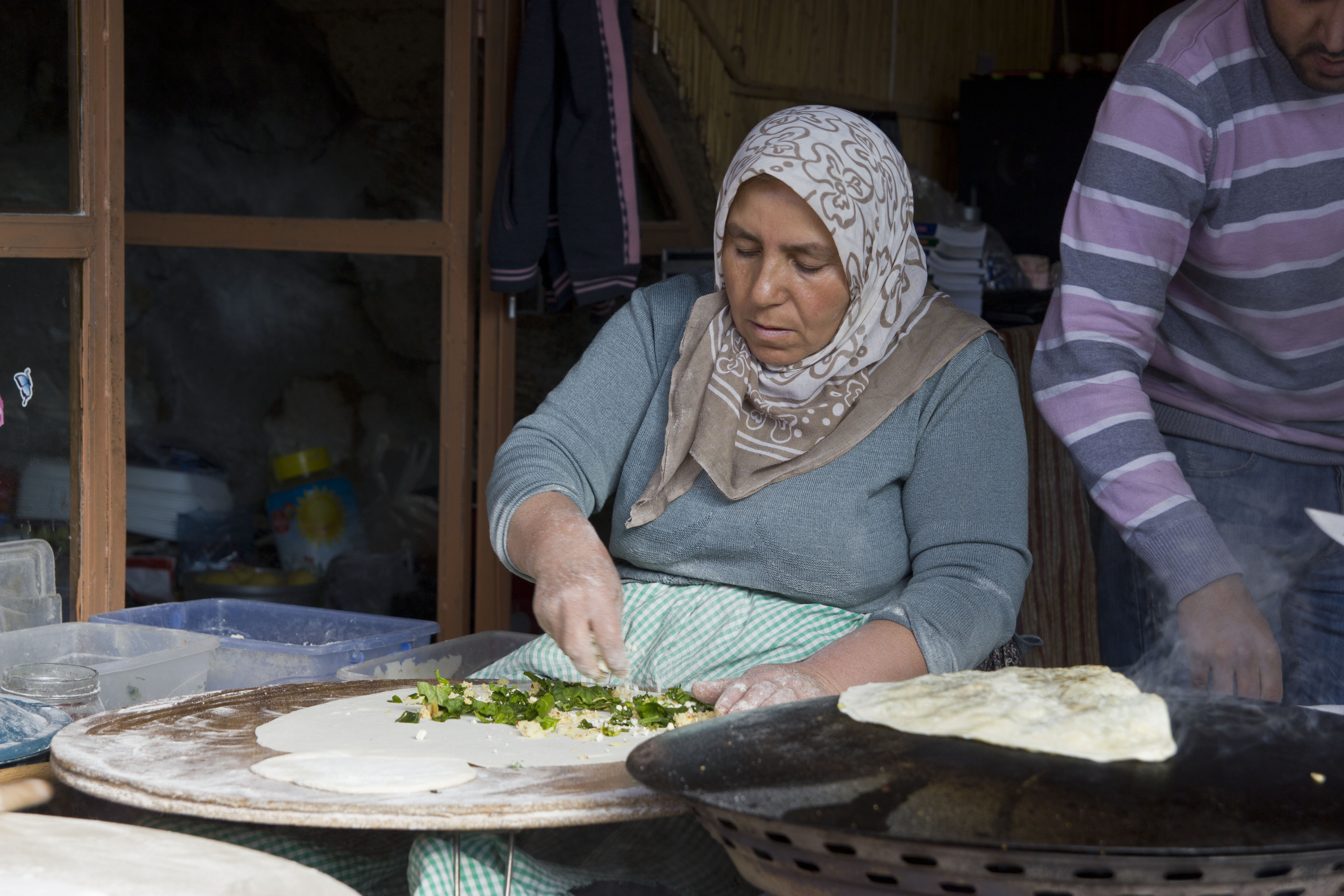
Gözleme, a filled bread, being baked on a sac

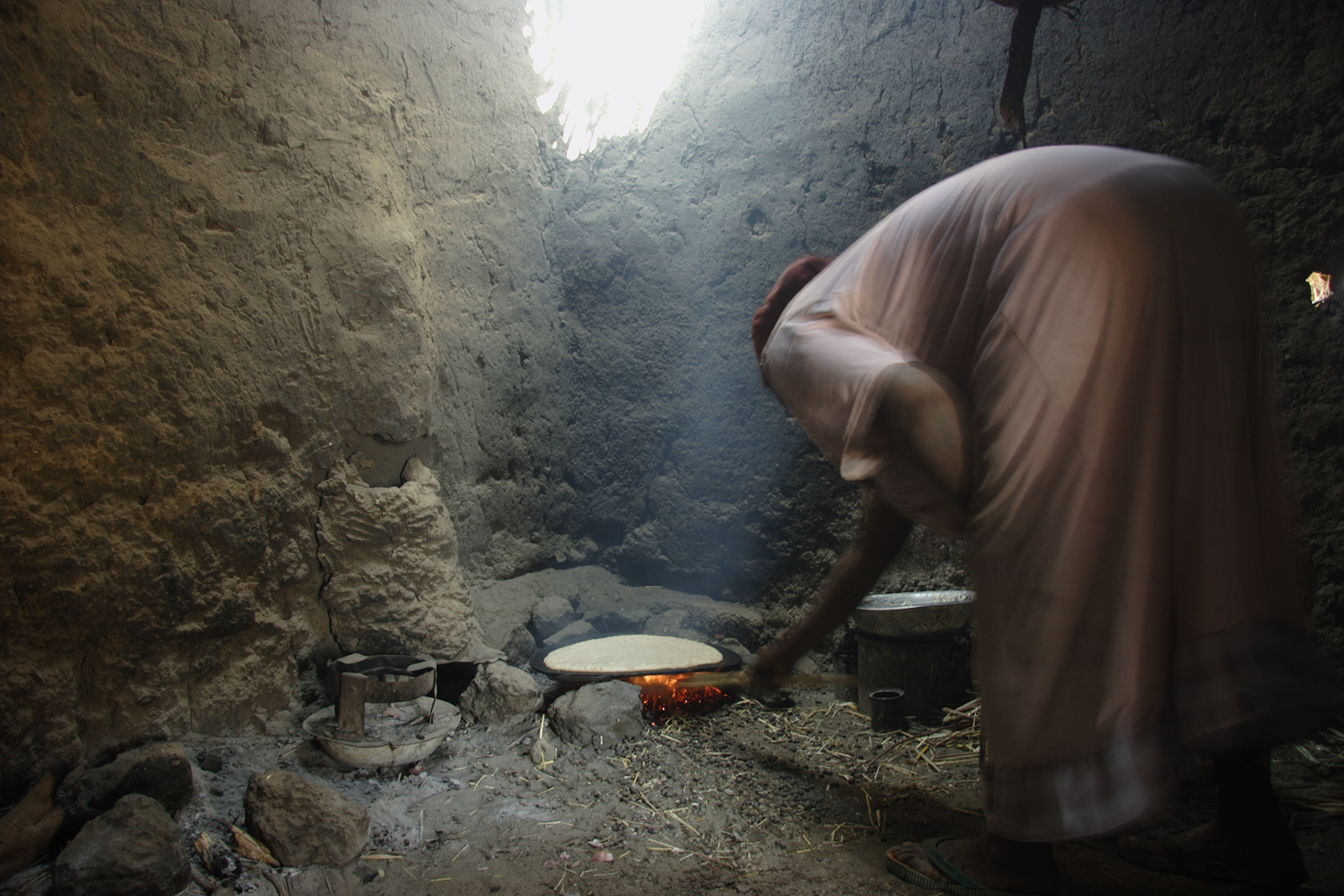
Manasir woman preparing qurasah (قراصة), the daily bread on Sherari Island in Dar al-Manasir in Northern Sudan

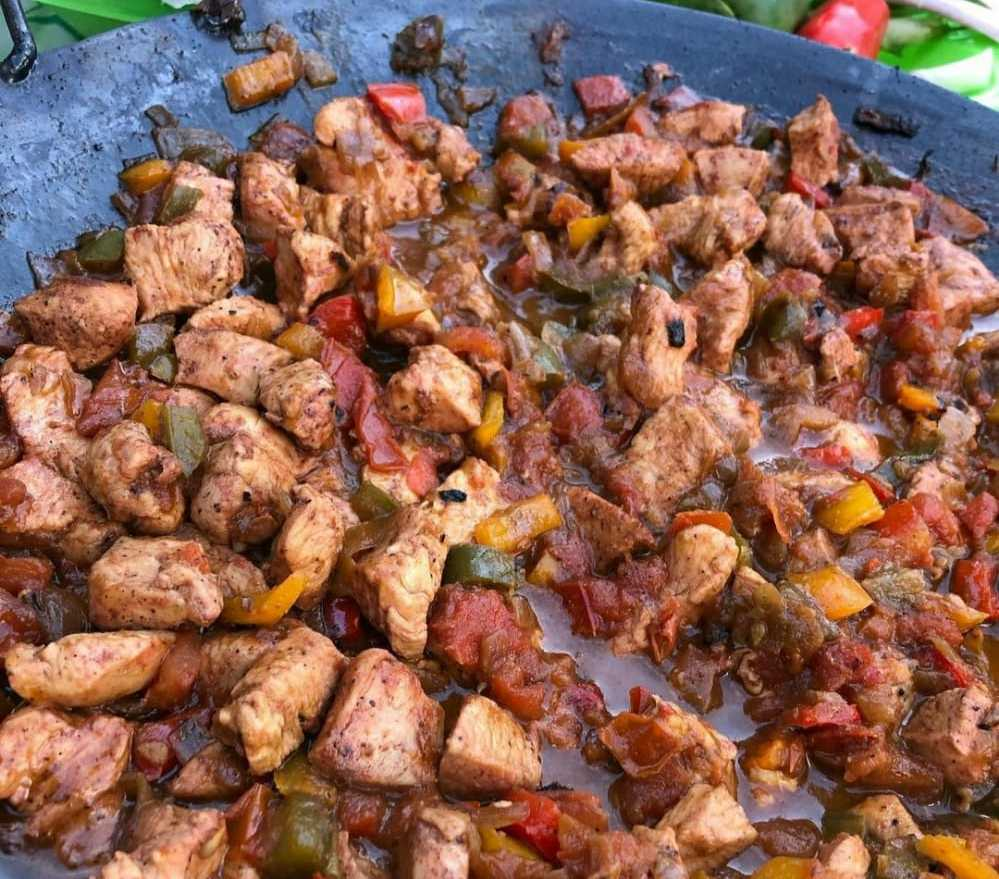
Sajiyeh in Jordan, made from chicken and vegetables
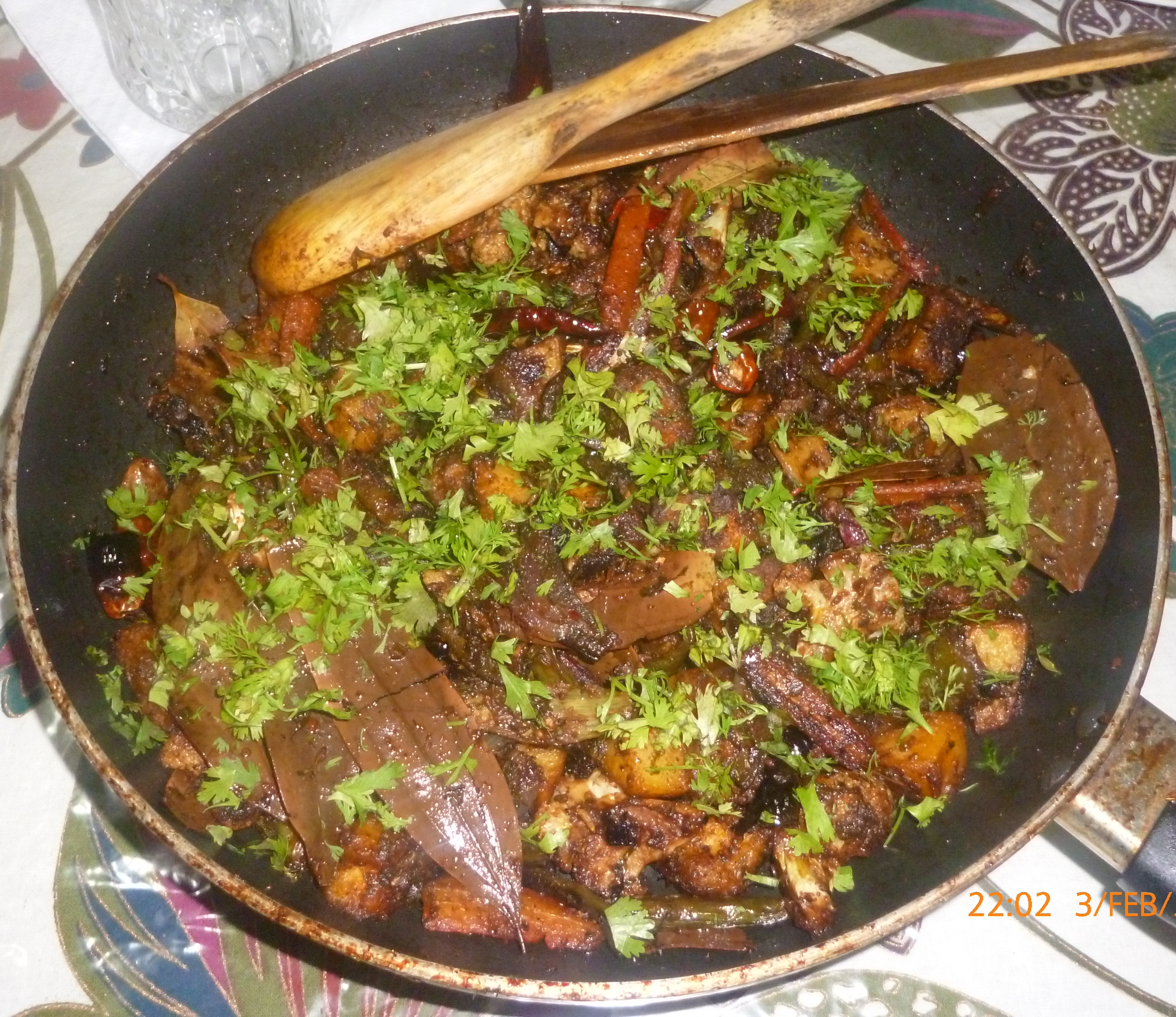
Vegetables fried in a tawa

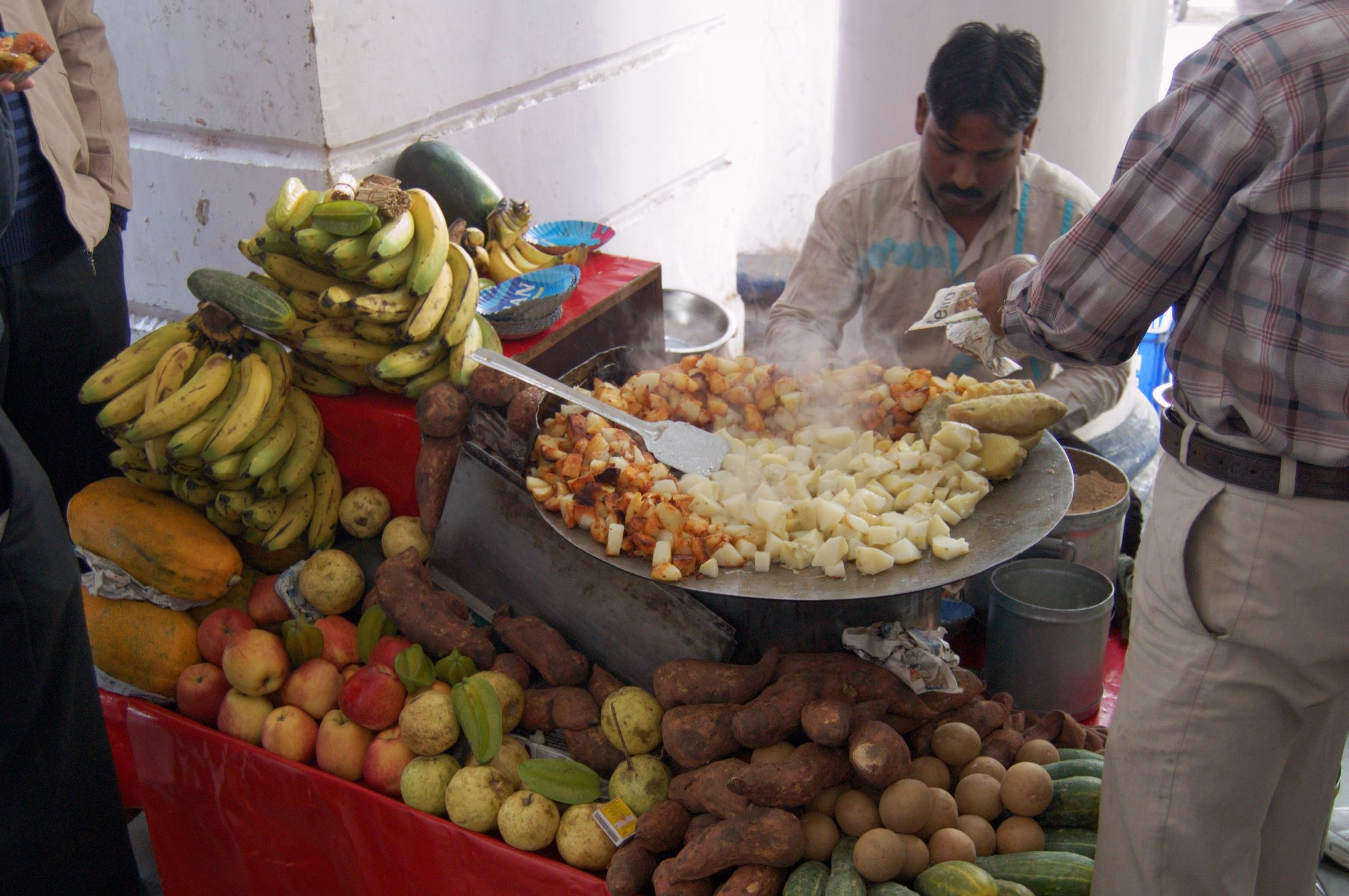
Aloo chaat being cooked in a large tava

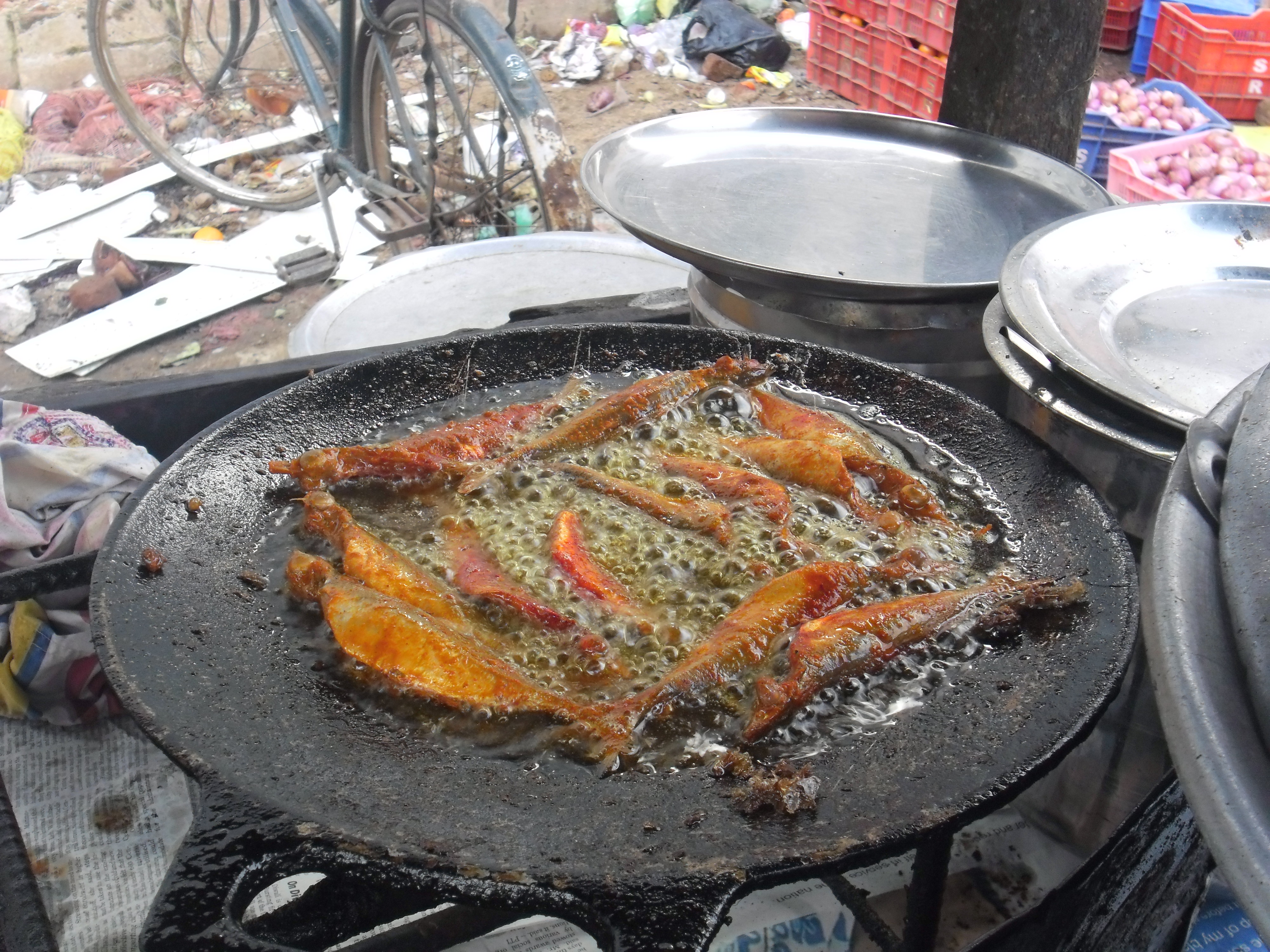
Fish frying in a tawa

== See also ==
- Comal (cookware), a similar utensil in Mexican cuisine
- Karahi, a similar utensil in Indian cuisine
- Mittad
- Griddle, a flat cast iron used in frying
- Skillet, a frying pan with a long handle
- Mongolian barbecue, a Taiwanese grill dish sometimes using a saj-like frying pan
- List of cooking vessels

== Sources ==
- "Your Desi (Indian) Kitchen on the Net". Archived from the original on 2008-04-08.
- "Pots, Pans, and Griddles". Archived from the original on 2008-10-14.
- "A Fork on the Road". - Miami Herald online.
- "Saj Femmes". Blog: Land and People. 2007-09-23.
