= Lady M =

Lady M may refer to:

- Lady M (boutique), a luxury confections brand
- Lady M (yacht), a super-yacht
- A Blonde Redhead song on the Barragán (album)
