= Krampouz =

Manufacturer of cooking appliances

Krampouz S.A.S.
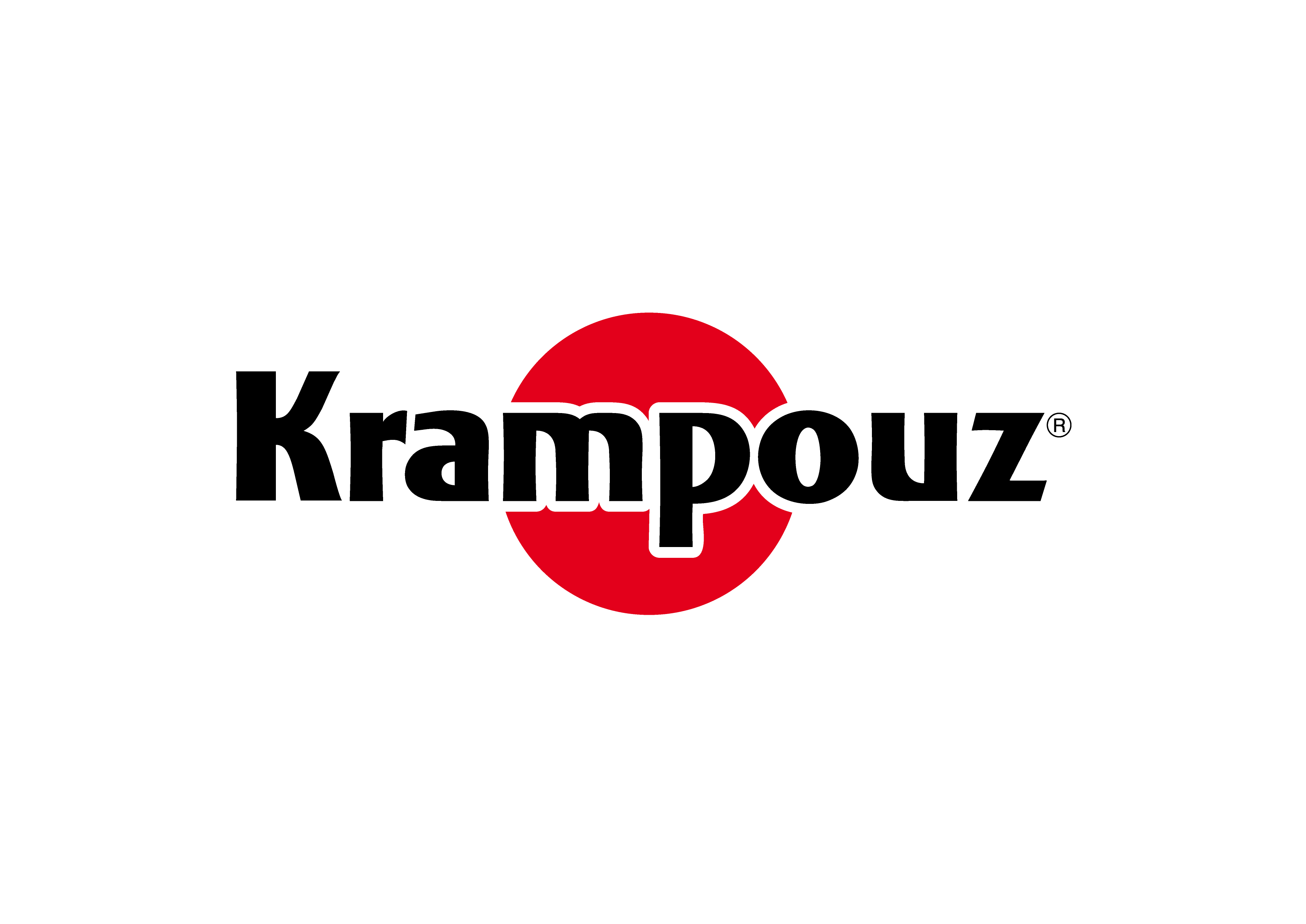
- Company type: Subsidiary
- Founded: 1949 in Pouldreuzic
- Founder: Jean-Marie Bosser
- Headquarters: Pluguffan, Brittany, France
- Key people: Serge Kergoat
- Number of employees: 90 (2019)

Krampouz is a French manufacturer of domestic and professional cooking appliances. Founded in 1949 in Pouldreuzic, in Brittany, it is most well known for its range of crepe makers, but the company also produces waffle makers, panini grills, and planchas. The name Krampouz is derived from the Breton word krampouezh, meaning crepe.

== Early history ==
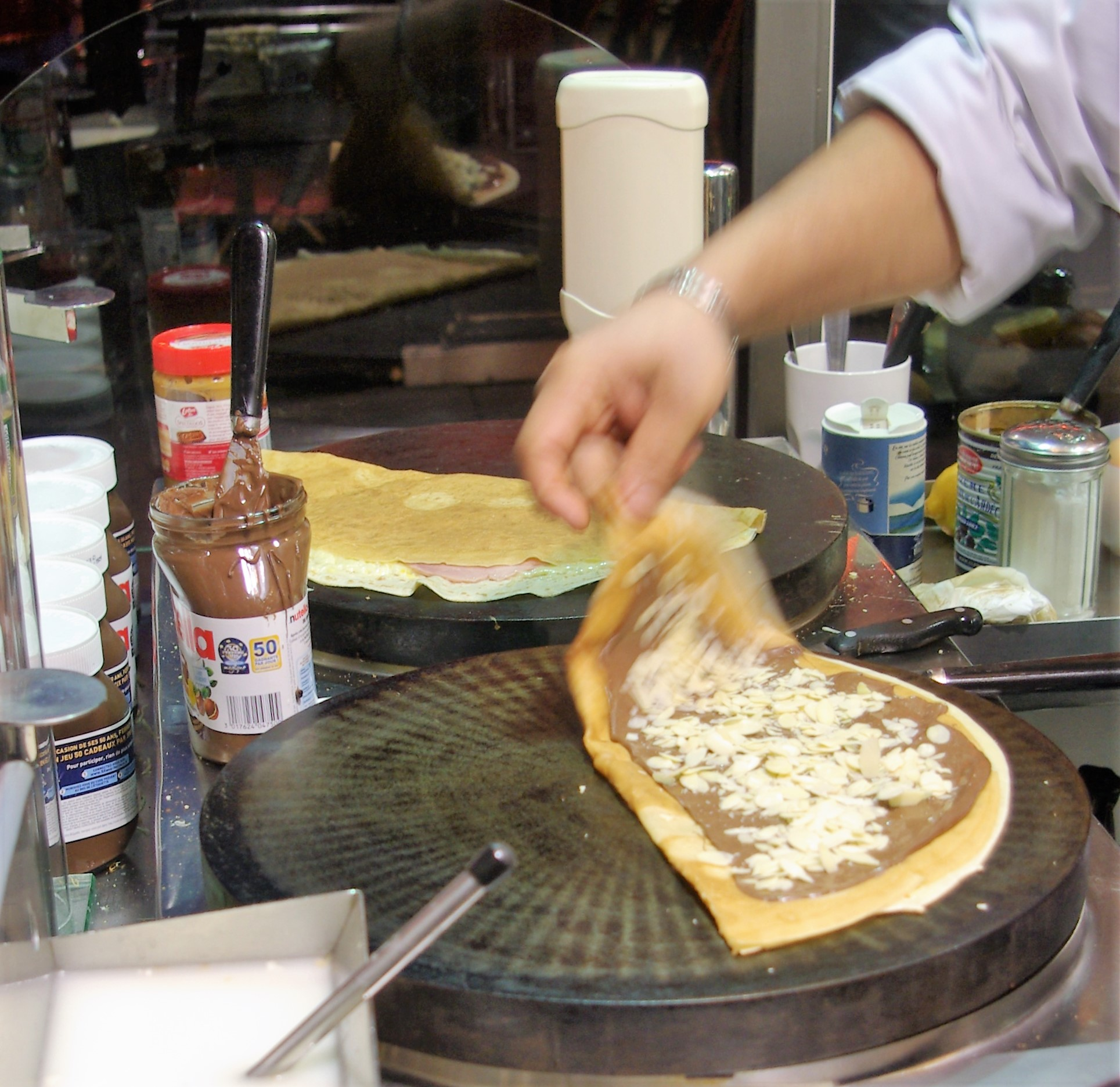
Krampouz crepe makers in use in a Parisian crêperie

Shortly after manufacturing for a friend, a first experimental cast-iron electric crepe griddle in 1945, electrician Jean-Marie Bosser decided to launch his own crepe maker manufacturing company. Krampouz was thus created in 1949. The company first developed a full range of professional electric crepe makers for which it instantly became - and ever since remained - a leader worldwide. Krampouz then, later on introduced professional gas crepe makers as well as domestic electric crepe makers.

After Jean-Marie Bosser's departure, his son Michel took over the business. He expanded the company, which relocated in 2001 to a 3,000 m² facility in Pluguffan.'

== Current situation ==
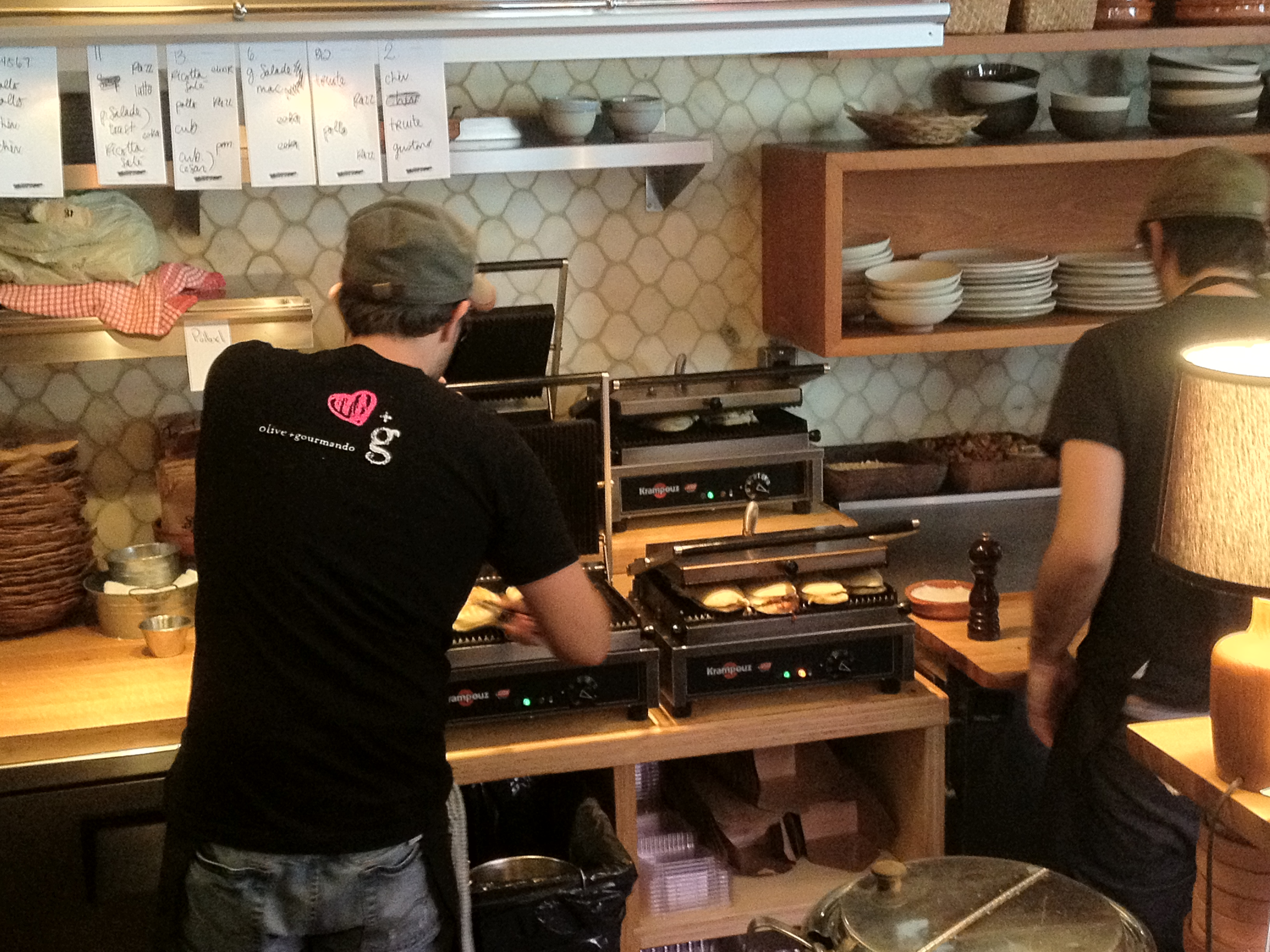
Professional cast-iron panini machines in a Montreal coffee shop

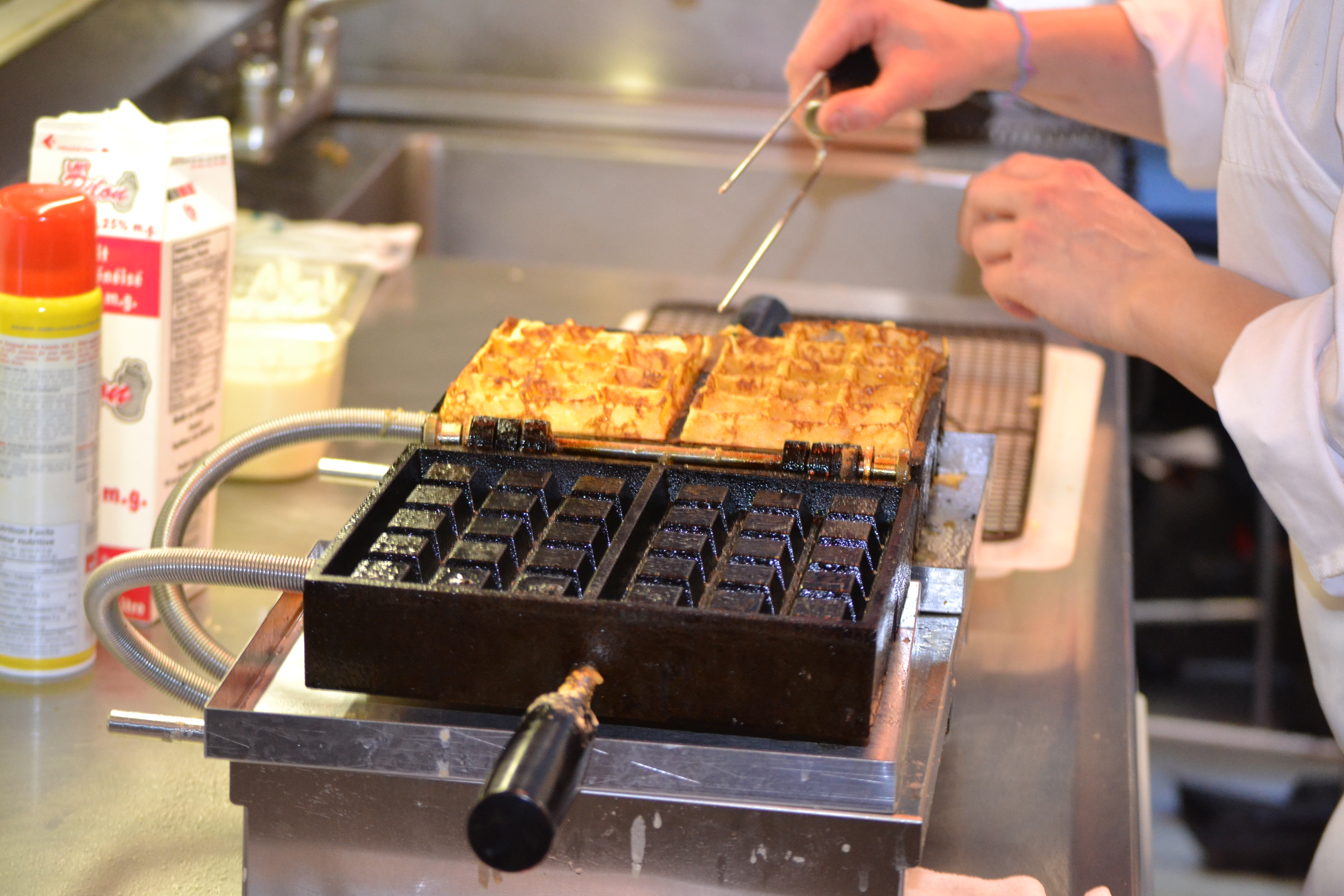
Belgian waffle maker in use during the gastronomy competition of the Montreal Highlights Festival

After the acquisition at the end of the twentieth century, of a Belgian waffle maker manufacturer's trademark, Krampouz introduced a full range of cast-iron waffle makers. This line of products was then completely redesigned and brought to a new standard through innovation. New Krampouz waffle makers produced a breakthrough on the markets with the introduction of Easy Clean System (patented). This innovation allows users to detach irons from the machine to clean them. The company then developed more new products, adding Easy Clean panini machines and carts to its commercial range.

In the mid 2000s Krampouz added griddles named planchas to its residential and commercial ranges. Serge Kergoat became CEO in 2006 and Krampouz developed a new strategy focusing on increasing its presence in foreign markets.

2013 company turnover is 12.3m€. As of 2013, Krampouz products are sold by 200 distributors in more than 150 countries.

In 2019, Krampouz was acquired by Groupe SEB.
