= Crêpe =

Thin pancake in French cuisine

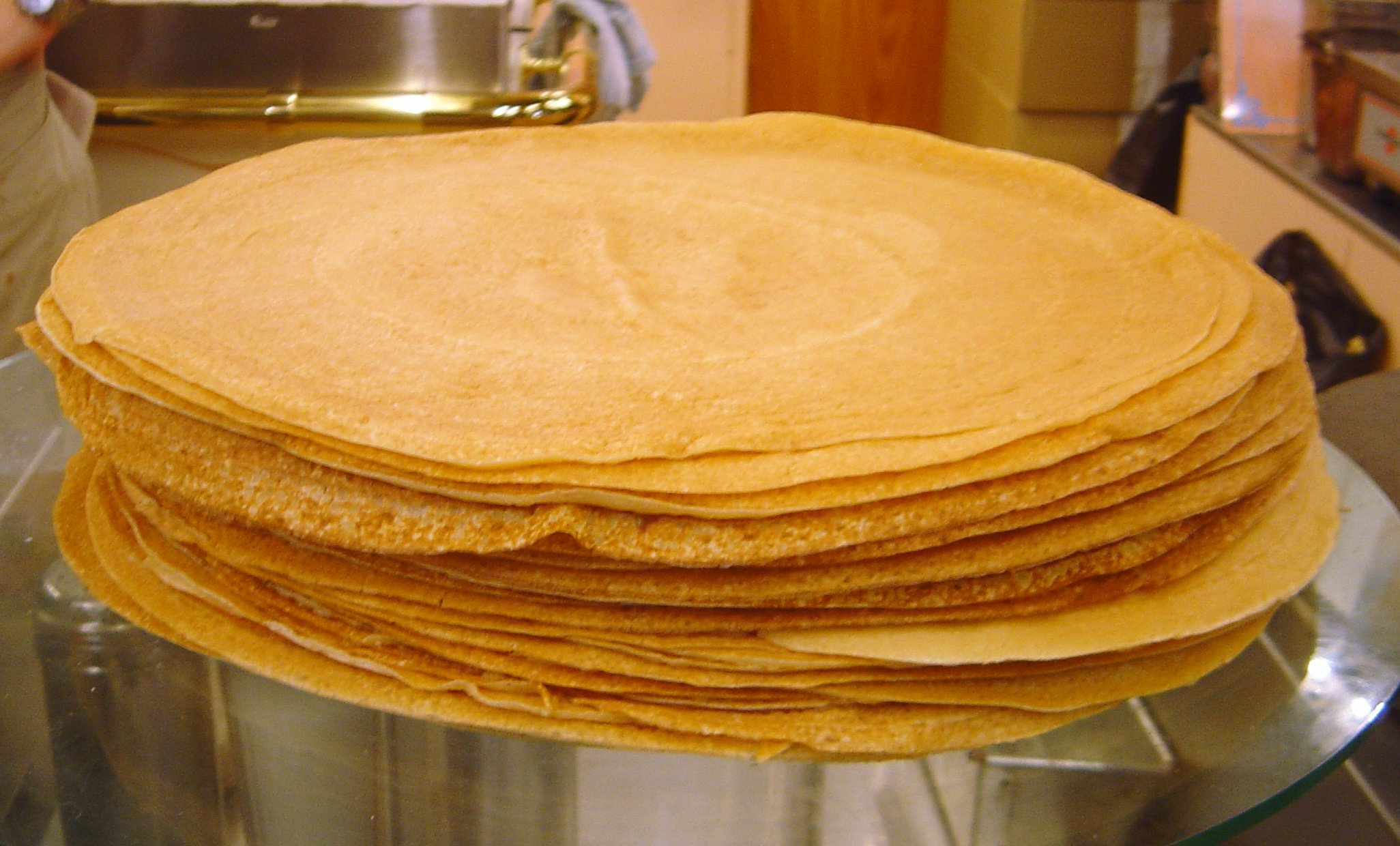
- A stack of crêpes
- Alternative names: Crepe
- Type: Pancake
- Place of origin: Roman Empire
- Main ingredients: Wheat flour, milk, eggs, butter, sugar and/or salt

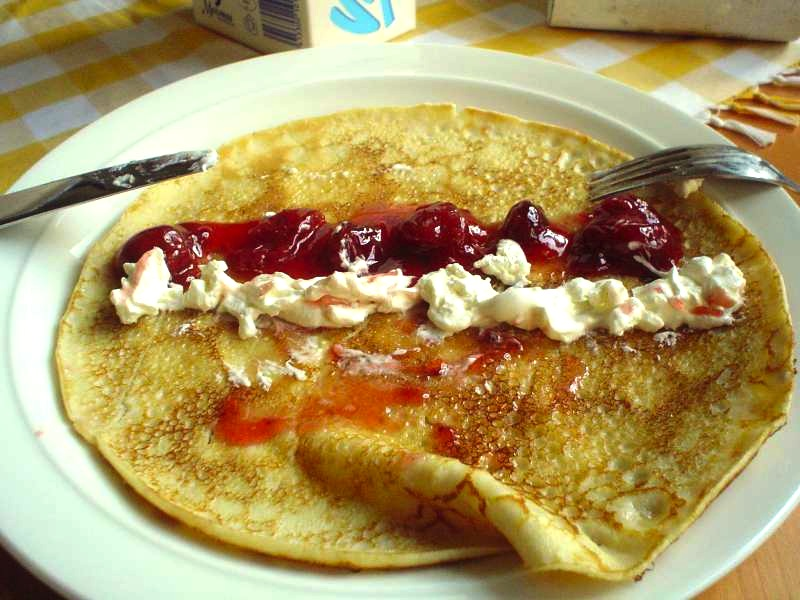
A sweet crêpe opened up, with whipped cream and strawberry sauce on it

A crêpe (/kreɪp/ KRAYP or /krɛp/ KREP, French: [kʁɛp], Quebec French: [kʁaɪ̯p]) is a dish made from unleavened batter or dough that is cooked on a frying pan or a griddle. Crêpes are usually one of two varieties: sweet crêpes (crêpes sucrées) or savoury crêpes (galettes; crêpes salées). They are often served with a wide variety of fillings such as cheese, fruit, vegetables, meats, and a variety of spreads. Crêpes can also be flambéed, such as in Crêpes Suzette.

== Etymology ==
The French term "crêpe" derives from crispa, the feminine version of the Latin word crispus, which means "curled, wrinkled, having curly hair."

== Traditions ==
In France, crêpes are traditionally served on the Christian holiday La Chandeleur (Candlemas), on February 2. On that day in 472, Pope Gelasius I offered crepes as sacramental bread to French pilgrims that were visiting Rome for the Chandeleur. The sacramental bread was replaced by crêpes in France, and the day became known as "Le Jour des Crêpes" ("The Day of the Crêpes"). The day is also celebrated by many as the day that marks the transition from winter to spring (similar to the North American tradition of Groundhog Day), with the golden colour and circular shape of crêpes representing the sun and the circle of life.

There are a few superstitions around the preparation of crêpes for Le Jour des Crêpes.

One example involves holding a gold coin (such as a Louis d'or) or ring in the left hand while successfully flipping a crêpe in a pan with the right hand. It is said to bring a person wealth in the upcoming year (other variations describe a year of good weather).

Another version of the tradition involves cooking a crêpe with a gold coin on top. Some hide the first crêpe in a drawer instead of eating it for good luck in the coming year. Eating and sharing crêpes with others on Candlemas is another tradition based on popes giving food to the poor every year on February 2.

A traditional rhyming French proverb describes the tradition of eating crêpes on Candlemas: “manger des crêpes à la chandeleur apporte un an de bonheur” (eating crêpes on Candlemas brings a year of happiness).

== Types ==
Sweet crêpes are generally made with wheat flour (farine de blé). When sweet, they can be eaten as part of breakfast or as a dessert. Common fillings include hazelnut cocoa spread, preserves, sugar (granulated or powdered), maple syrup, golden syrup, lemon juice, whipped cream, fruit spreads, custard, and sliced soft fruits or confiture.

Savoury crêpes can be made with non-wheat flours such as buckwheat. A normal savoury crêpe recipe includes using wheat flour but omitting the sugar. Batter made from buckwheat flour is gluten-free, which makes it possible for people who have a wheat allergy or gluten intolerance to eat this type of crêpe. Common savoury fillings for crêpes are cheese, ham, and eggs, ratatouille, mushrooms, artichoke (in certain regions), and various meat products.

Batters can also consist of other ingredients such as butter, milk, water, eggs, flour, salt, and sugar. Fillings are commonly added to the centre of the crêpe and served with the edges partially folded over the centre. An Indian variety of the crêpe uses a multi-grain flour called "bhajanee," eggs, curd, and an assortment of spices as its ingredients. It is a modern variation of an Indian dish called Thalipeeth.

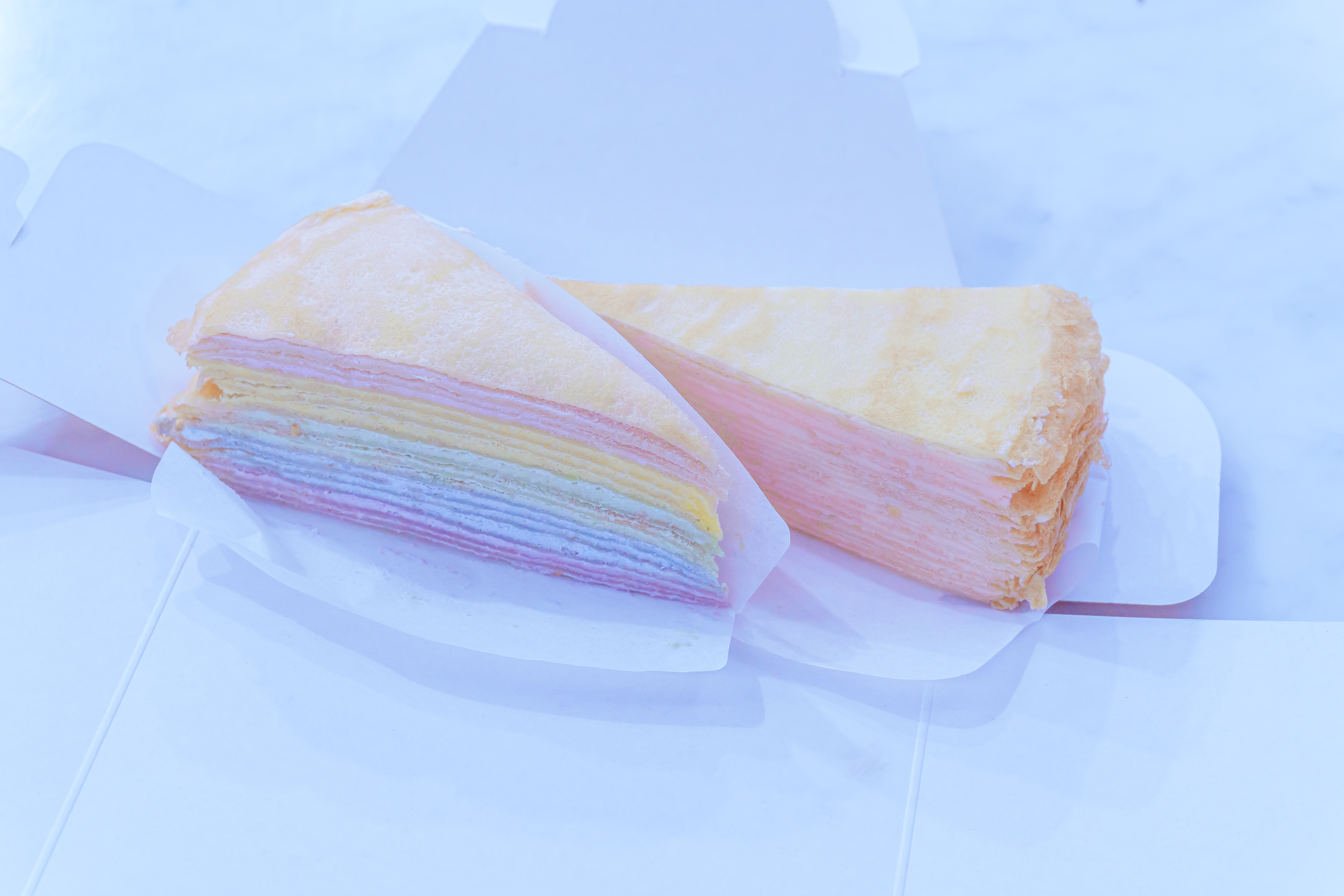
Slices of "mille-crêpe" cakes from Taiwan

Crêpes can also be made into crepe cakes by stacking plain crepes on top of each other, adding a layer of filling between the layers. Fruits, chocolate, cookies, marshmallow, etc., can be added. Most crêpe cakes are sweet and considered dessert. They can also replace the traditional birthday cake. Crêpe cakes are usually 15–30 layers, and the crêpes used are very thin and soft.

A cake made with layers of crêpes with a filling in between is called “gâteau de crêpes” or “ミルクレープ(mille-crêpes)” (a Japanese-made French word combining crêpes and mille-feuille). This French pâtisserie, was popularised by Emy Wada, a pâtissière who studied in France and operated Paper Moon Cake Boutiques in Japan, in the 1980s. In 2001, she expanded to New York City, where she supplied crêpe cakes to popular chains Dean & DeLuca and Takashimaya through the company Lady M.

== Recipe ==
Video demonstration of preparing crêpes

The standard recipe for French crêpe calls for flour, eggs, milk, salt, and butter. Sugar is optional. In the industrial production of crêpes, the dry ingredients are combined with eggs to form a dough. The rest of the wet ingredients are then added to thin the batter to a loose enough consistency to spread easily. The batter is added, one ladle at a time, to a hot, greased pan, cooked until golden, then flipped. Crêpe batter is characterised by its liquidity, making it easy to spread in a thin layer. Crêpes are also characterised by their quick cooking time, usually 20–30 seconds per side.

In older versions of crêpe recipes, beer or wine was used instead of milk. Buckwheat flour is often used as well, specifically in making a Breton Galette.

== Crêperies ==
A crêperie (French: [kʁɛpʁi]) may be a takeaway restaurant or stall, serving crêpes as a form of fast food or street food, or it may be a more formal sit-down restaurant or café. Crêperies can be found throughout France, especially in Brittany, and in many other countries. Many also serve apple cider, a popular drink to accompany crêpes.

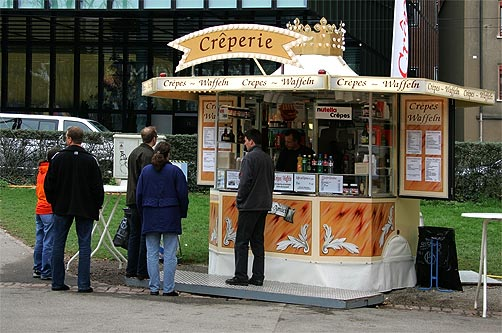
A small crêperie in Basel, Switzerland

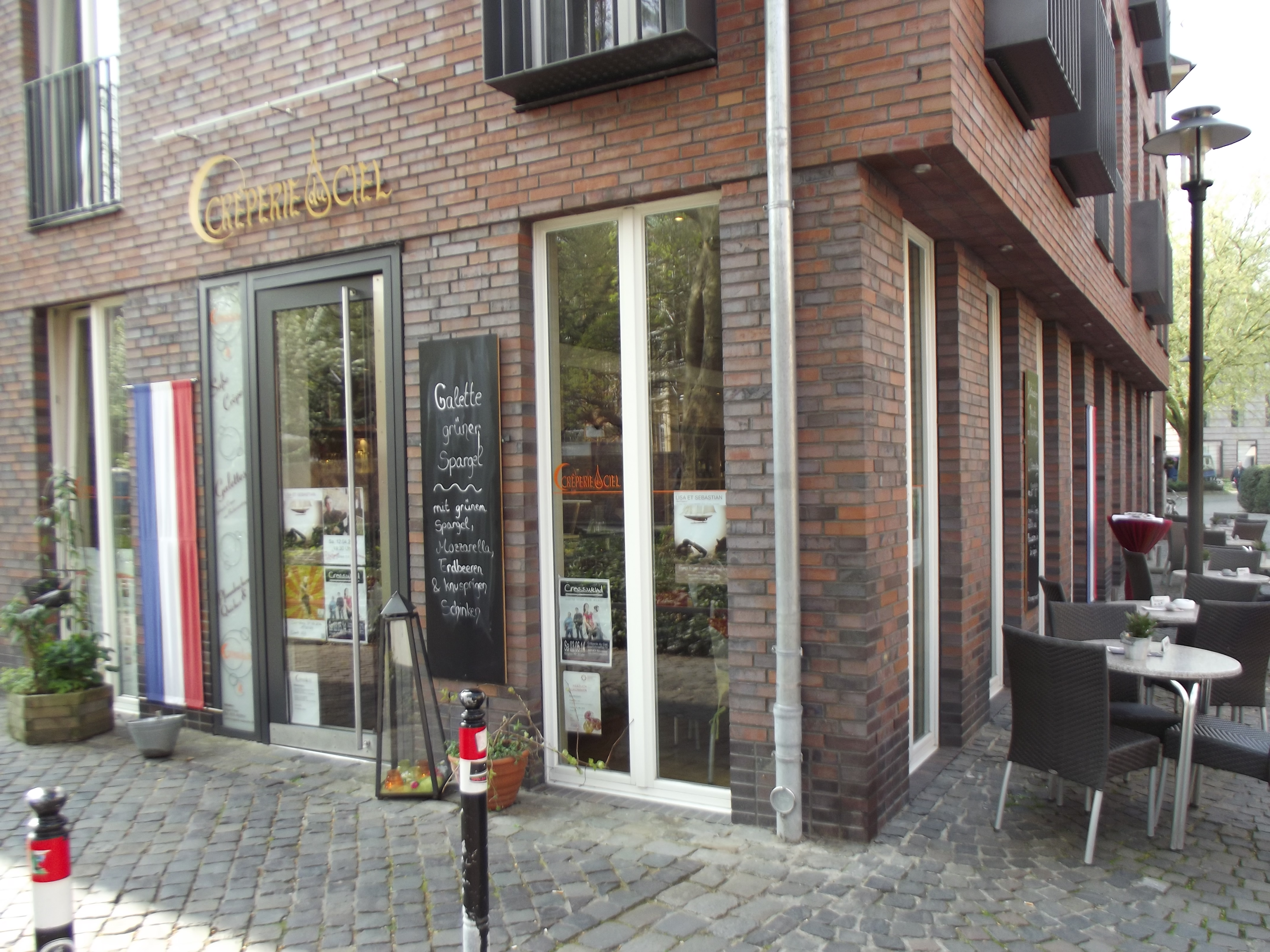
Crêperie in Münster, Germany

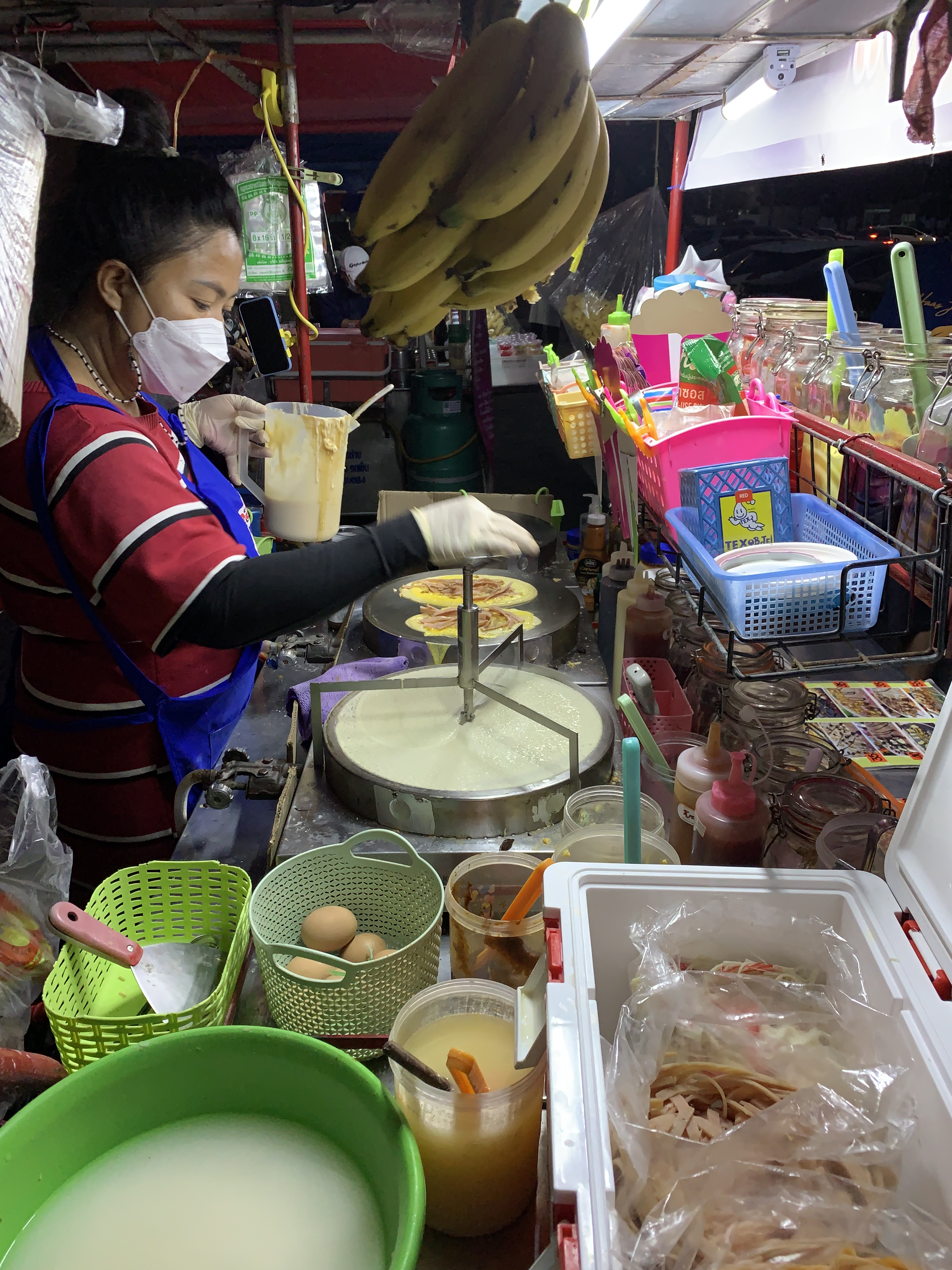
A street crêperie stall in Pak Kret, Thailand

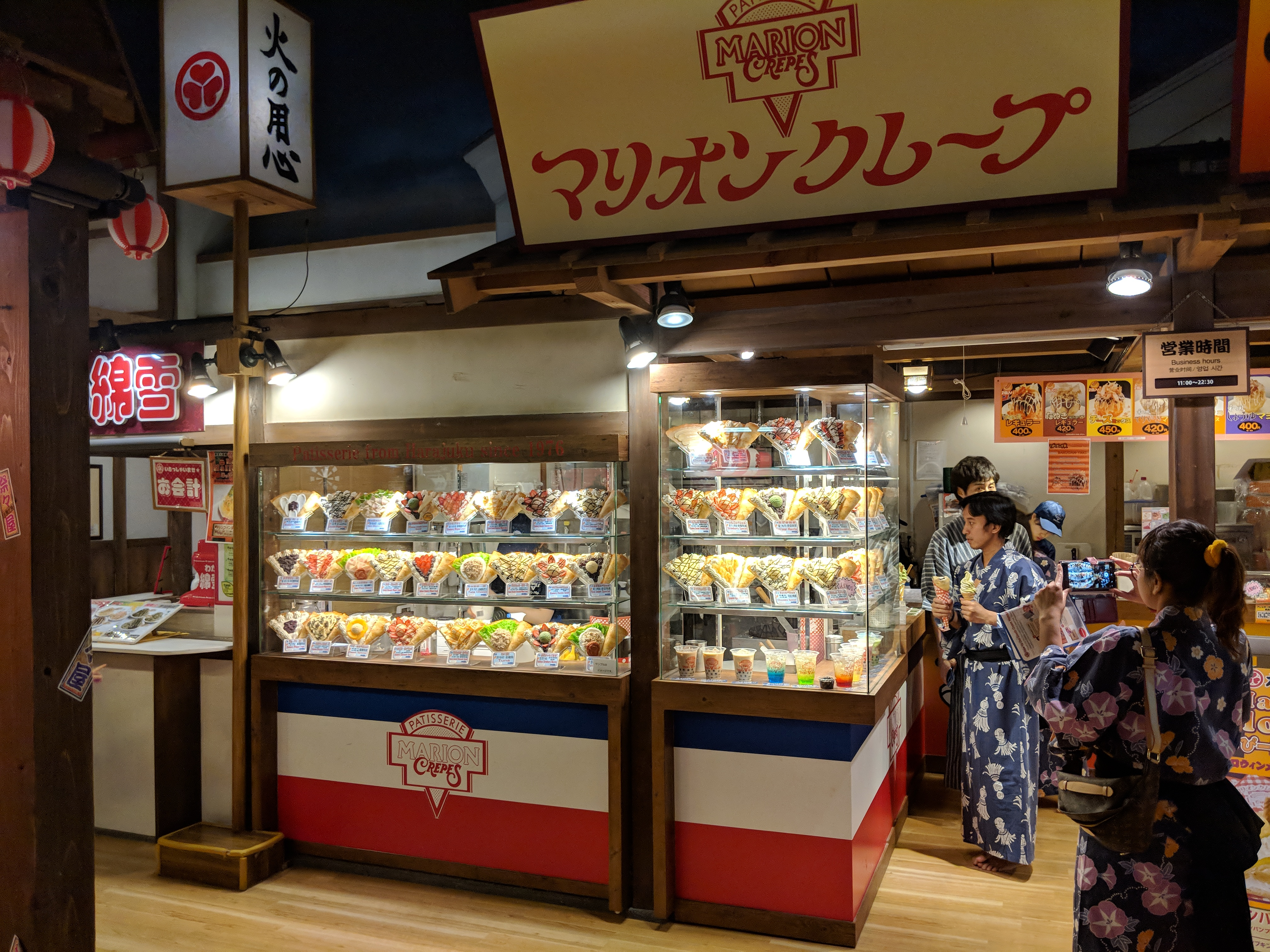
A Marion Crepes store in Tokyo, Japan

== Special crêpes ==
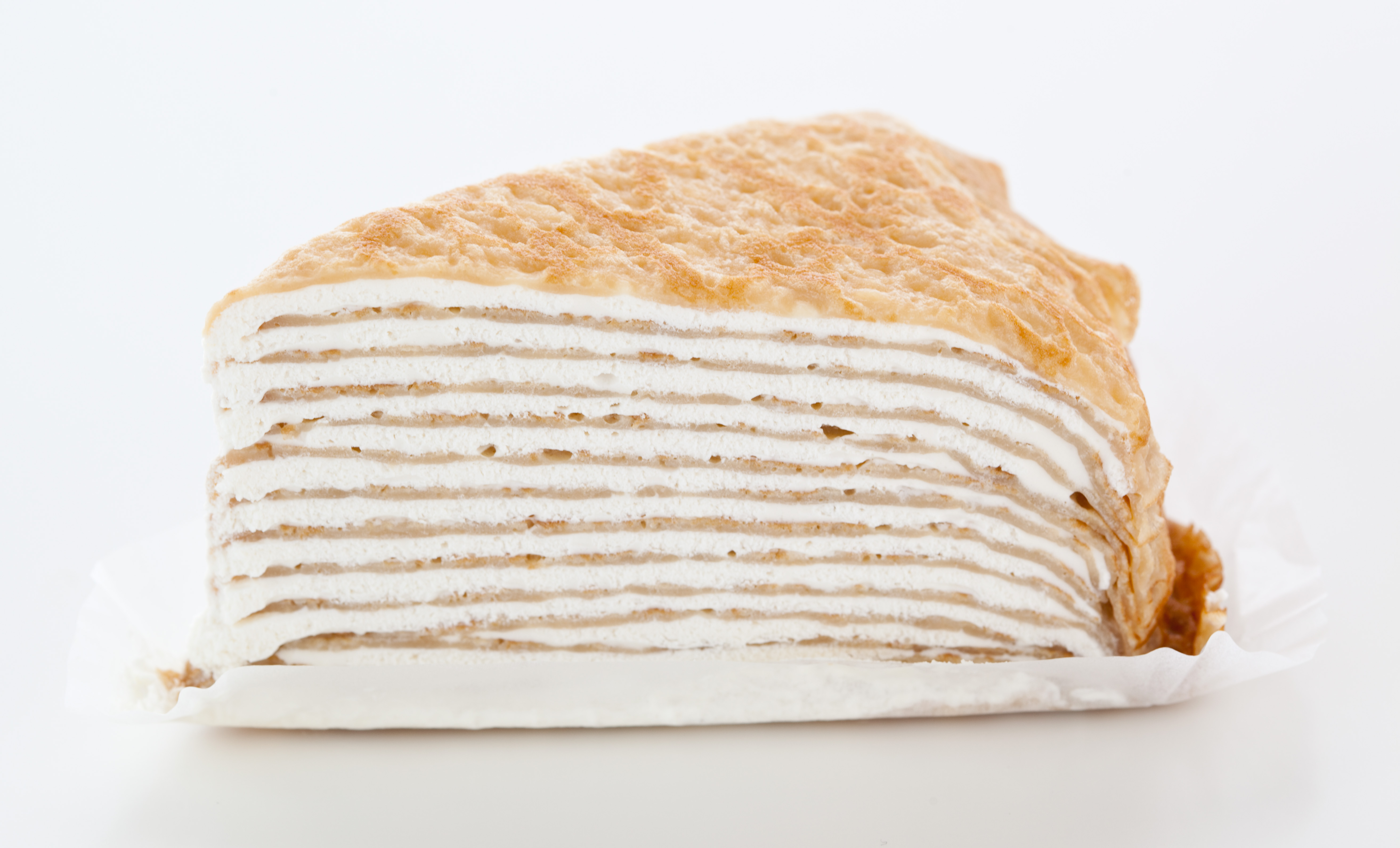
Mille crêpes

Crepe cakes, known in French as mille crêpes, are a French cake made of many crêpe layers. The word mille means "a thousand," implying the many layers of crêpe. Another standard French and Belgian crêpe is the crêpe Suzette, a crêpe with lightly grated orange peel and liqueur (usually Grand Marnier), which is lit during presentation.

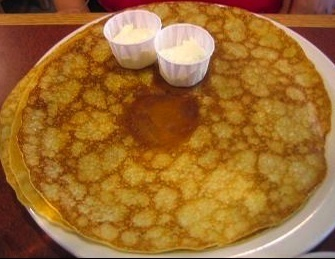
A plate of 49er flapjacks

The 49er flapjack is a sourdough crêpe which is popular in the United States, getting its name from the popularity of this style of pancake during the California Gold Rush. Because it is similar to a Swedish pancake, the 49er is sometimes served with lingonberry sauce, although most often, it is rolled up with butter and powdered sugar or served open-faced and topped with maple syrup.

Crêpe dentelle is a crispy biscuit made with a very thin layer of crêpe folded in a cigar shape and then baked. It is usually consumed with a hot drink during the goûter, in France.

== Crêpes in European culture ==
In Italy, crêpes are called crespelle, and in most Regions of Italy crespelle are referring to a wide and flat crêpe, as opposed to the smaller pancakes. In Swedish, a crêpe is called pannkaka in southern regions while being called plättar in the north. In Danish it is called pandekager ("pancakes"). In Icelandic it is called pönnukaka. In Finnish a crêpe is called either ohukainen or lettu or lätty or räiskäle. In Greek it is called krepa (Κρέπα). In Dutch it is a pannenkoek or flensje. In Afrikaans crêpes are called pannekoek, and are usually served with cinnamon and sugar. In the Spanish regions of Galicia and Asturias, they are traditionally served at carnivals. In Galicia, they're called filloas and may also be made with pork blood instead of milk. In Asturias, they are called fayueles or frixuelos.

In areas of central Europe, formerly belonging to the Austro-Hungarian empire, there is a thin pancake comparable to a crêpe that in Romanian is called clătită, in Austro-Bavarian it is Palatschinken; in Hungarian: palacsinta; and in Bosnian, Bulgarian, Macedonian, Czech, Croatian, Serbian and Slovene: palačinka; in Slovak: palacinka. In the Balkan countries, palačinka or pallaçinka may be eaten with fruit jam, quark cheese, sugar, honey, or the hazelnut-chocolate cream Nutella, while there is also a breaded variant which is mostly filled with meat. Restaurants specialising in palačinci are called "Palačinkara" in the region. In Ashkenazi Jewish cuisine, there is a similar dish known as the blintz. The Oxford English Dictionary derives the German and Slavic words from the Hungarians palacsinta, which it derives from the Romanian plăcintă, which comes in turn from classical Latin placenta ("small flat cake"), even though the Romanian plăcintă is more similar to a pie, and the crêpes are called clătite.

In Russian culture, blini are eaten during Maslenitsa (Cheesefare Week), which has a history dating to the early Middle Ages. Since they are made from butter, eggs, and milk, crêpes can be consumed during the celebration by the Eastern Orthodox Church. White flour can be replaced with buckwheat flour, milk can be switched for kefir, and oils can be added or substituted. Blini are served with butter and topped with caviar, cheese, meat, potatoes, mushrooms, honey, berry jam, or often a dollop of sour cream. The dish is supposed to represent the sun since the holiday is about the beginning of spring.

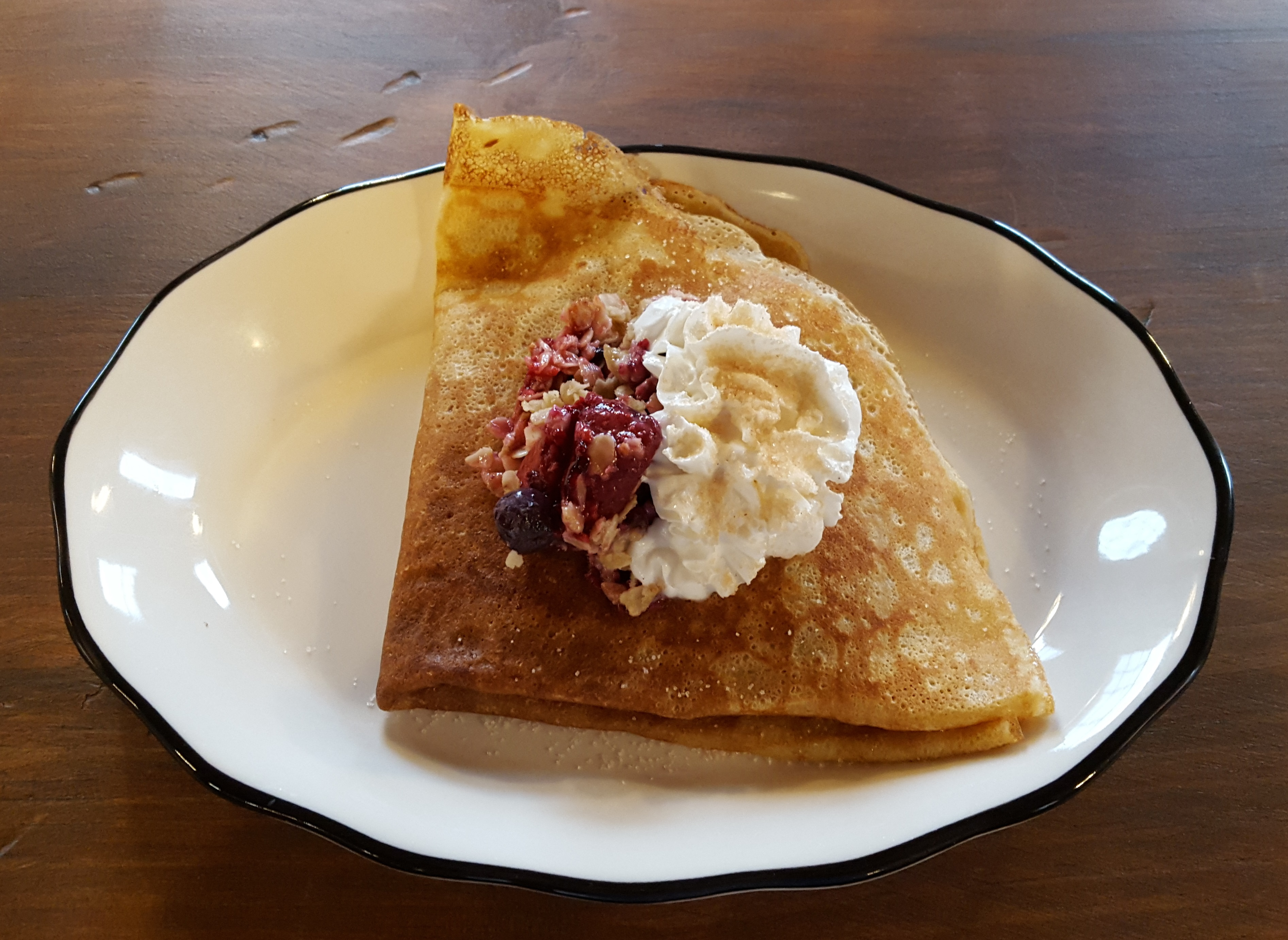
A sweet crêpe filled with oats and berries and topped with whipped cream

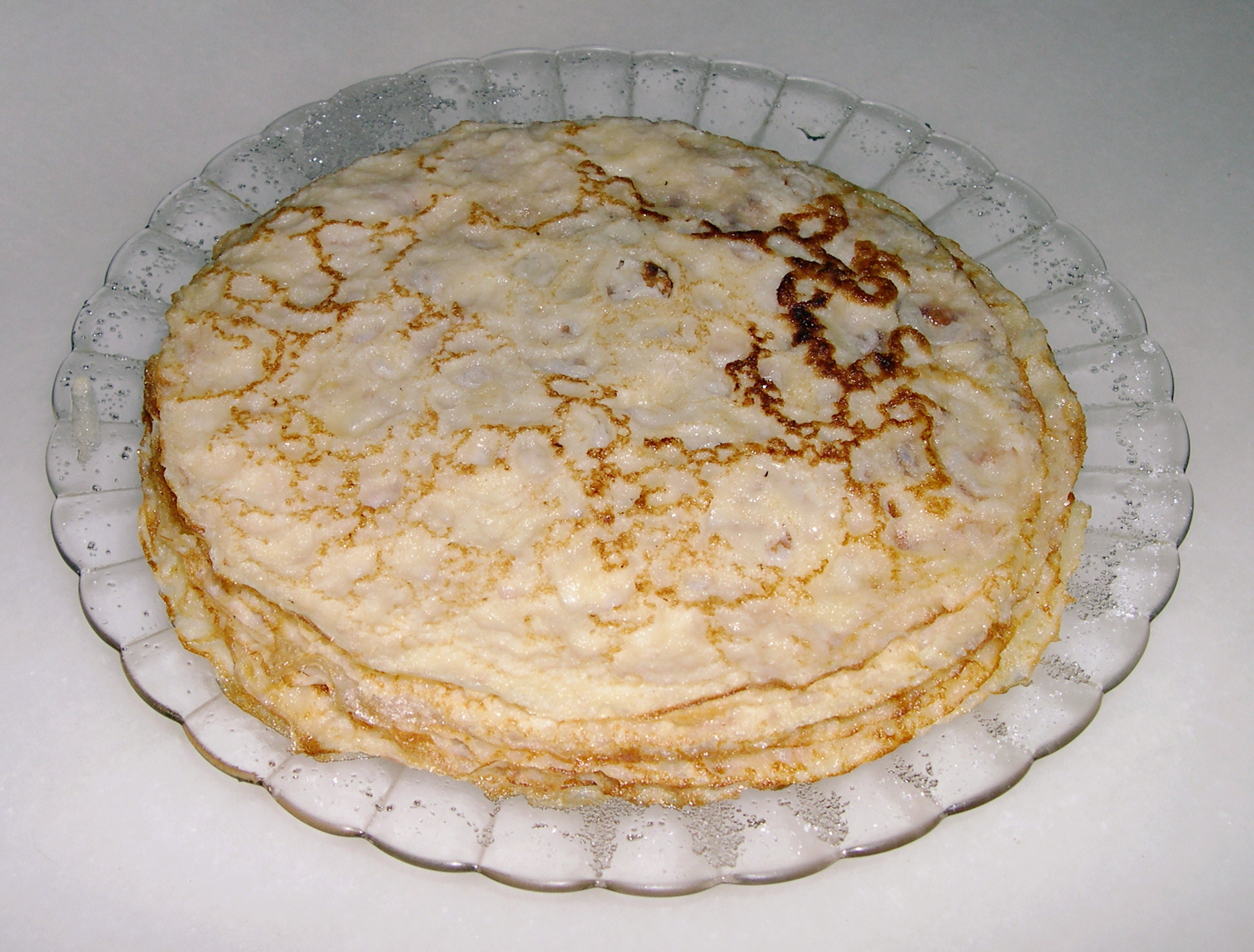
Frixuelos. This is a kind of crêpe made in Asturias, Spain.

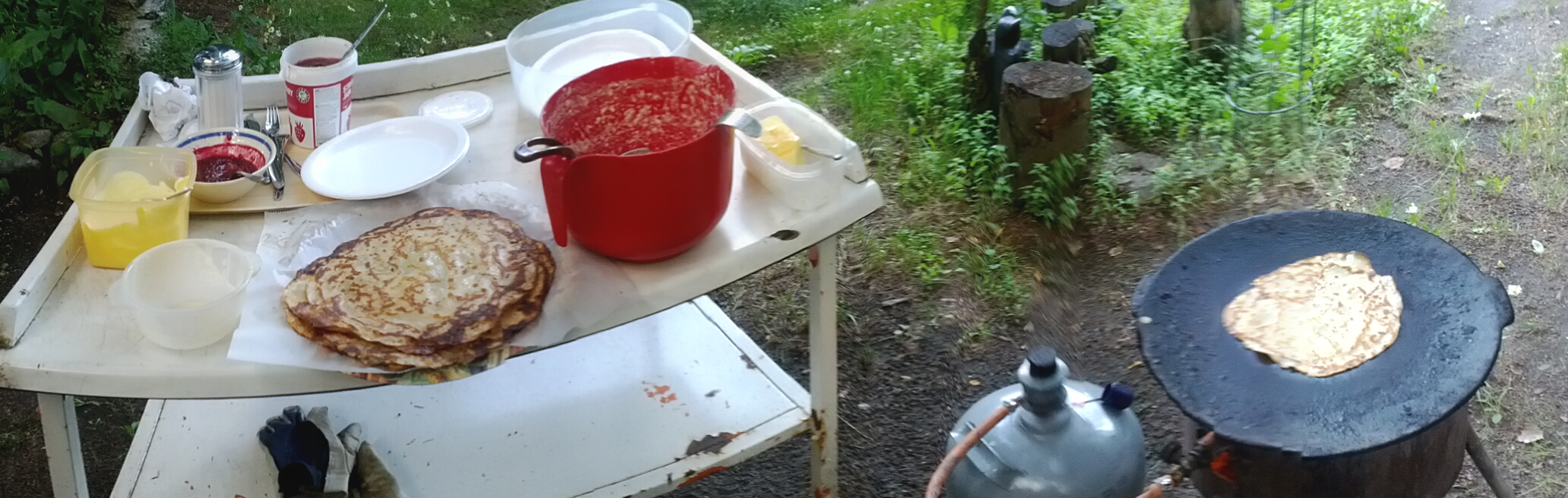
Making Finnish crêpes called ohukainen

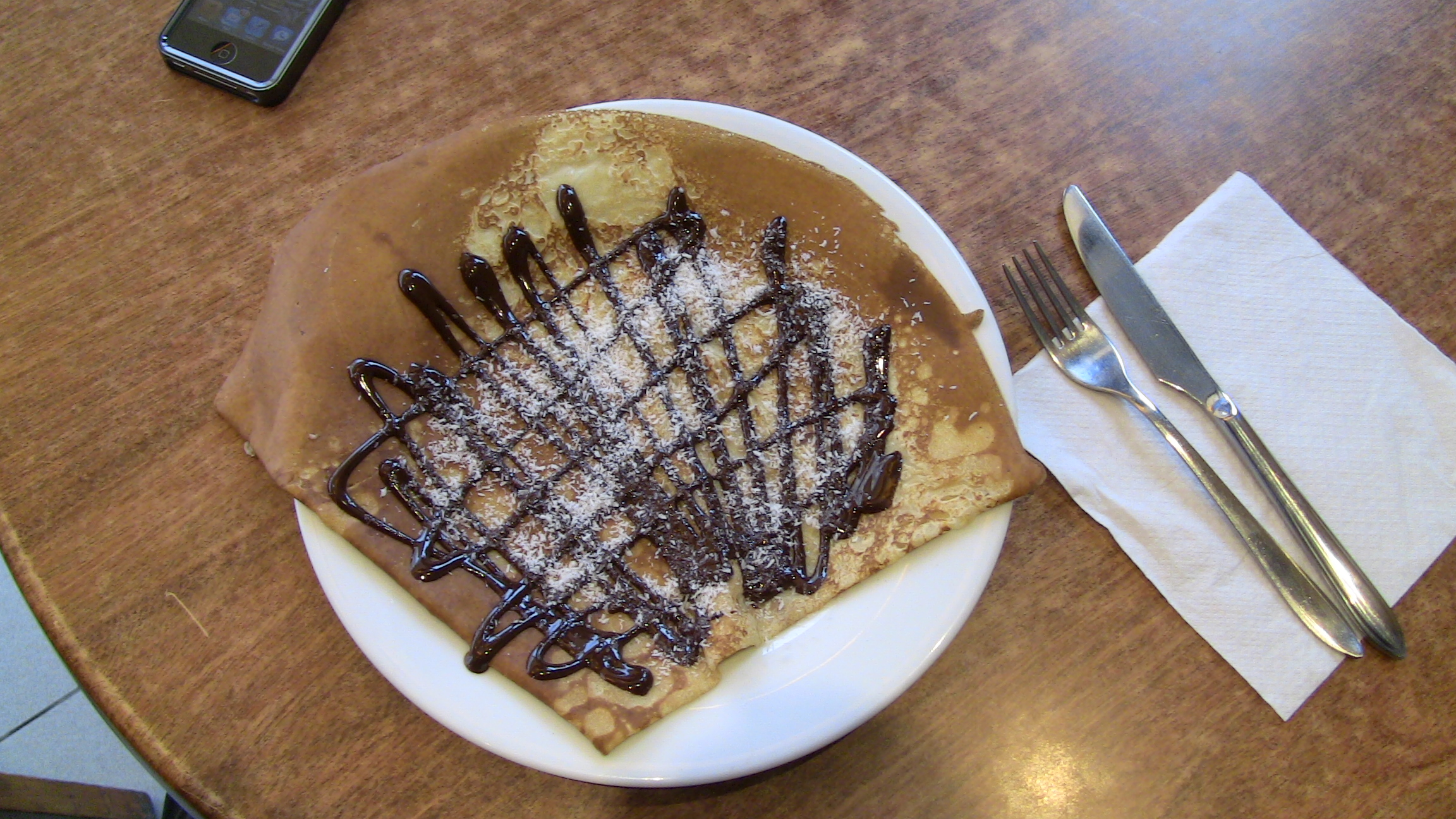
Chocolate-Coconut Crêpe served in crêperie near the Pantheon in Paris, France

== Crêpes outside of Europe ==
Crêpes have also long been popular in Japan and Malaysia, with sweet and savoury varieties being sold at many small stands, usually called crêperies. In Argentina, Uruguay, and Chile, they are called panqueques and are often eaten with dulce de leche. Various other French foods such as crêpes, soufflés, and quiche have slowly made their way into American cooking establishments. Typically, these franchises stick to the traditional French method of making crêpes, but they have also put their own spin on the crêpe with new types, such as the hamburger and pizza crêpe. In Canada, particularly in French-speaking regions, crêpes and galettes have long been traditional food items.

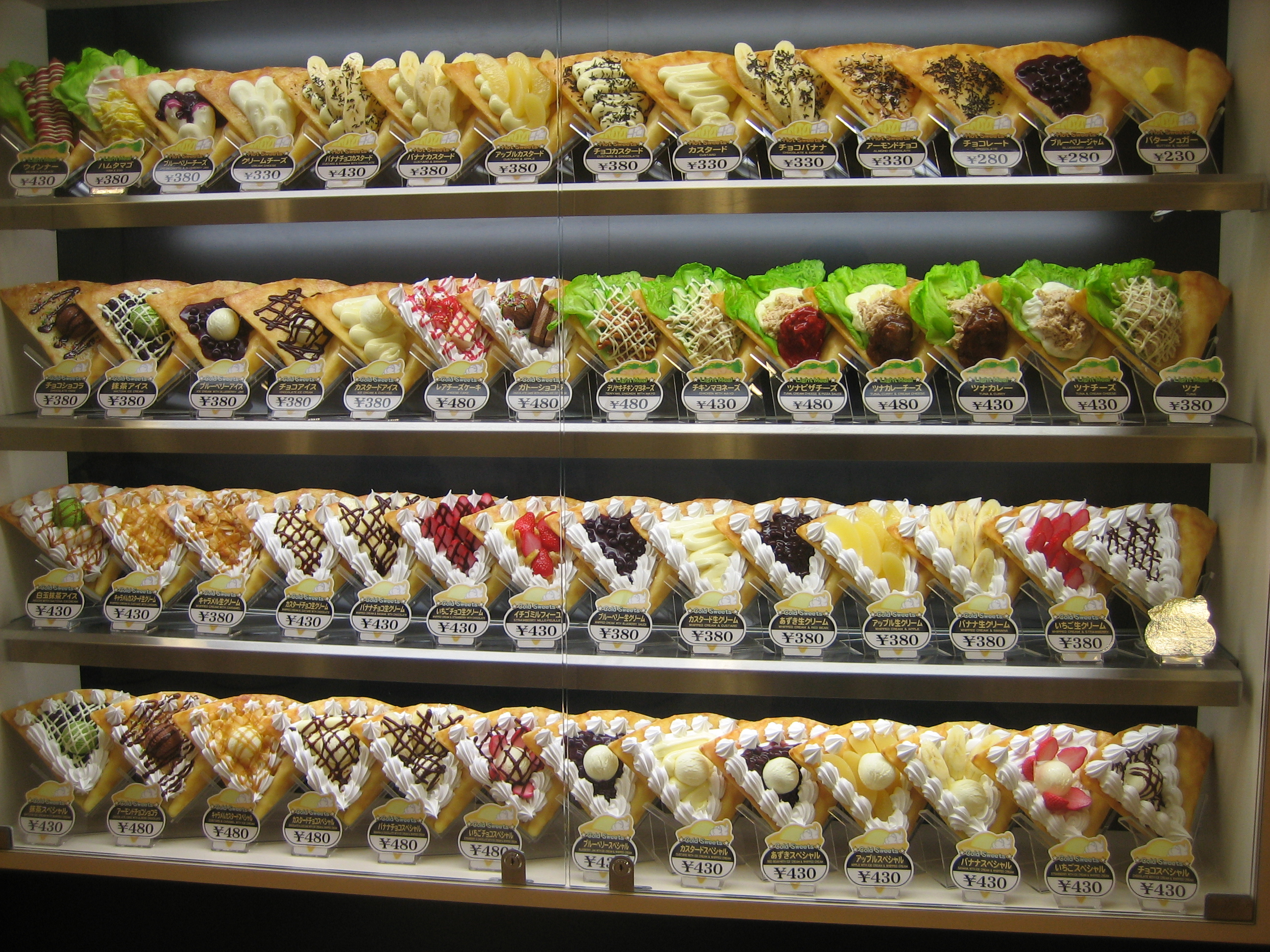
Harajuku Crêpes

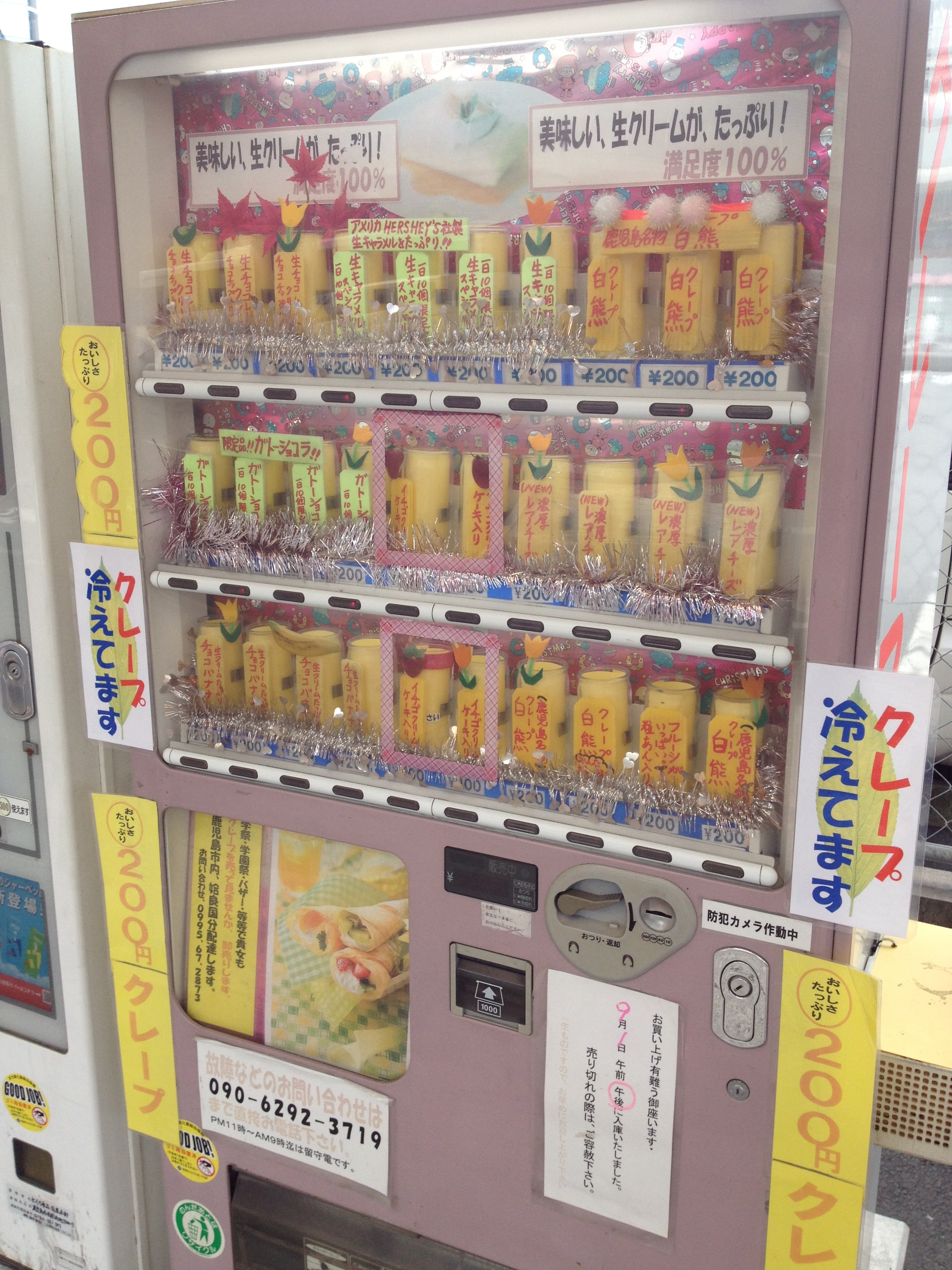
Crepe vending machine in Kagoshima

The Japanese crêpes developed into something different from the French crêpes due to their various fillings and toppings, and the style later spread outside of Japan. It is often called 'Harajuku Crêpes'. In Japan, French crêpes were introduced in the 1970s, and they were only spread with jam and were not very popular. In 1977, Mizuki Ono opened a crêpe shop in Harajuku and, taking inspiration from ice cream monaka, began to sell crêpes with ice cream, whipped cream, and sliced fruit, which became very popular. They were rarely made at home and spread as sweets purchased from street stalls and eaten on the street.

In Mexico, crêpes are known as crepas and were introduced during the 19th century by the French and are typically served either as a sweet dessert when filled with cajeta (similar to dulce de leche), or as a savoury dish when filled with Huitlacoche (corn smut), which is considered a delicacy.

== Similar dishes in other cuisines ==
In Southern India, a similar dish made of fermented rice batter is called a dosa, which often has savoury fillings. In Western India, a dish made of gram flour is called "Pudlaa" or "Poodla," with the batter consisting of vegetables and spices. Another variety is called "patibola" and is sweet in taste due to milk, jaggery, or sugar. The injera of Ethiopian/Eritrean/Somali/Yemeni cuisine is often described as a thick crêpe. In Somalia, malawah is very similar to a crêpe. It is mostly eaten at breakfast.

In China, Jianbing is a traditional Chinese street food similar to crêpes. It is generally eaten for breakfast and hailed as "one of China's most popular street breakfasts." It consists of a wheat and grain-based crepe, an egg, deep-fried crackers (known as Bao Cui/薄脆 in Chinese), chopped scallions, coriander, and typically a mixture of chilli and soybean paste.

In Indonesia, Kue leker is a type of Indonesian crêpe. Also, ledre, a rolled banana crêpe from Bojonegoro.

In the Philippines, a native crêpe recipe is the daral which is made from ground glutinous rice and coconut milk batter (galapong). It is rolled into a cylinder and filled with sweetened coconut meat strips (hinti).

In Taiwan, Danbing is a traditional Taiwanese breakfast similar to crêpes. The dough is made by kneading cornstarch and sweet potato flour with water into a thin dough, and an omelet is baked on top of the dough. In Taiwan, dan bing is mainly sold at breakfast shops, restaurants as well as night market food stalls. They are also sold commercially in supermarkets, where the dough is frozen in plastic packaging, and egg is added as the dough is heated.

== See also ==
- List of pancakes
- Bánh xèo
- Blini
- Maslenitsa – a related Eastern Slavic festival
- Blintz
- Blodplättar – a form of savoury crepe made with blood
- Brik
- Crêpe maker – crepe cooking device
- Dosa
- Galette – another kind of Breton pancake, also from Brittany, France
- Injera
- Jianbing – a traditional Chinese street food similar to a crepe
- Kue leker – a traditional Indonesian crepe
- Krampouz – crepe maker manufacturer, also from Brittany, France
- Memil-buchimgae
- Palatschinke
- Pek nga – Malaysian crepe-like snack
- Popiah – Chinese roll wrapped in a thin crepe made by "wiping" dough on a hot plate
- Roti canai
- Sope
- Swedish pancake
- Tava
- Krumkake
- Fazuelos
- Waffle

== Sources ==
19. Life A La Henri – Being The Memories of Henri Charpentier, by Henri Charpentier and Boyden Sparkes, The Modern Library, New York, 2001 Paperback Edition. Originally published in 1934 by Simon & Schuster, Inc.
