= Crêpe maker =

Cooking device

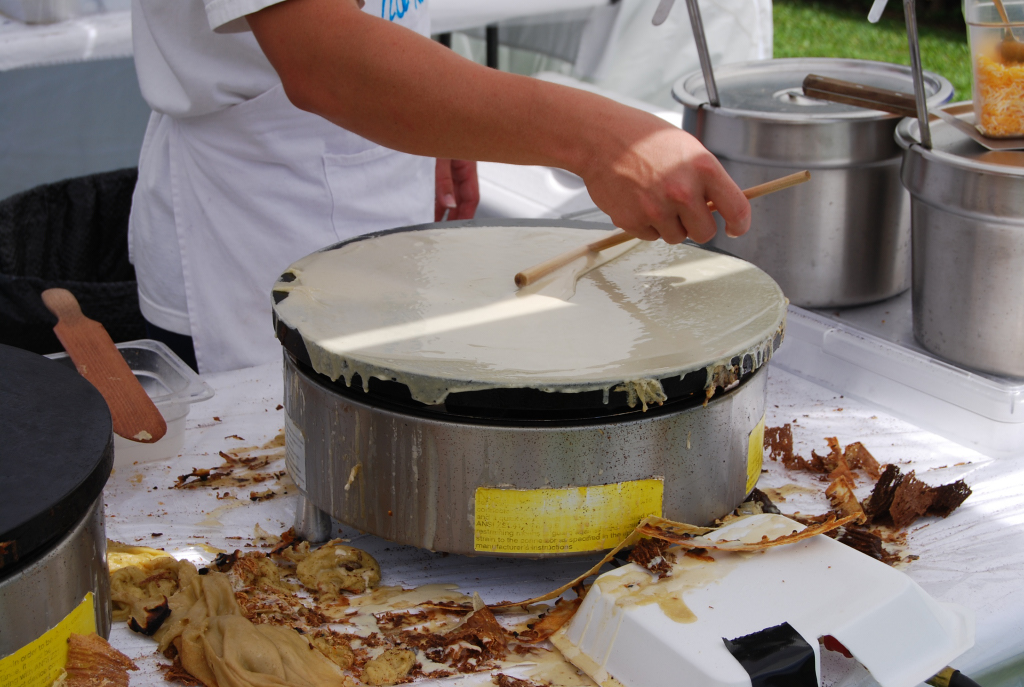
A modern crepe maker in Germany

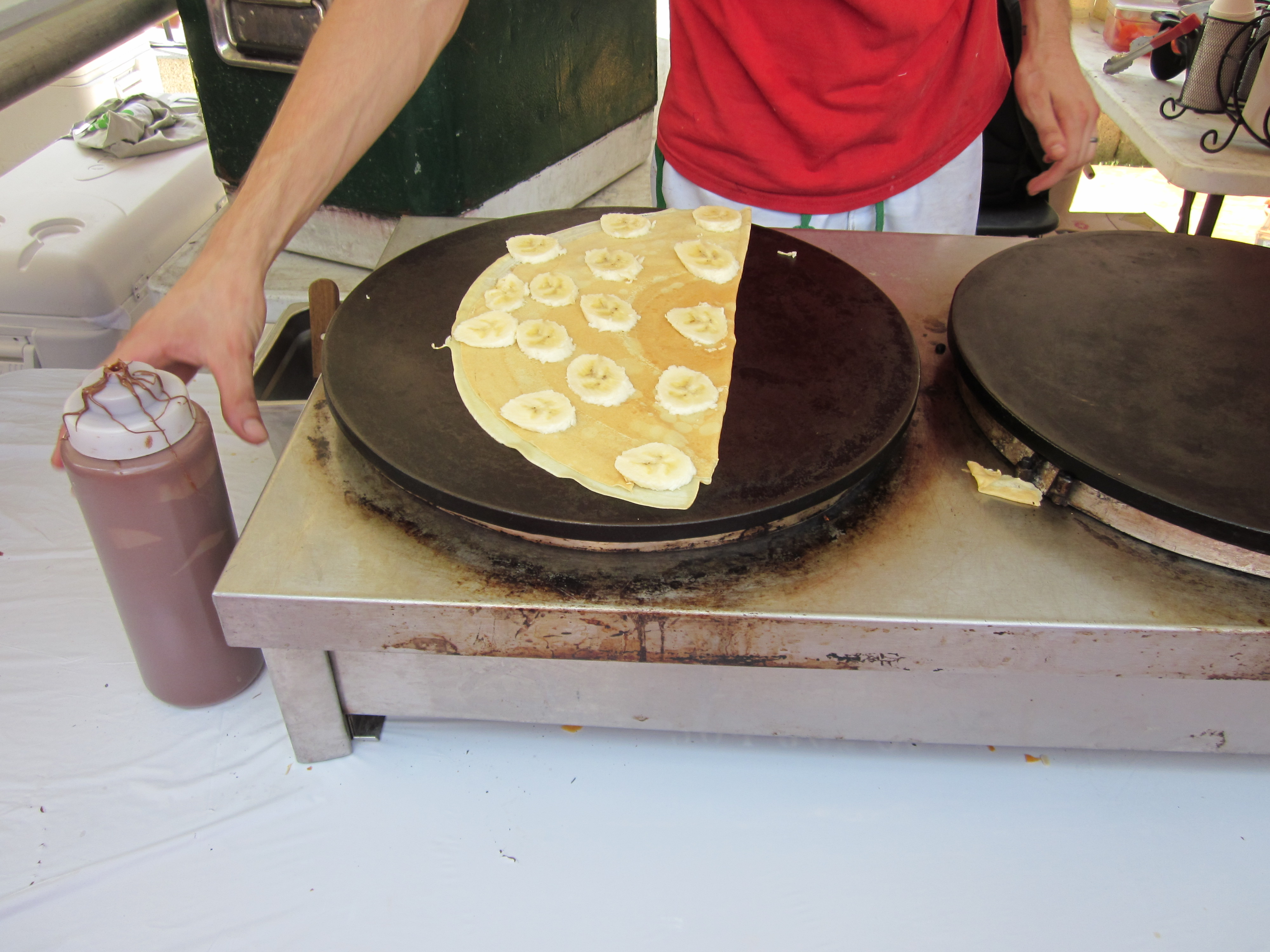
A crepe maker in New Orleans

A crêpe maker is a cooking device used to make crêpes, galettes, pancakes, blinis or tortillas. It should not be mistaken for a regular pan or a crêpe pan.

== Origins ==
Crêpe makers were originally large cast-iron plates set over the fire to cook cereal-based batters. The machines have since evolved and the cast-iron plates were set on top of stainless steel frames. These first machines were electric machines, and later on, gas crêpe griddles were developed as well. Although professional cast-iron crêpe makers usually need to be seasoned, non-stick cast-iron griddles and mini-crêpe makers can now be commonly found on the market.

== Denomination ==
Crêpe cooking machines are commonly referred to as crêpe makers or crêpe griddles.

They are also known as billig, mainly in Brittany, France, where crêpes originated. Billig is a mutated form of the breton word pillig meaning "crêpe maker".

== See also ==
- Krampouz, crêpe maker manufacturer
- Tava
