= Pek nga =

Traditional Malaysian pancake

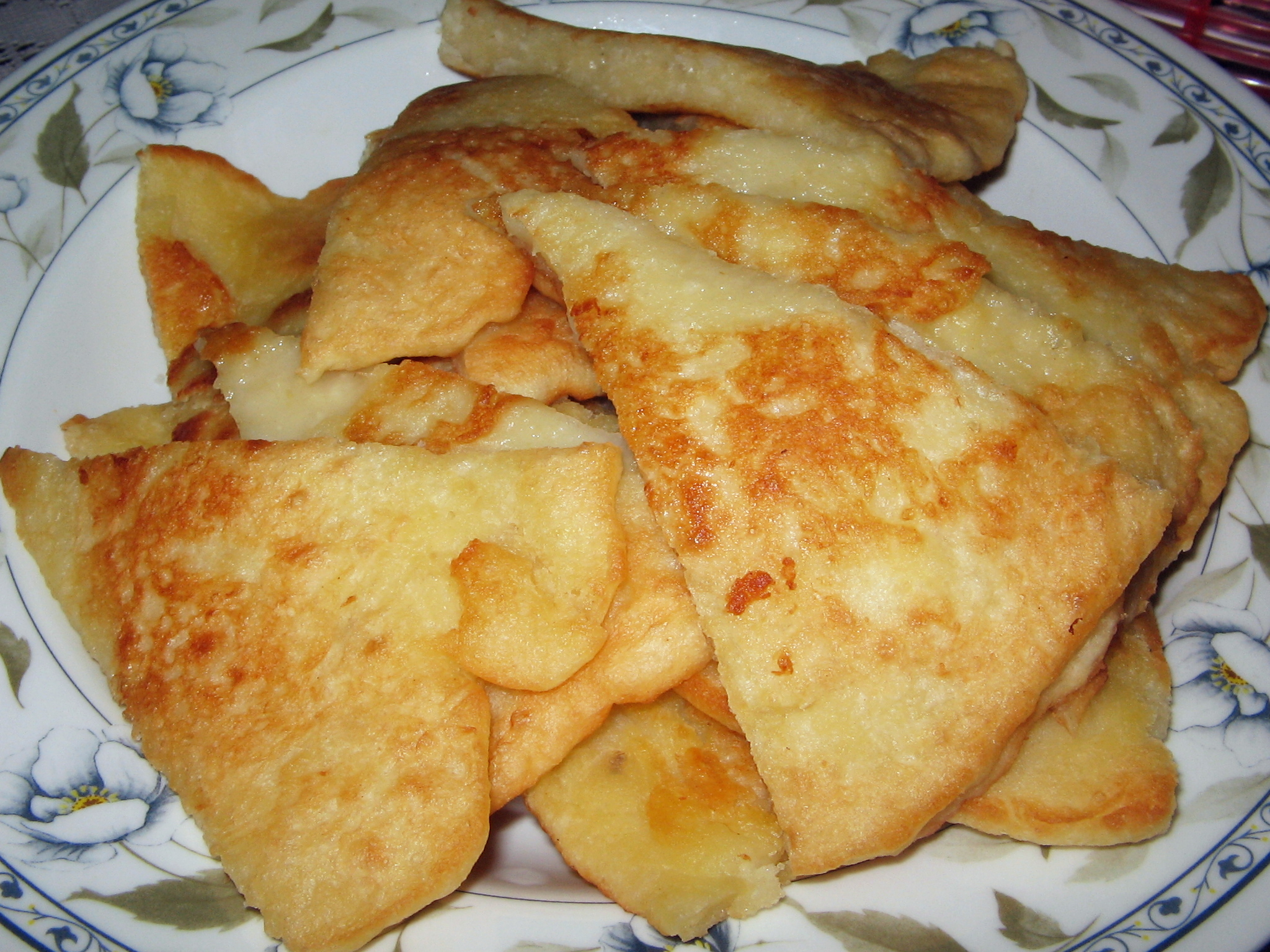
- Homemade pek nga that has been cut.
- Alternative names: Lempeng kelapa, lempeng nyiur
- Type: Pancake
- Course: Breakfast
- Place of origin: Malaysia
- Region or state: Kedah, Kelantan and Terengganu
- Created by: Malaysian Malays
- Main ingredients: Wheat flour, eggs, salt, butter, coconut contents

Pek nga is a traditional Malaysian pancake popular in the northern state of Kedah. It is also known as lempeng kelapa in Kelantan and Terengganu. Pek nga may be eaten with fish gulai, coconut sticky rice, or dried fish. It is usually served during breakfast.

== See also ==
- Cuisine of Malaysia
- Crêpe
