= Kue leker =

Indonesian crêpes

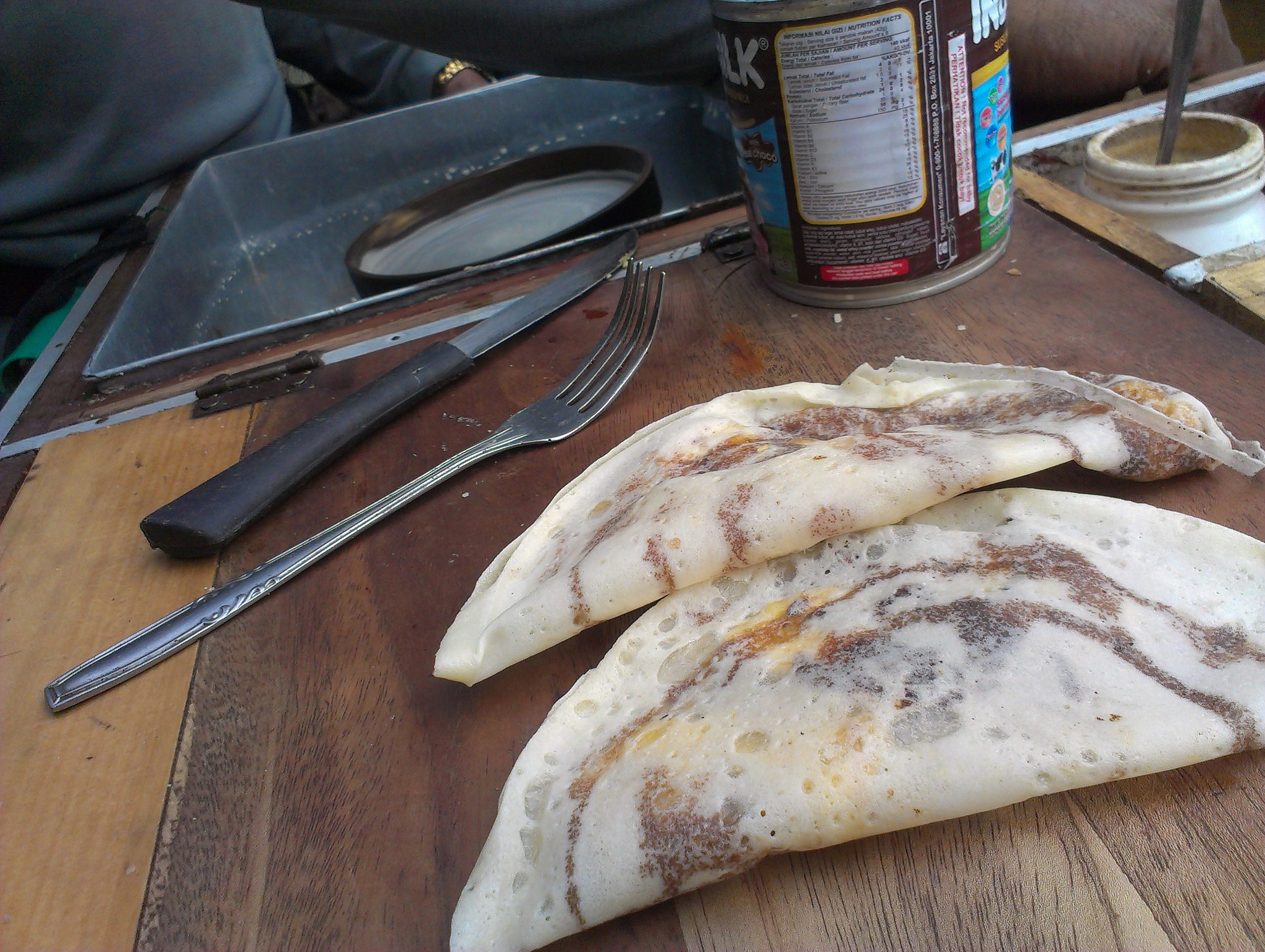
- Two kue lekers being served
- Alternative names: Lekker
- Type: Pancake
- Place of origin: Indonesia
- Region or state: Surakarta, Central Java, Indonesia
- Serving temperature: Warm or room temperature
- Main ingredients: Wheat flour, milk, eggs, sugar

Kue leker is a type of crêpe from Indonesia, made with wheat flour, eggs, milk and sugar.

== Ingredients and cooking method ==
Kue leker is commonly served with a variety of fillings and toppings, such as bananas, sugar, condensed milk, cheese, and chocolate sprinkles. Kue leker is typically folded in half prior to serving. Kue leker has a thin and crispy texture, similar to that of a crêpe.

== Origin ==
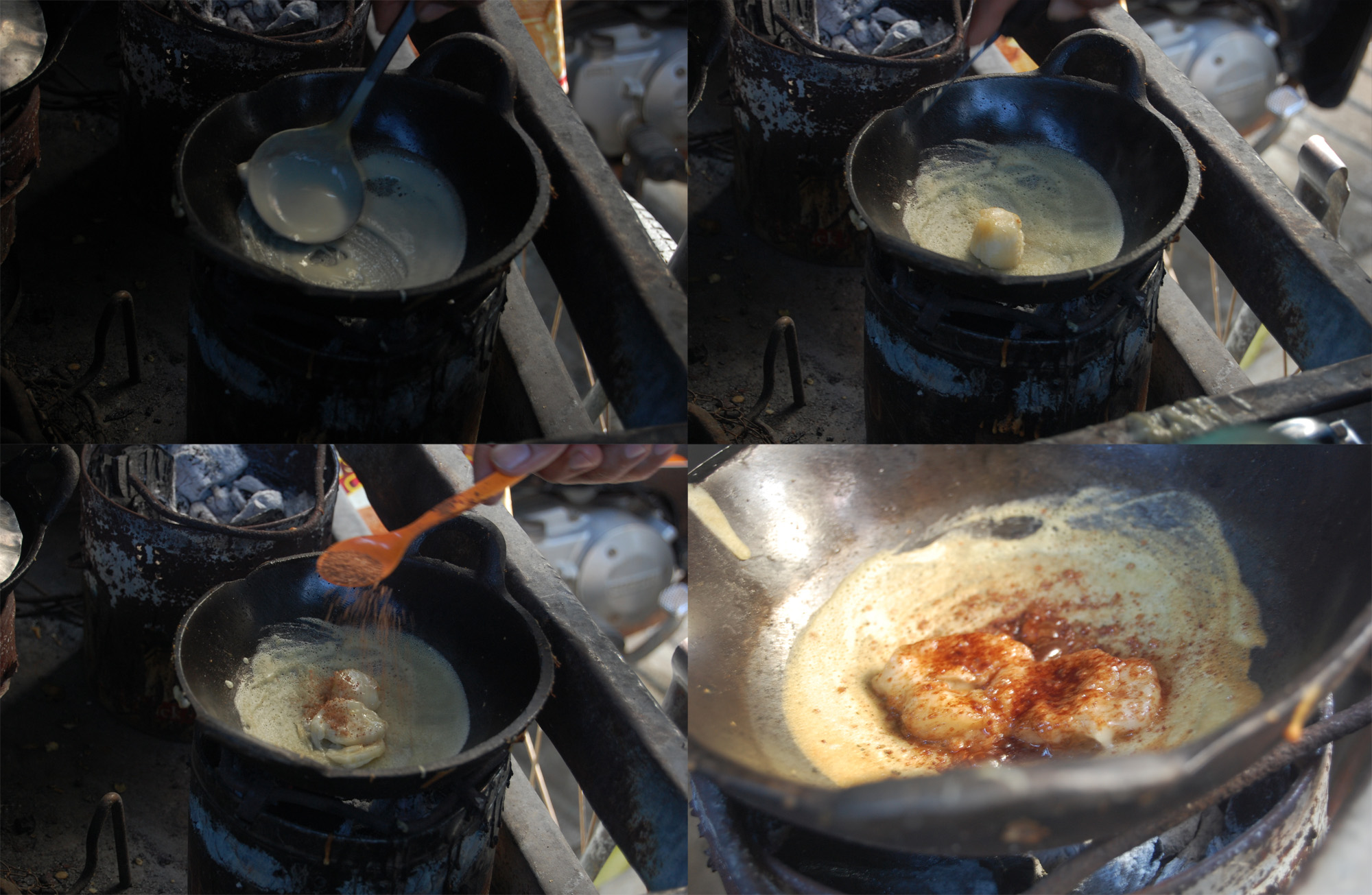
Kue leker being prepared

The name "Leker" comes from the Dutch word Lekker, meaning "tasty". It is believed that kue leker originated from Solo (Surakarta) during the Dutch colonial period.

== See also ==
- Kue ape
- Kue cucur
- Kue
- Serabi
- Terang bulan
