= Lady M (boutique) =

American cake and confectionery boutique chain

- Company type: Private
- Industry: Confectionery
- Genre: Bakery
- Founded: 2001; 25 years ago in New York City
- Founder: Emi Wada
- Key people: Ken Romaniszyn (CEO)
- Products: Cakes and confections
- Website: www.ladym.com

Lady M is a luxury confections brand established in 2001, most famous for its signature Mille Crêpes Cakes. It operates over 50 boutiques worldwide.

== History ==
One of Lady M's founders, Emi Wada, invented the mille crêpes cake and sold them in her Paper Moon Cake Boutiques in Japan starting in 1985. The mille crêpe cakes she created consist of 20 thin handmade crêpes layered with light pastry cream and topped with a caramelized crust.

In 2001, Wada helped found Lady M as a wholesale business delivering cakes to hotels and restaurants in New York City. By 2004, the Lady M cakes had become so popular that the company decided to open a store in Manhattan's Upper East Side. Kumi Iseki, a restaurateur who owned the Shogun of Japan restaurants in California, was also an early investor in Lady M. Wada later relinquished ownership in Lady M so she could concentrate on business back home in Japan.

Ken Romaniszyn joined the business in 2008 through his mother, Iseki, and became the CEO. He has overseen its introduction and growth of online shipping, its expansion into new markets, and its launch of new product lines.

Following success in Hong Kong and Taiwan, Lady M opened its first boutique in mainland China in Shanghai in 2017 to huge crowds. It expanded rapidly in the country in subsequent years, but in 2022 announced the closure of all Chinese stores.

In 2021, Lady M opened its first champagne bar at its Singapore boutique in the ION Orchard mall.

In January 2026, Lady M announced that it will be closing all its Singapore outlets, ahead of a change which would allow the brand to take a more direct role in the Singapore market.

As of April 2026, Lady M operated boutiques in: Mainland China (4), Hong Kong (10), Macau (2), Taiwan (6), and United States (22).
