= List of choux pastry dishes =

This is a list of choux pastry dishes. Choux pastry, or pâte à choux, is a light pastry dough that contains only butter, water, flour and eggs. The high moisture content of the dough causes it to produce steam when cooked, which puffs the pastry.

== Choux pastry dishes ==
Name	Image	Type	Origin	Description
Beignet		Sweet	France	Deep-fried, often topped with powdered sugar.
Bossche bol or reuzenbol		Sweet	Netherlands	A large Dutch profiterole, filled with whipped cream and coated entirely with chocolate.
Cheese puff		Savory	Caribbean	A choux pastry ball (profiterole) filled with cheese paste.
Chicken puff		Savory	Caribbean	A choux pastry ball (profiterole) filled with chicken paste.
Chouquette		Sweet	France	A small portion of choux pastry sprinkled with pearl sugar and sometimes filled with custard or mousse. A chouquette can also be dipped in chocolate or covered in chocolate chips.
Chouxnut		Sweet	U.S.	A doughnut-shaped choux pastry sometimes filled with custard and topped with icing or glaze.
Churro		Sweet or Savory	Southern Europe	A fried pastry made from extruded choux pastry.
Crab puff		Savory	Caribbean	A choux pastry ball (profiterole) filled with crab paste.
Cream puff		Sweet	U.S.	See Profiterole
Croquembouche		Sweet	France	A French dessert consisting of choux pastry balls piled into a cone and bound with threads of caramel.
Éclair		Sweet	France	An oblong pastry filled with a cream and topped with icing.
Egg puffs and soup pearls		Savory	Central Europe	Pellets to decorate soups and other food items.
French cruller		Sweet	United States	A ring-shaped glazed doughnut made from extruded choux pastry.
Gougère		Savory	France	A baked savory pastry made of choux dough mixed with cheese.
Karpatka		Sweet	Poland	A cake made of one sheet of short pastry on the bottom and one sheet of choux pastry on the top (or two sheets of choux pastry), filled with custard or buttercream. Usually served with fruit or ice cream. The cake derives its name from Carpathian Mountains – the top layer resembles their rough peaks and valleys.
Kok		Sweet	Greece	A cream puff with a chocolate glaze sometimes topped with nuts.
Lady's navel		Sweet	Turkey	Made from balls of choux pastry which are given a dimple, deep-fried and then soaked in syrup.
Moorkop		Sweet	Netherlands	A type of Dutch profiterole.
Nun's puffs		Sweet	France	The choux is pan-fried before baking.
Paris-Brest		Sweet	France	Made of choux pastry and a praline flavored cream, shaped round like a wheel for the bicycle race for which it is named.
Pommes dauphine		Savory	France	Crisp potato puffs made by mixing mashed potatoes with savory choux pastry, forming the mixture into dumpling shapes, and then deep-frying.
Profiterole		Sweet	France	A French dessert choux pastry ball filled with whipped cream, pastry cream, custard, or (particularly in the US) ice cream. Commonly known as a cream puff in the U.S. It is the national food of Gibraltar.
Religieuse		Sweet	France	Made of two choux pastry cases, one larger than the other, filled with crème pâtissière, mostly commonly chocolate or mocha.
St. Honoré cake		Sweet	France	A circle of puff pastry at its base with a ring of choux piped on the outer edge. This base is traditionally filled with crème chiboust and finished with whipped cream using a special St. Honoré piping tip.
Tuna puff		Savory	Caribbean	A choux pastry ball (profiterole) filled with tuna paste.

== See also ==
- List of baked goods
