= Paris–Brest =

French pâtisserie

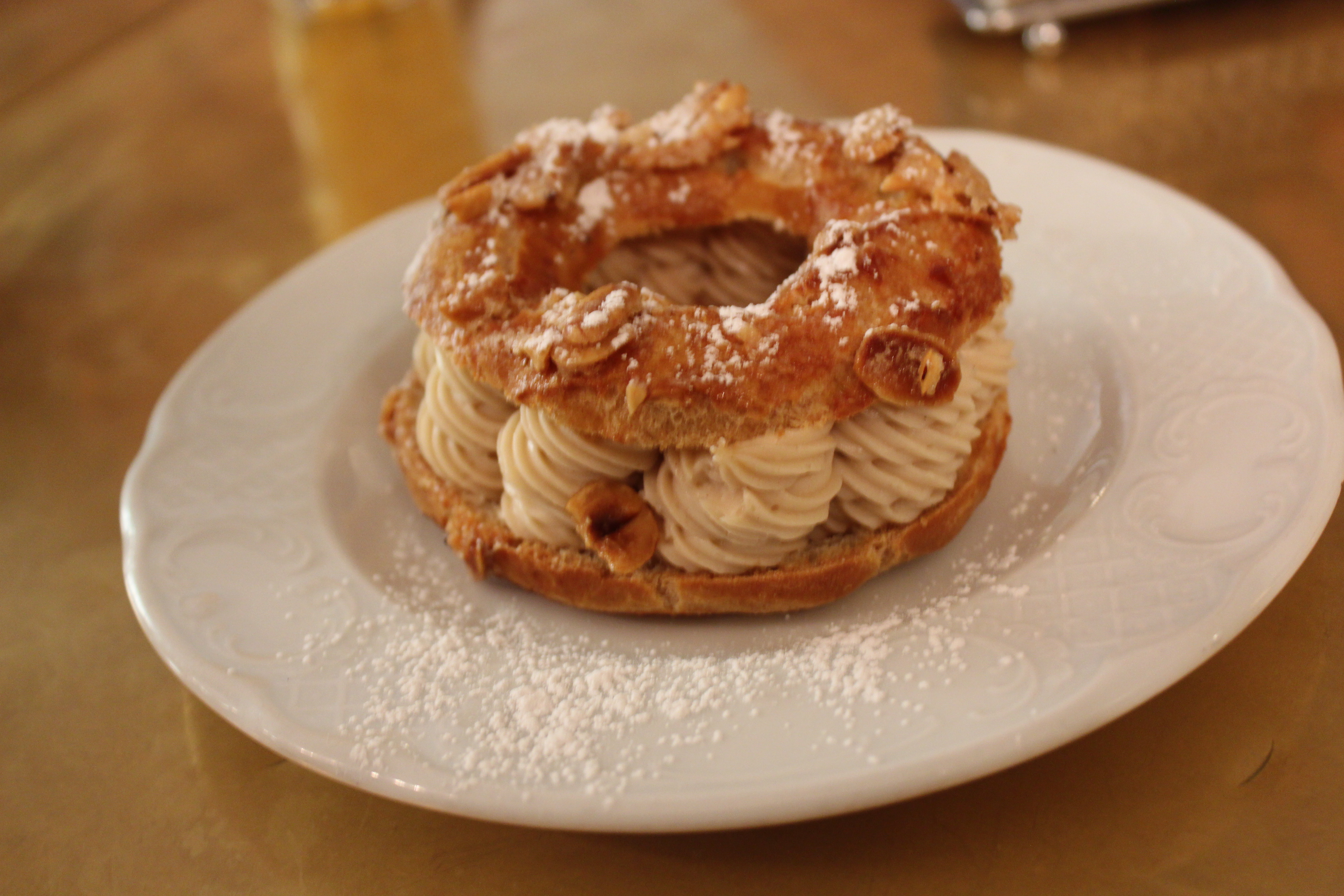
- Paris–Brest
- Type: Pâtisserie
- Course: Dessert
- Place of origin: France
- Main ingredients: Choux pastry, praline cream

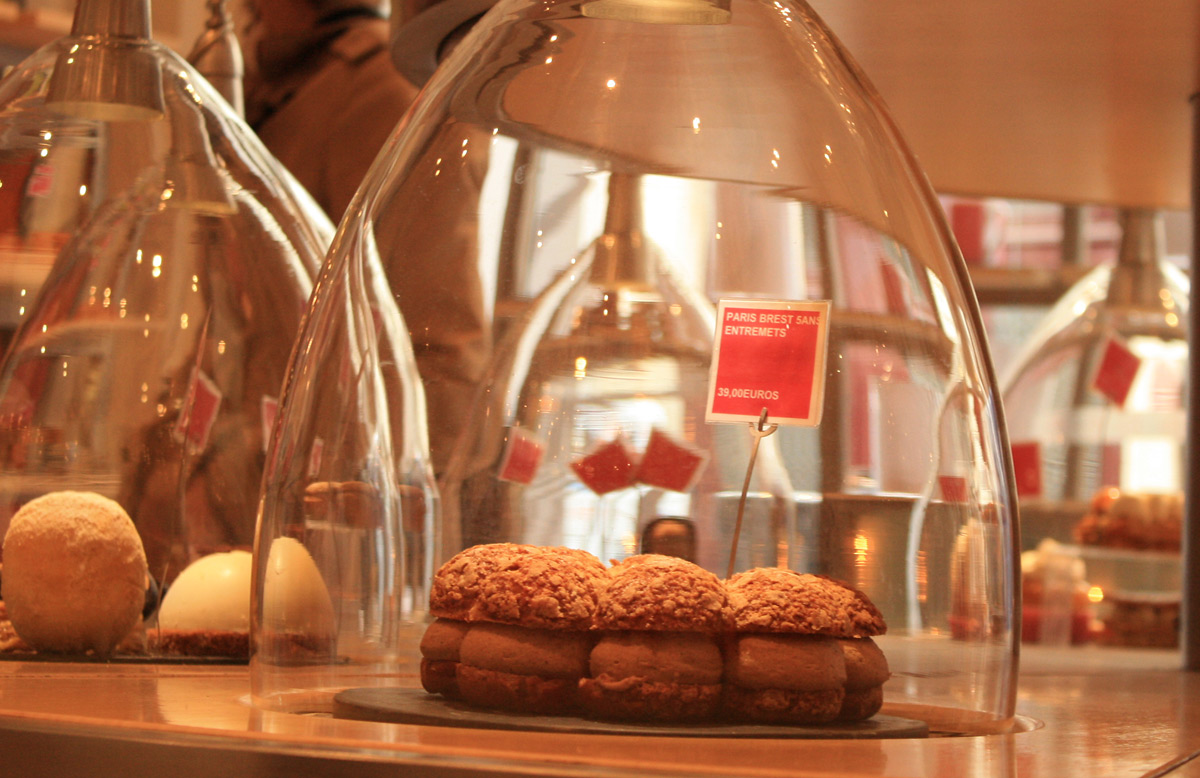
'Paris Brest' pastry variation by Philippe Conticini

The Paris–Brest is a traditional French pâtisserie originally created to commemorate the Paris–Brest–Paris bicycle race. It typically consists of a ring of choux pastry, resembling a bicycle wheel, which is filled with a praline-flavored crème mousseline and covered with flaked almonds. Common variations take the forme of an éclair rather than a ring, or replace the filling with crème chiboust or a buttercream.

== History ==
The pâtisserie has been attributed to several different pâtissiers residing along the race route, notably Maisons-Laffitte pâtissier Louis Durand; others credit a M. Bauget, also of Maisons-Laffitte, a M. Gerbet of Chartres, or an unnamed pastry chef from the Paris suburbs. Durand is said to have created the Paris–Brest in 1909 or 1910, possibly at the request of race founder Pierre Giffard. Some sources describe Durand as creating the pâtisserie initially in the form of an éclair, with another chef from the western suburbs of Paris later giving it its distinctive circular shape. Others claim that Durand created it in a round shape based on an existing pâtisserie in the shape of a laurel wreath, such as that awarded to the winner of the race.

The pâtisserie appeared in 1910 under the name paris-nice in Traité de pâtisserie moderne ('Treatise on Modern Pastry') by Émile Darenne and Émile Duval. In 1930, Louis Durand's son Paul attempted to patent the Paris–Brest, but the pâtisserie was so widespread by that point that the patent was rejected.

In 2012, a TNS Sofres poll found the Paris–Brest to be the 15th most popular dessert in France.

== See also ==
- List of choux pastry dishes
