= Bossche bol =

Chocolate-covered pastry filled with whipped cream

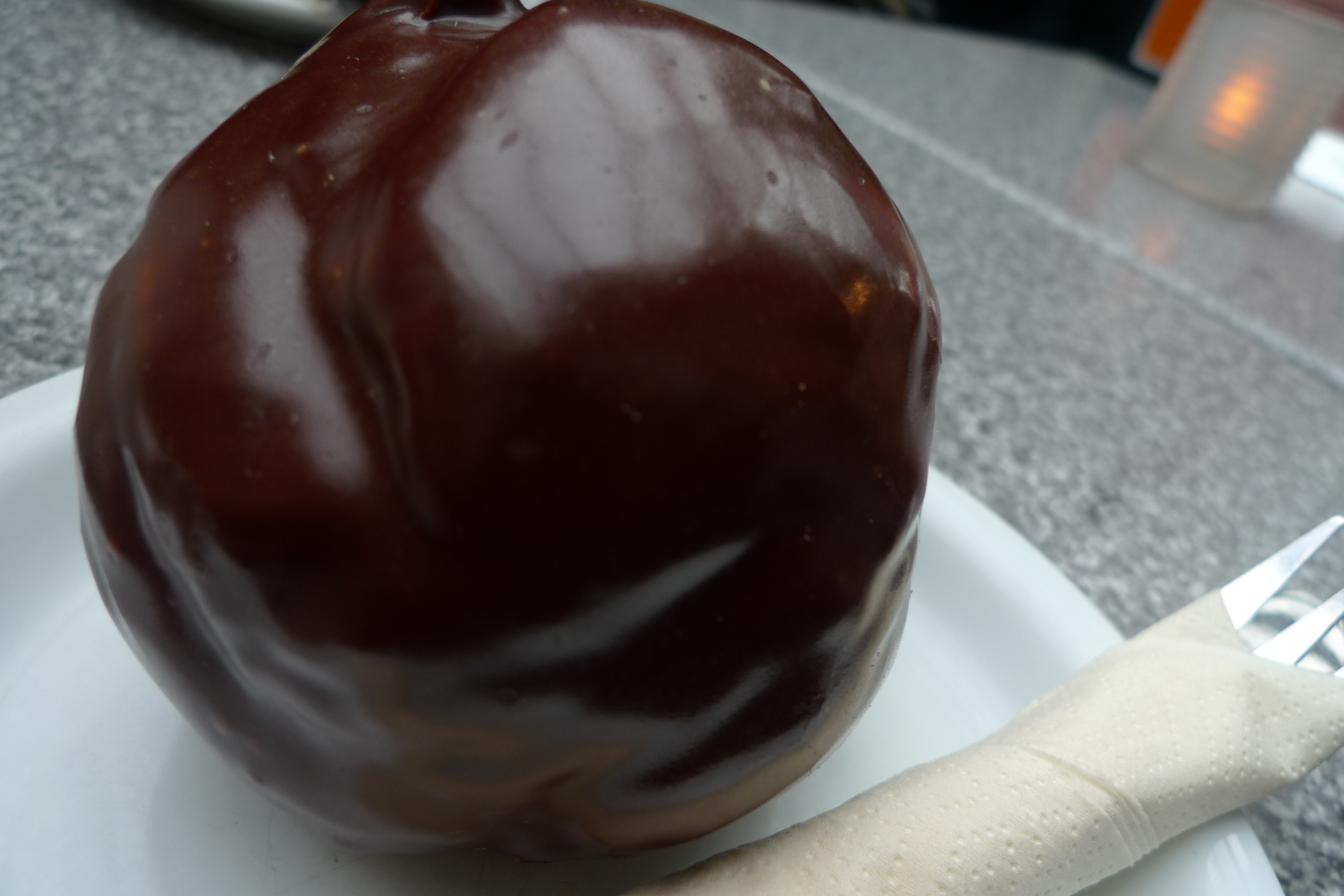
A close-up view of a Bossche bol

A Bossche bol (Dutch pronunciation: [ˌbɔsə ˈbɔl], Dutch for 'Ball from Den Bosch') – or just called chocoladebol ('chocolate ball') in its city of origin – is a pastry from the Dutch city of 's‑Hertogenbosch. It is effectively a large profiterole (cream puff), about 12 cm (5 in.) in diameter, filled with whipped cream and coated entirely or almost entirely with (usually dark) chocolate fondant icing.

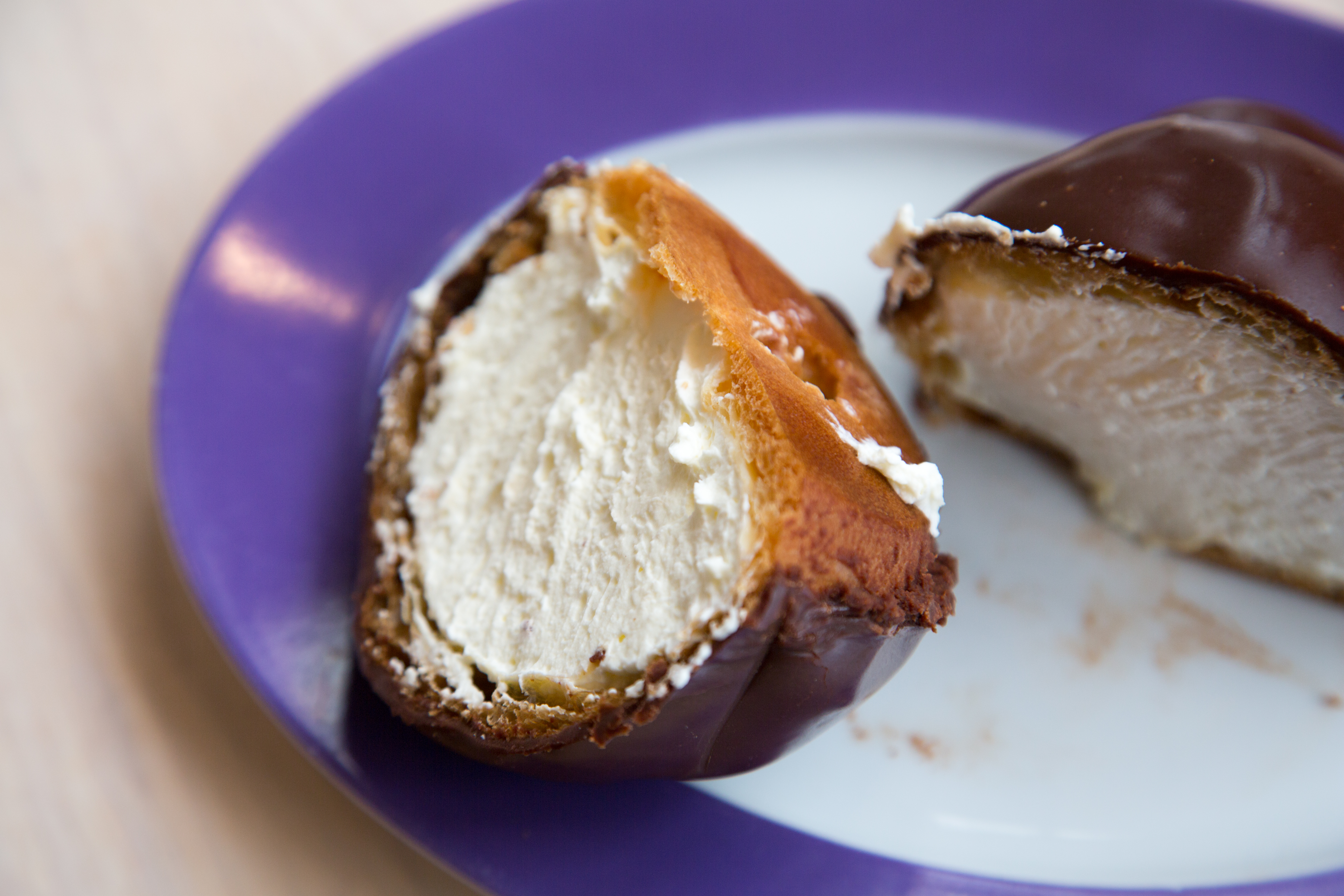
The inside of a Bossche bol

== History ==
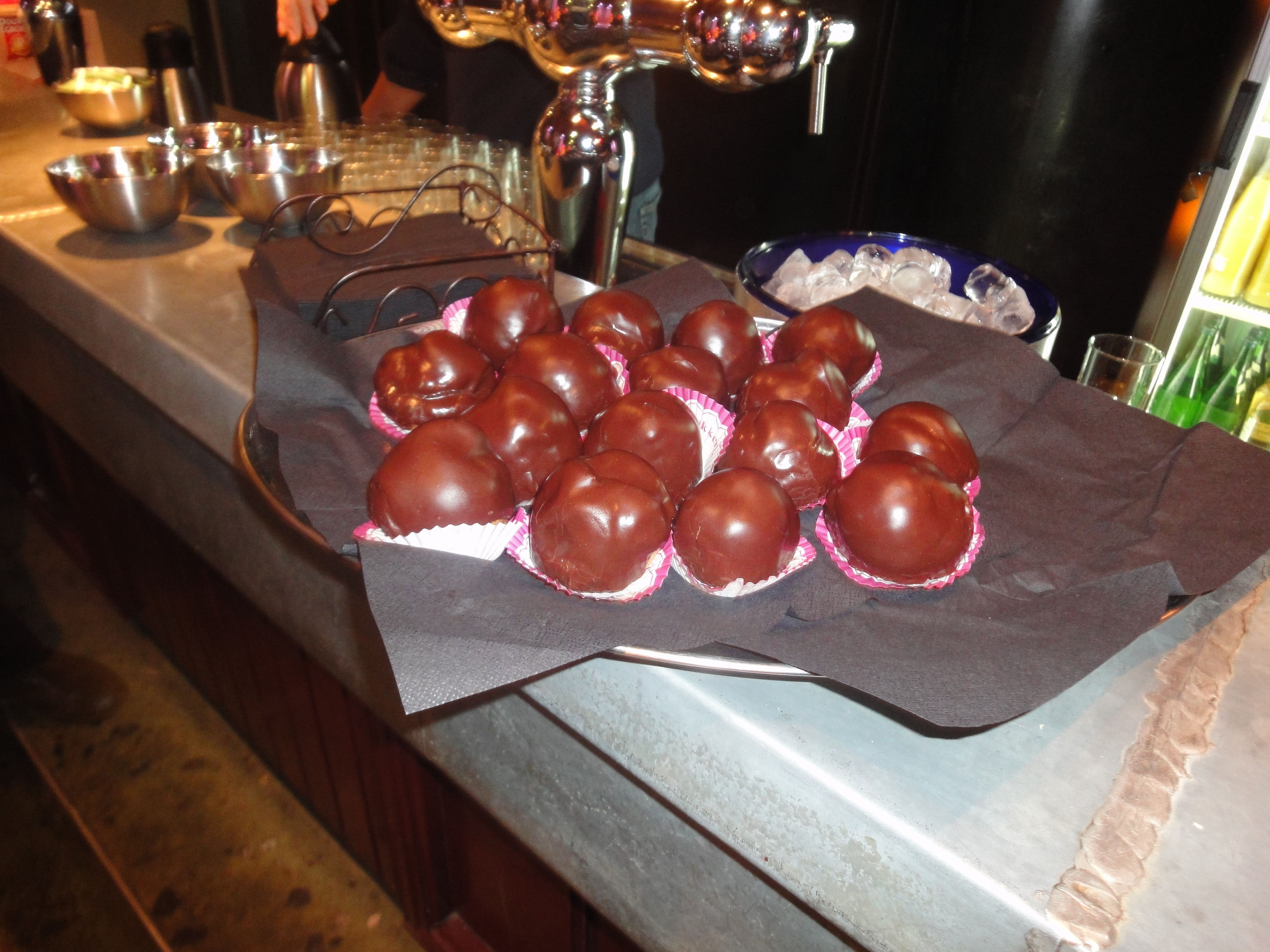
Bossche bollen

Even before the start of the 20th century, a predecessor of the Bossche Bol was being sold in Den Bosch by a baker named Lambermont, who had a store in a building called "De Kat" on the Vischstraat at number 61b. The ball made by Lambermont resembled a moorkop and was filled with custard.

In 1920, a baker from The Hague called Henri van der Zijde opened a shop in the same street at number 25, and invented a variation filled with whipped cream and covered with real chocolate, which his heirs see as the first real Bossche Bol. Later in the twenties Lambermont started selling a chocolate ball much like this one.

The name "Bossche bol" only became common once the pastry became popular outside of the city.

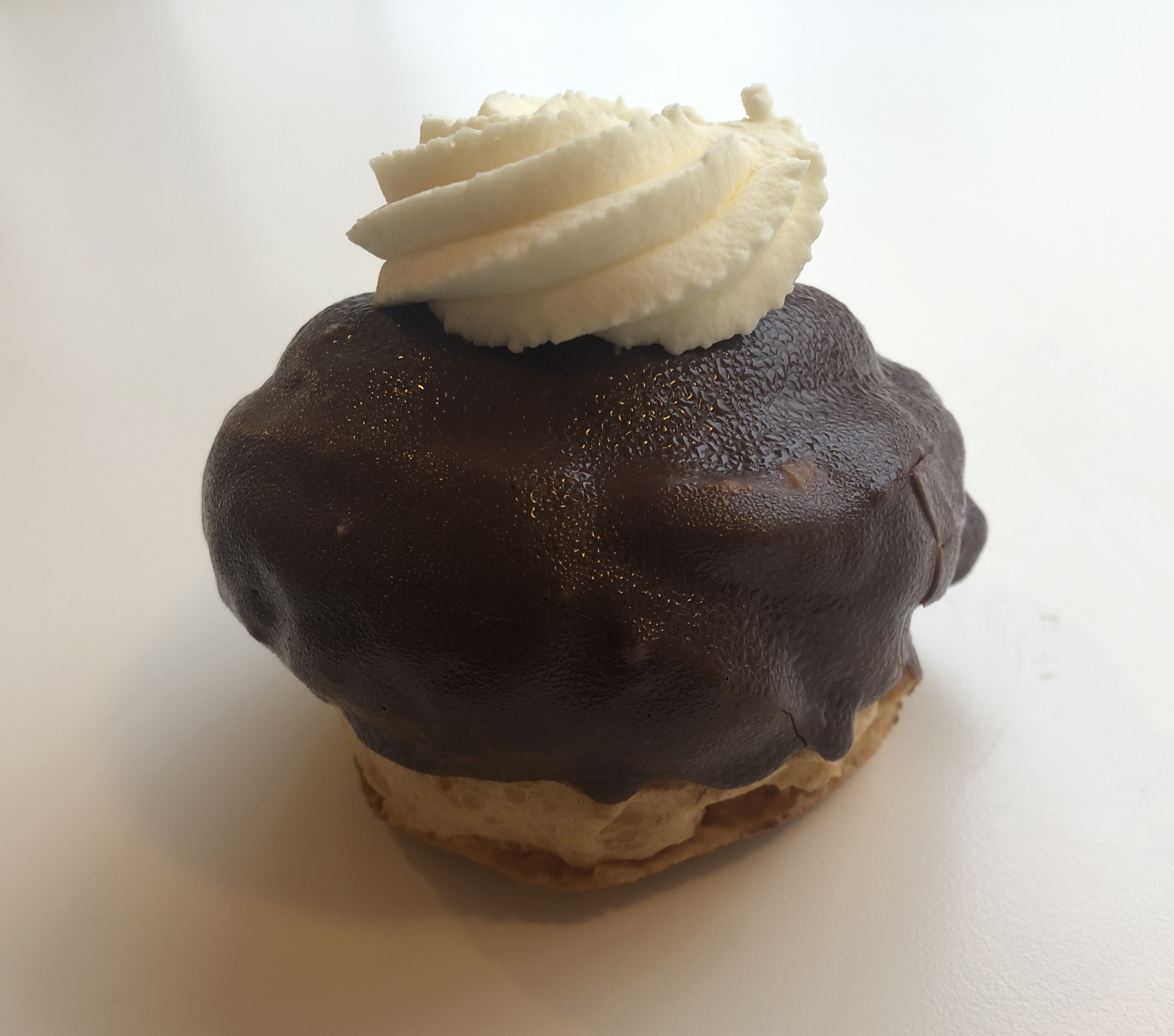
Dutch 'Moorkop', a similar pastry sold in much of the country.

The exact recipe varies between bakers, although the recipe that is now acknowledged as the "real Bossche Bol" is the one made and sold by the confectionery Jan de Groot.

== Similar foods ==
There is a version of the Bossche Bol twice the size, called a reuzenbol ("giant ball").

A similar, slightly smaller, common Dutch pastry is the Moorkop — a profiterole which is usually not glazed with chocolate per se, but instead with a chocolate-flavoured glaze, made with cocoa powder. Often a puff of whipped cream is put on top of a moorkop.

Despite having a similar etymological meaning as Moorkop ('Moors head') – a Negerzoen ('Negro Kiss'), is a completely different product. The filling of the Negerzoen is marshmallow, not whipped cream, and its coating is not profiterole but a thin layer of chocolate. After complaints calling the name Negerzoen as racist, the largest manufacturer rebranded them simply as '(Buys) Zoenen' ('Buys Kisses') in 2006. By contrast, the common Moorkoppen were not as criticised the same way, and continue to be widely sold, name unchanged. However, in order to cause less offence, some retailers now sell them under the name chocoladebol.

== See also ==
- List of choux pastry dishes
- List of pastries
