= La Religieuse =

La Religieuse may refer to:

== Books ==
- La Religieuse (novel), an 18th-century French novel by Denis Diderot

== Film ==
- The Nun (1966 film), a 1966 film adaptation of the novel, directed by Jacques Rivette
- The Nun (2013 film), a 2013 film adaptation of the novel, directed by Guillaume Nicloux

== Food ==
- Religieuse, a French pastry
- La religieuse, the crust of toasted cheese at the bottom of a pot of cheese fondue

== Music ==
- "La religieuse" (song), 1988 single by Celine Dion
- La Religieuse, 1875 choral work by Théodore Gouvy
