= St. Honoré cake =

French dessert

St. Honoré Cake
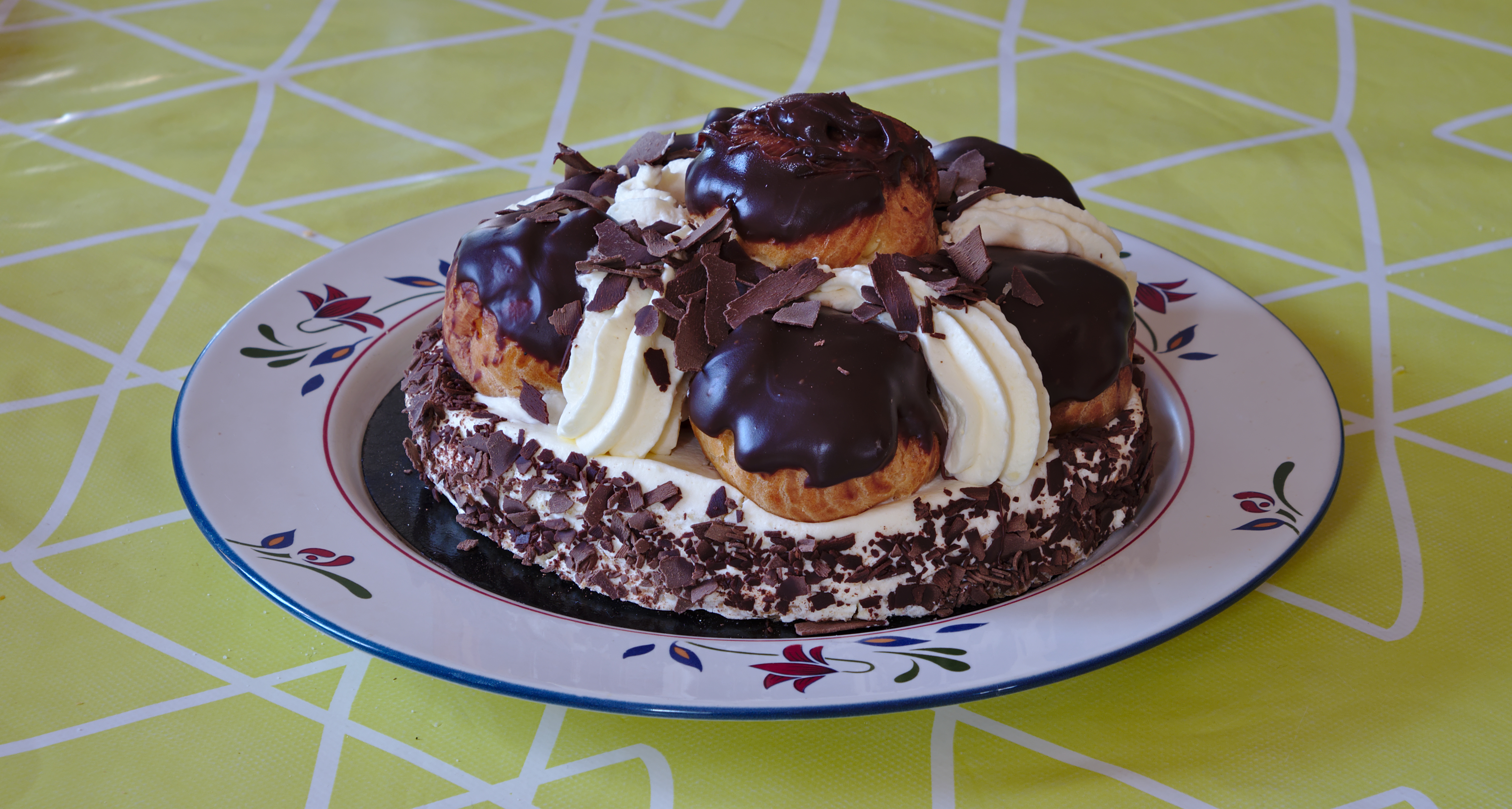
- St. Honoré cake with choux dipped in chocolate
- Type: Dessert
- Place of origin: France
- Created by: Auguste Julien, at pâtisserie Chiboust
- Main ingredients: Puff pastry, choux pastry, cream puffs, caramelised sugar, chiboust cream, whipped cream

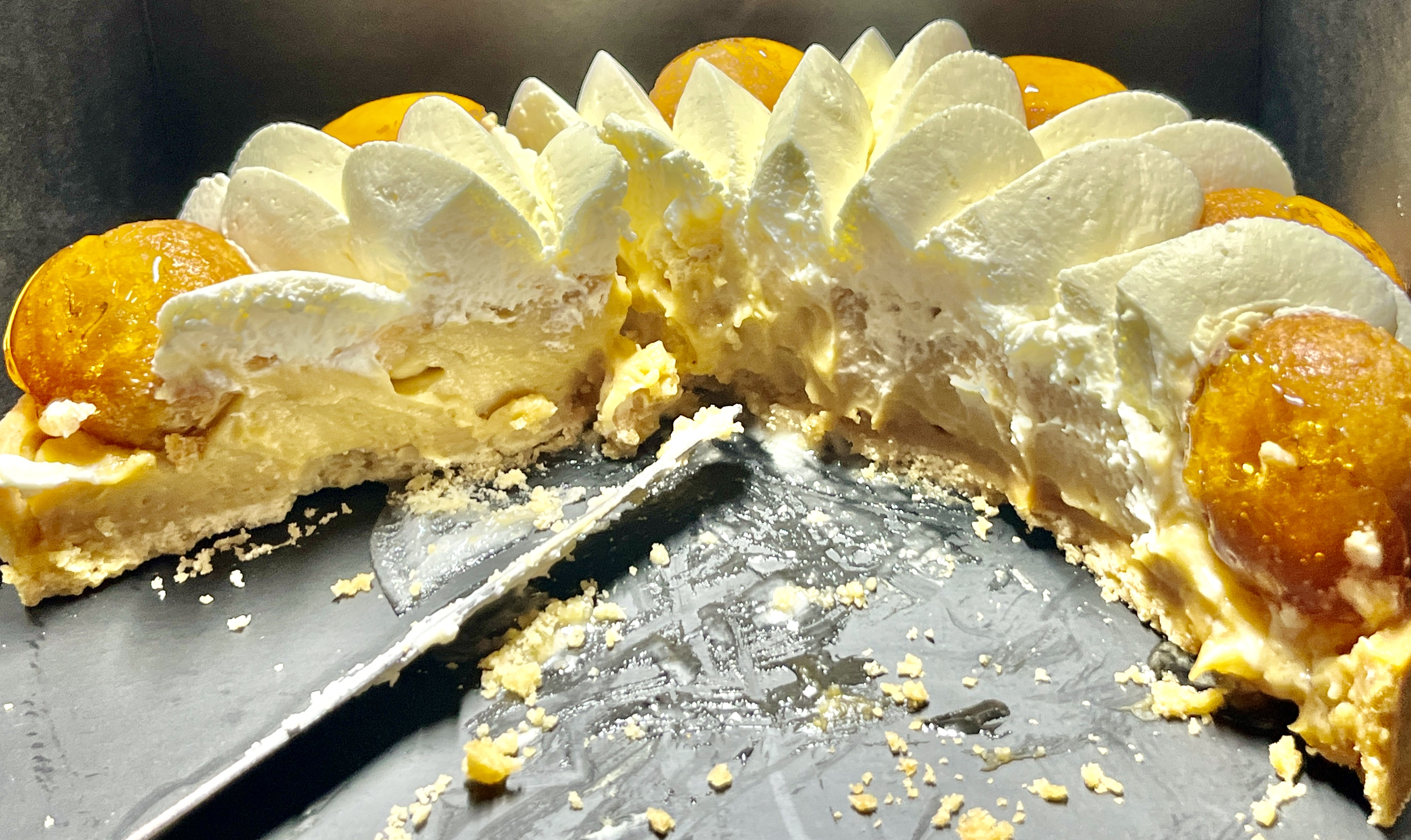
Saint-honoré cake cross-section

The St. Honoré cake, usually known by its French name gâteau St-Honoré, and also sometimes called St. Honoratus cake, is a dessert named for the French patron saint of bakers and pastry chefs, Saint Honoré or Honoratus (d. 600 AD), Bishop of Amiens. It was invented by Auguste Julien in the 1840s at the patisserie Chiboust on Rue Saint-Honoré in Paris.

Homemade Saint-Honoré cake with caramel-glazed choux puffs and piped cream.

This classic French dessert is a circle of shortcrust pastry at its base with a ring of pâte à choux piped on the outer edge. Baked choux puffs are dipped in caramelized sugar and attached side by side on top of the circle of the pâte à choux. Traditionally granulated sugar was sprinkled directly on the pastry and finished by holding a red hot iron close to the surface, but modern versions may use chocolate-dipped profiterole or dip the puffs in caramel stabilized with corn syrup or glucose syrup. This base is traditionally filled with crème chiboust and finished with whipped cream using a special St. Honoré piping tip.

== See also ==
- List of choux pastry dishes
