= Egg puffs and soup pearls =

Choux pastry croutons served with soup

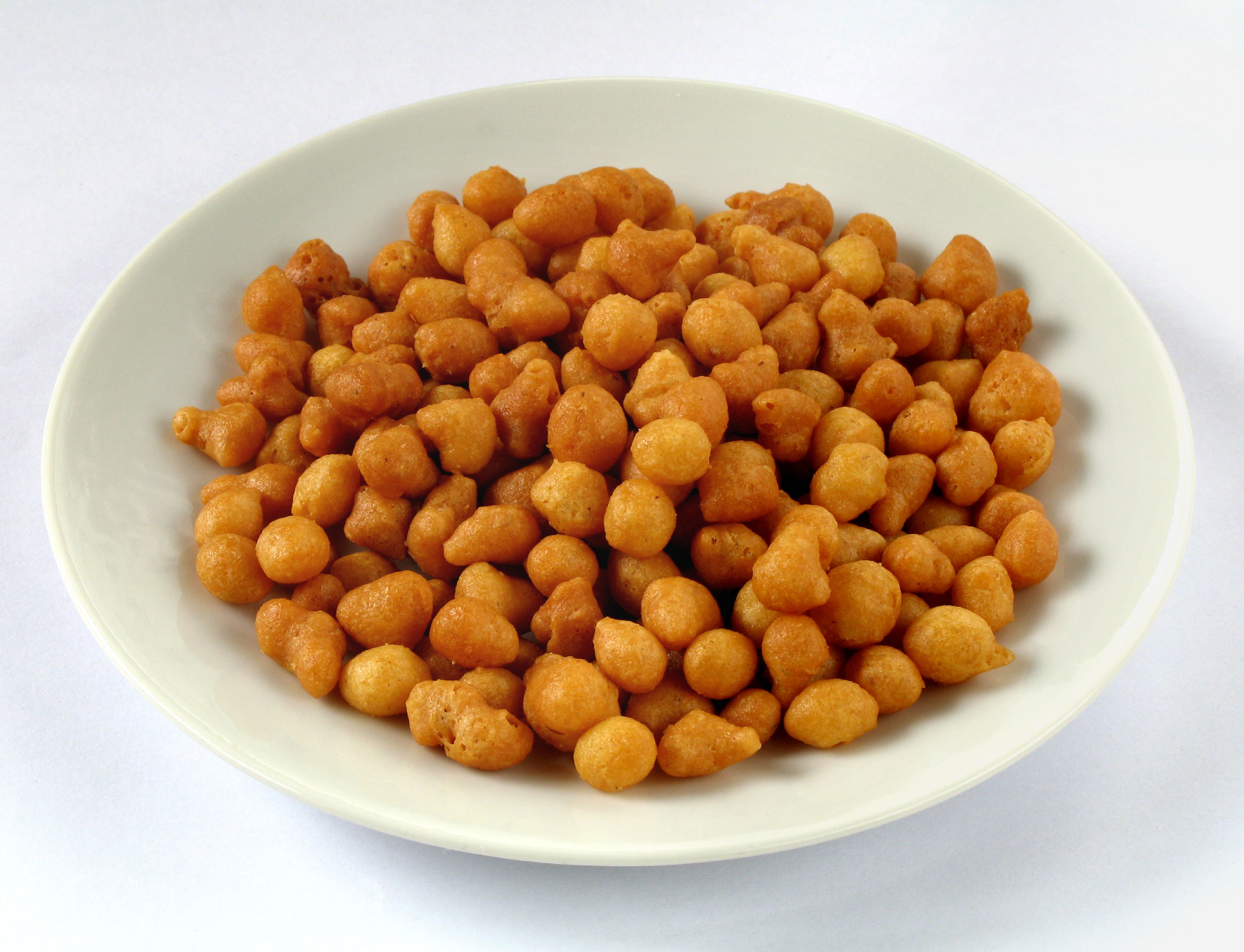
A bowl of soup pearls

Egg puffs and soup pearls are choux-pastry pellets, resembling chickpea seeds, that are popular in Central Europe. They are typically used to garnish soups, but can be used to decorate other kinds of food, including desserts, or eaten alone as snacks. Egg puffs are baked, whereas soup pearls are deep-fried.

== Names ==
Soup pearls are generally known in German as Backerbse (literally, "baked peas") or Mehlerbse ("flour peas"). In Swiss German, they are referred to as Suppenperle, or "soup pearls", in Hungarian as levesgyöngy "soup pearls" (hence the English name), while in the Vorarlberg region in western Austria, they are called Hochzeitsperle, or "wedding pearls". They also used to be called Hochzitbolla in Austria. Another typically Austrian name for these pellets is Bufferl, whose Upper Swabian equivalent is Bopfrlâ.

"Egg puffs" is an English calque translation of the German Eierschöberl. In Polish, these are known as groszek ptysiowy, or "puff peas".
