= Éclair =

Cream-filled choux pastry

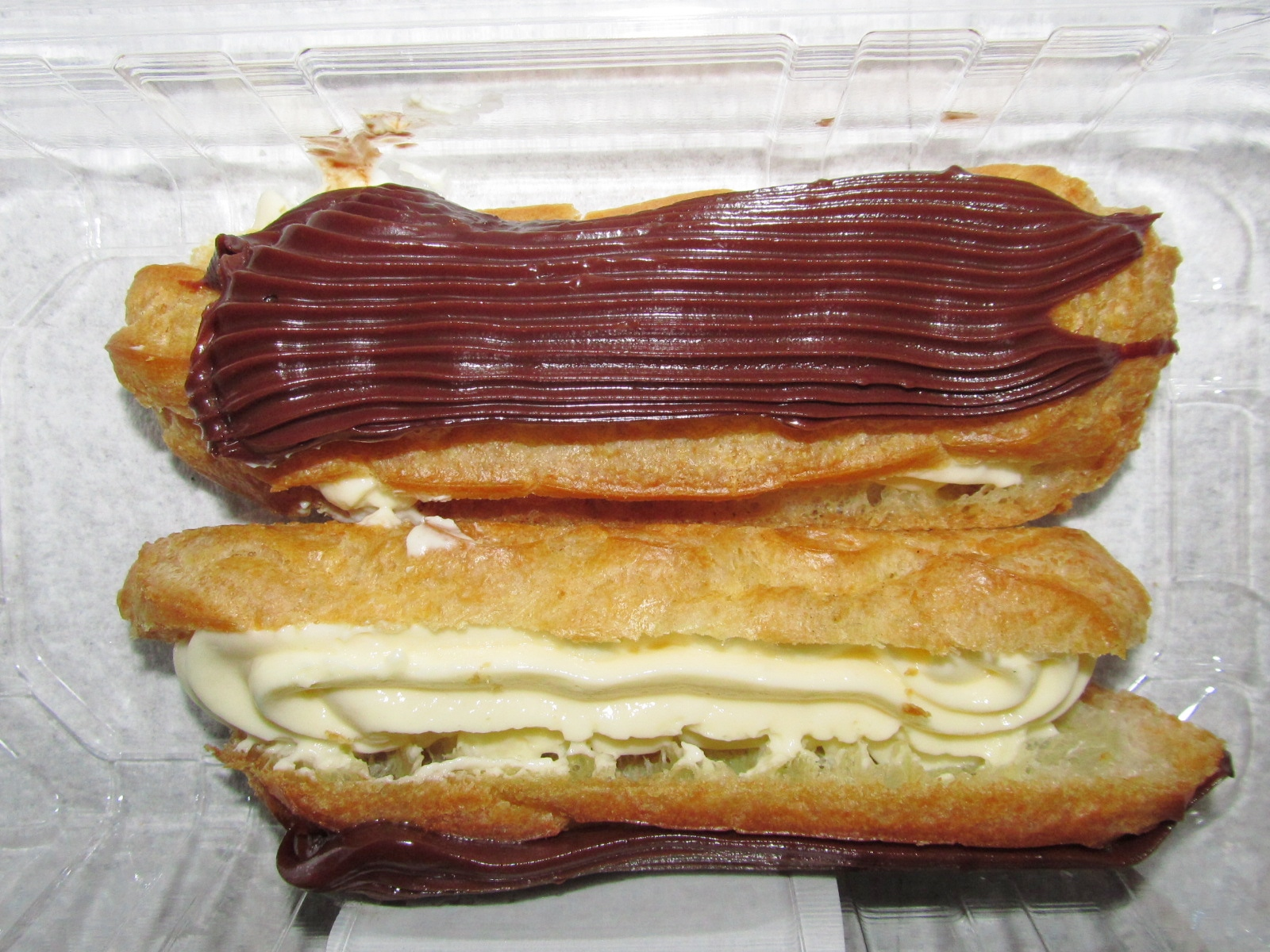
- Type: Pastry
- Place of origin: France
- Associated cuisine: French
- Main ingredients: Choux pastry, flavored cream filling, icing

An éclair (English: /ɪˈklɛər/ ih-KLAIR or /eɪˈklɛər/ ay-KLAIR) is a pastry made with choux dough filled with a cream and topped with a flavored icing. The dough, which is the same as that used for profiteroles, is typically piped into an oblong shape with a pastry bag and baked until it is crisp and hollow inside. Once cool, the pastry is filled with custard (crème pâtissière), whipped cream or chiboust cream, then iced with fondant icing. Other fillings include pistachio- and rum-flavored custard, fruit-flavored fillings or chestnut purée. When the icing is caramel, the dessert may be called a bâton de Jacob (lit. 'Jacob's staff'). A similar pastry in a round, rather than oblong, shape is called a religieuse.

== Etymology ==
The word comes from the French éclair [eklɛːʁ], meaning 'flash of lightning', so named because it is eaten quickly (in a flash); however some believe that the name is due to the glistening of the frosting resembling lightning.

== History ==
The éclair originated during the 19th century in Lyon, France where it was called pain à la Duchesse ('Duchess-style bread') or petite duchesse ('little duchess') until 1850. The word is first attested both in English and in French in the 1860s.

== Variants ==
Dunkin' Donuts markets Long John donuts as eclairs in the United States. National Eclair Day is celebrated on June 22 in the U.S.

In Brazil, a dessert resembling a miniature éclair is known as a Carolina.

== Photo gallery ==
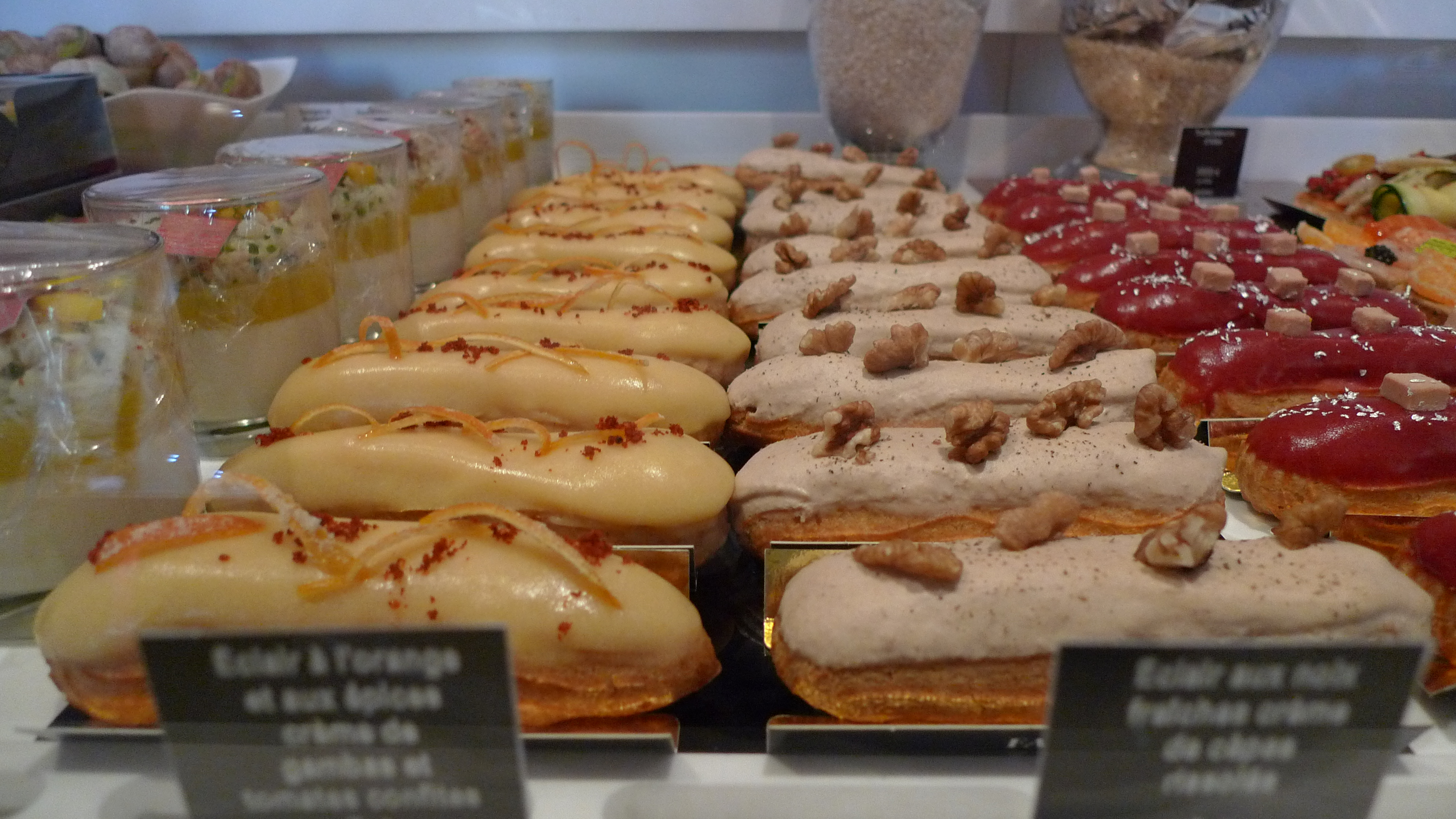
Éclairs at Fauchon in Paris.

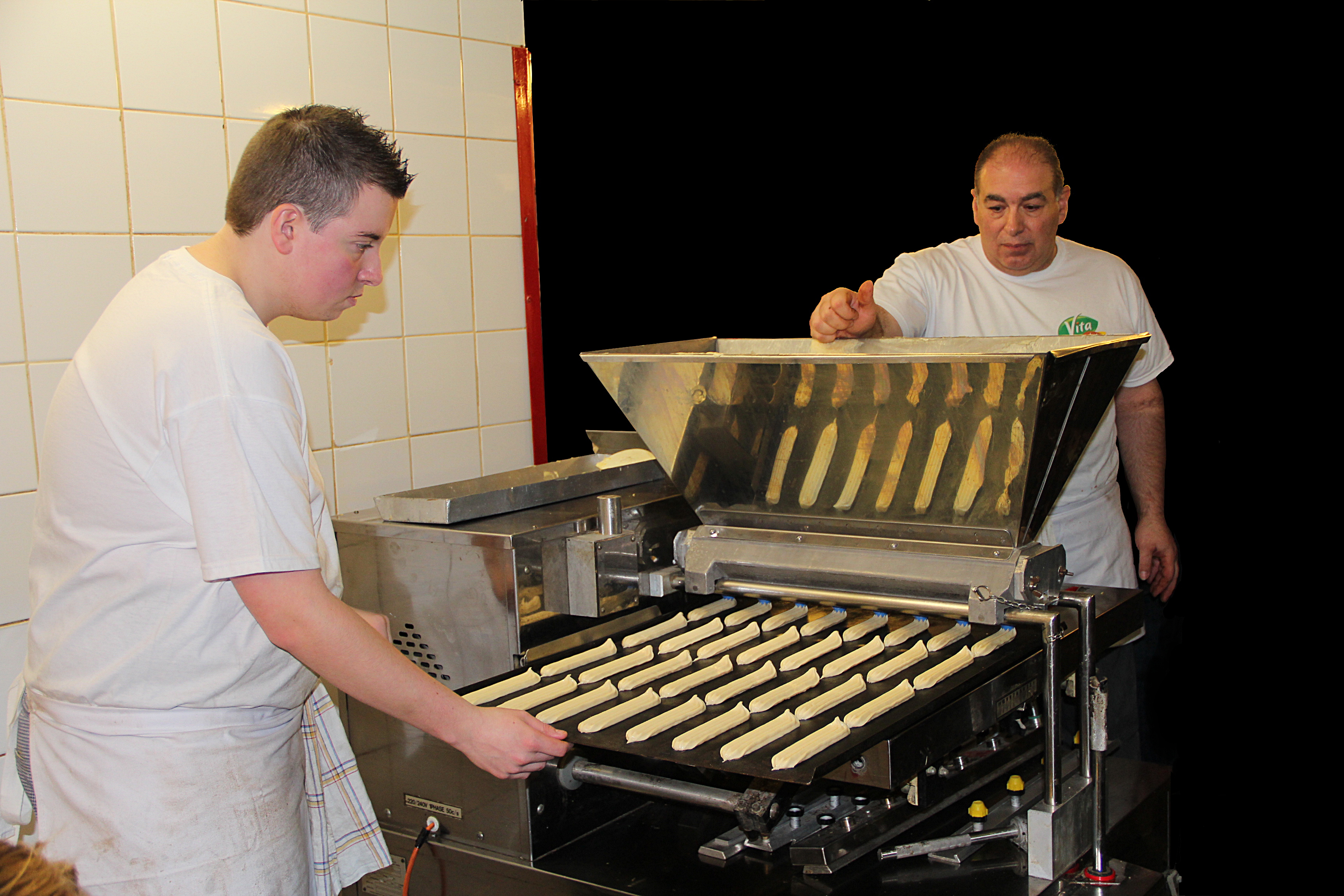
Bakers in Belgium using a machine to make éclairs

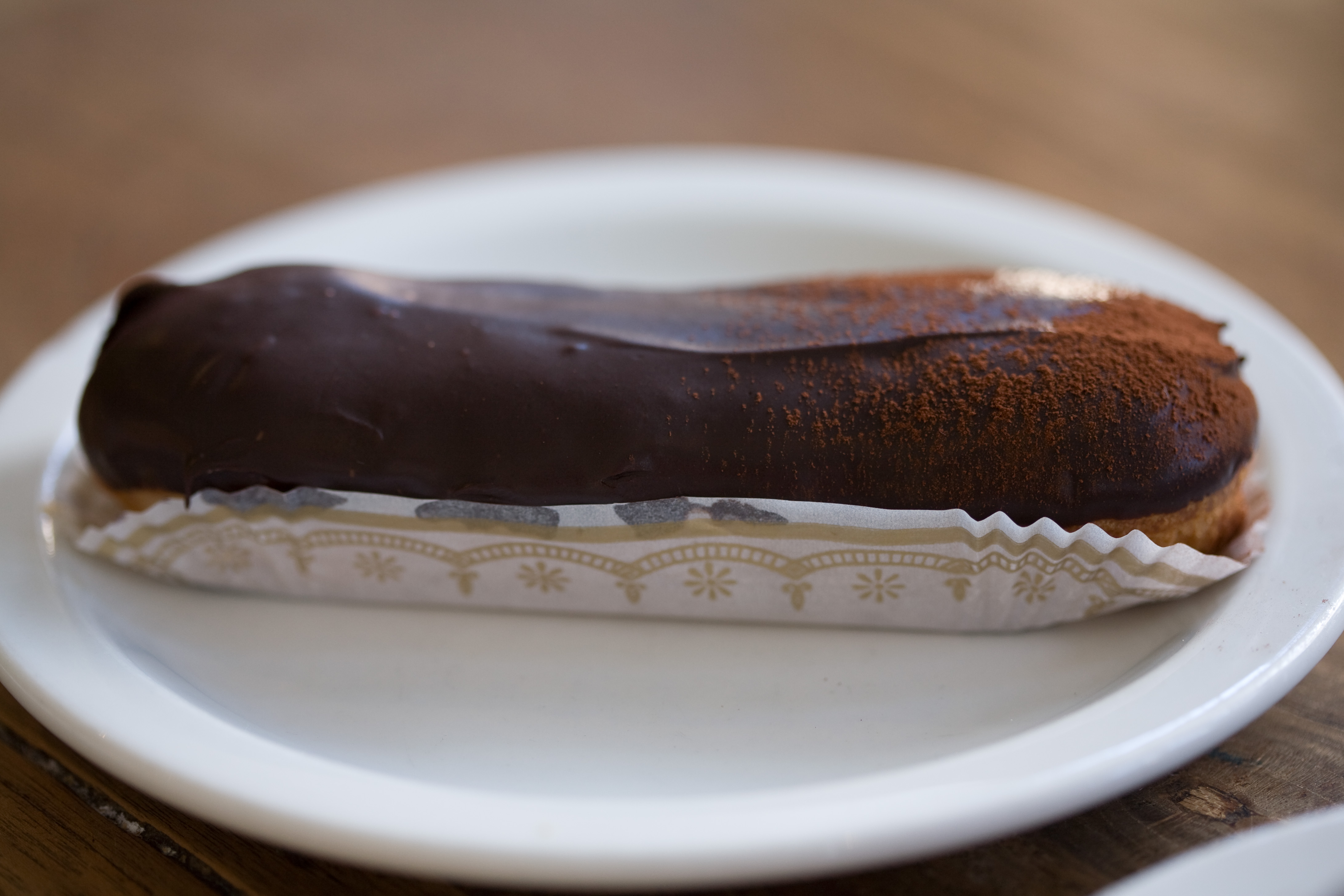
A classic éclair

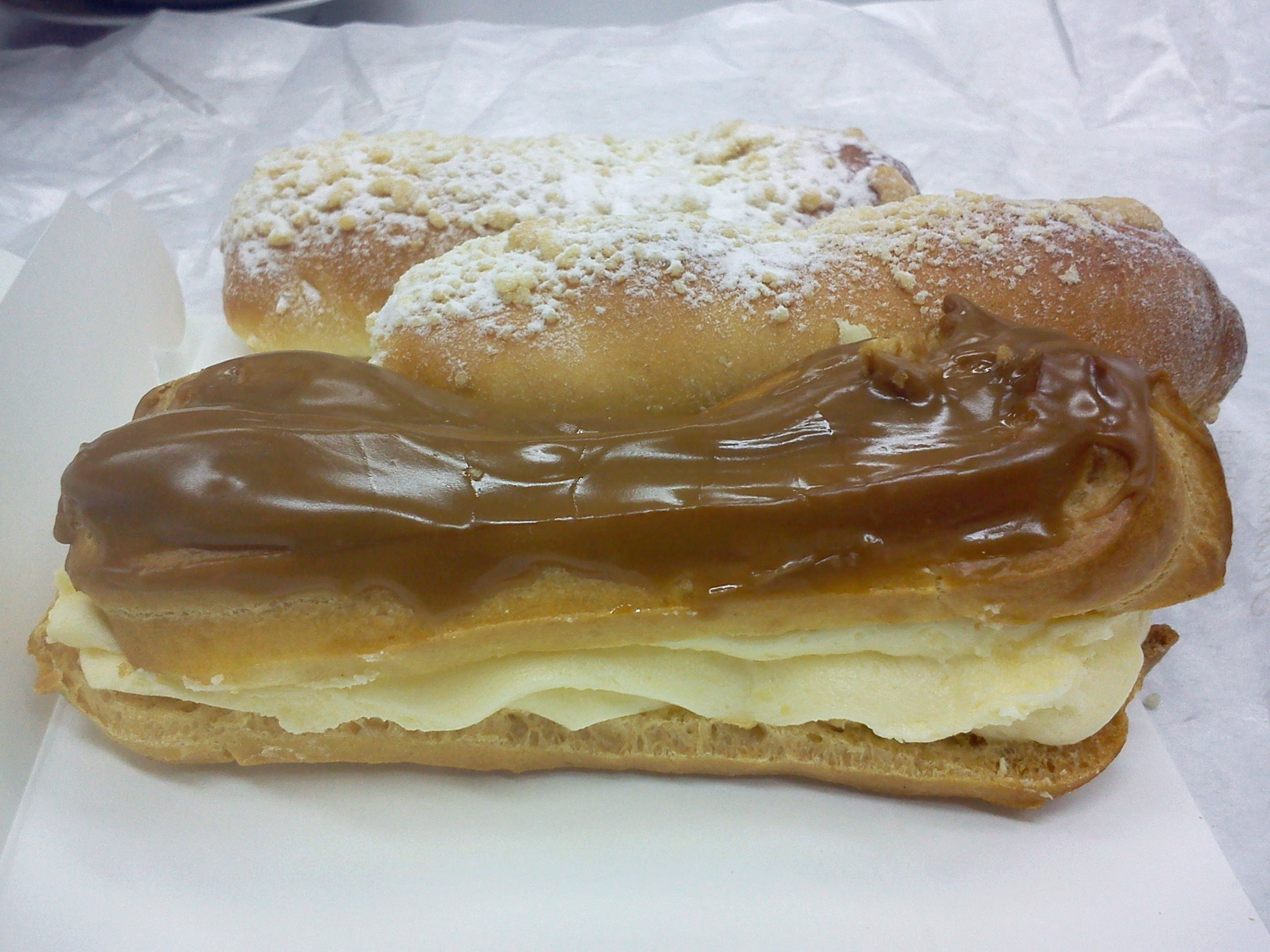
Polish Éclair from Poznań.

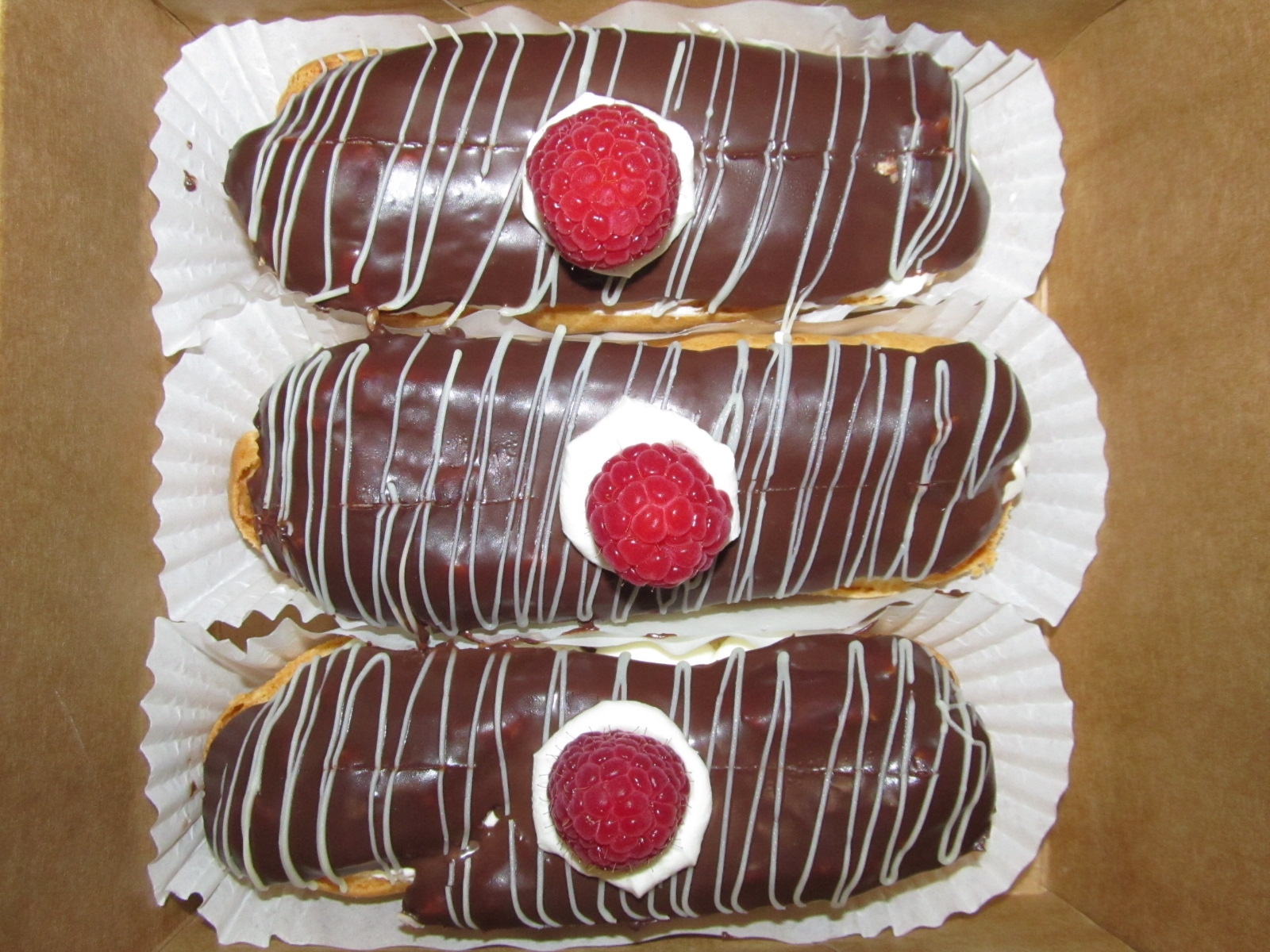
Éclairs prepared for National Chocolate Eclair Day on June 22

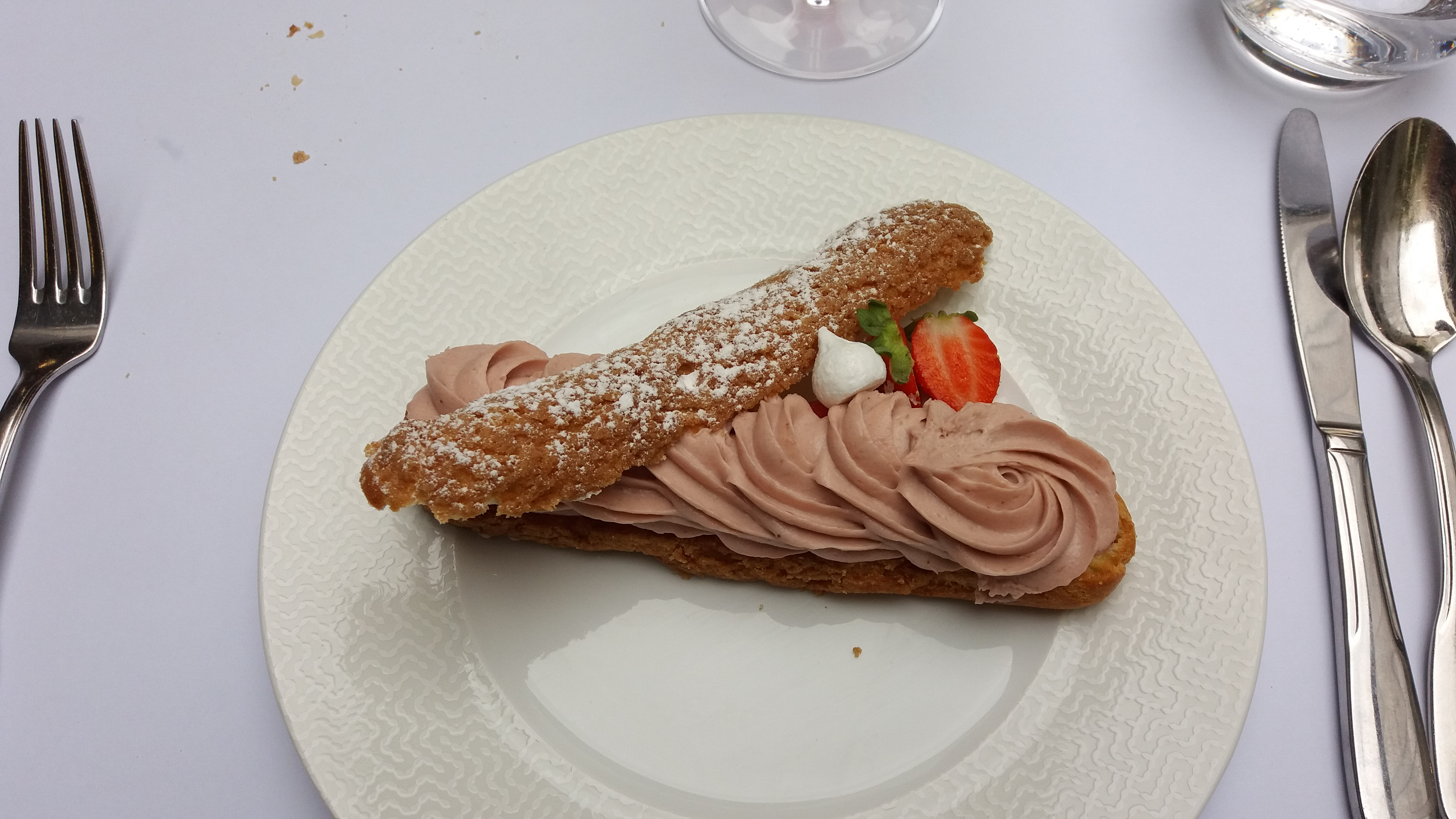
Éclair with strawberry

== See also ==
- French cuisine
- List of choux pastry dishes
- List of custard desserts
- List of French desserts
