= Profiterole =

Cream-filled choux pastry dessert

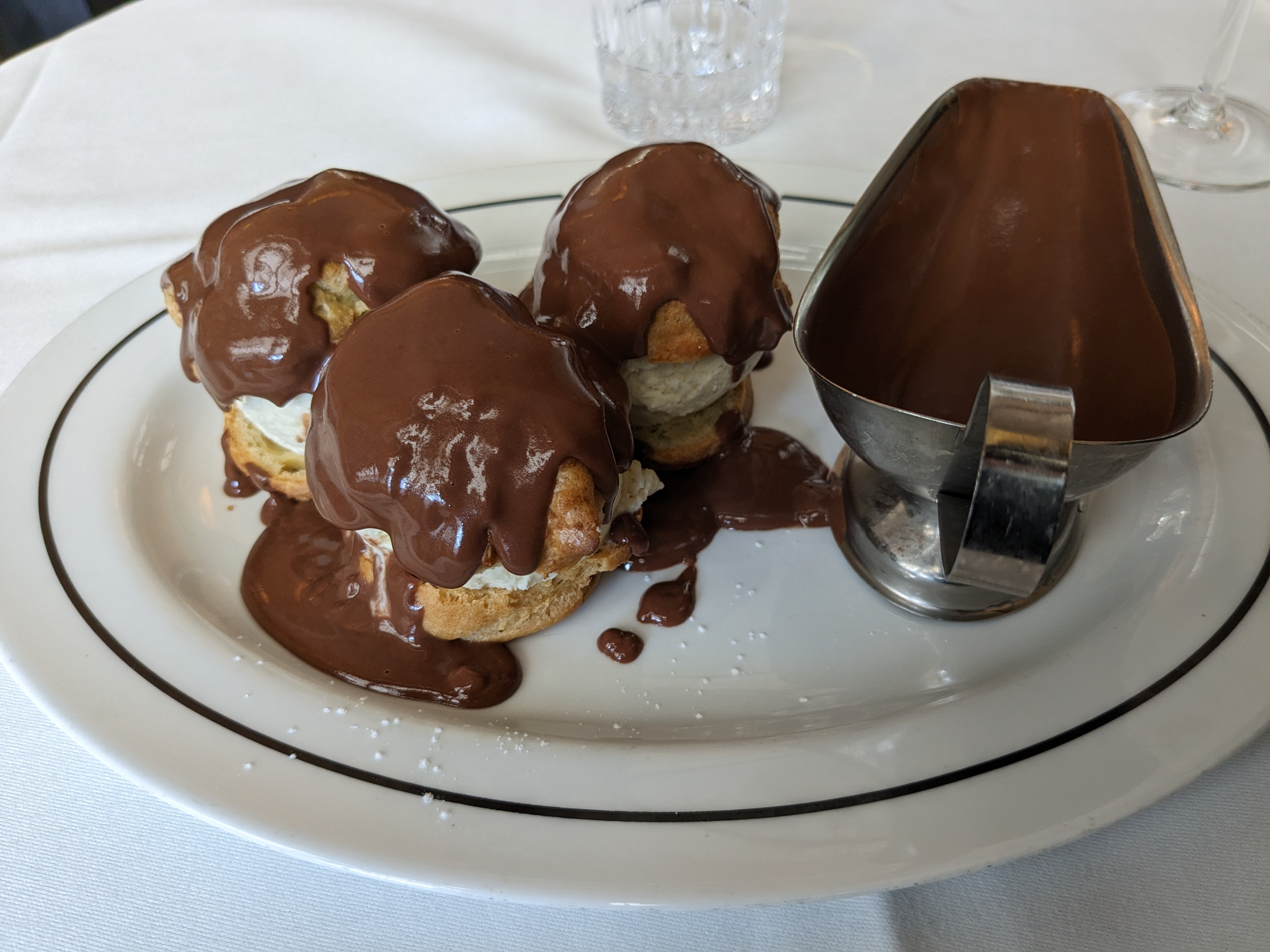
- Profiteroles au chocolat, chou with ice cream and chocolate ganache, at Le Vaudeville, a brasserie on Rue Vivienne in Paris
- Alternative names: Cream puff (US)
- Place of origin: France
- Main ingredients: Choux pastry Filling: whipped cream, custard, or ice cream
- Other information: Water based, milk based

A profiterole (French: [pʁɔfitʁɔl]), or chou à la crème (French: [ʃu a la kʁɛm]), known as a cream puff in the US and Canada, is a filled French choux pastry ball with a typically sweet and moist filling of whipped cream, custard, pastry cream, or ice cream. They may be garnished with chocolate sauce, caramel, or a dusting of powdered sugar.

Savory profiteroles are also made, filled with pureed meats, cheese, and so on. These were formerly common garnishes for soups. The various names may be associated with particular variants of filling or sauce in different places.

Alan Davidson draws a distinction between profiteroles and cream puffs, describing profiteroles as smaller.

== Preparation ==
Choux pastry dough is piped through a pastry bag or dropped with a pair of spoons into small balls and baked to form largely hollow puffs. After cooling, the baked profiteroles are injected with filling using a pastry bag and narrow piping tip, or by slicing off the top, filling them, and reassembling. For sweet profiteroles, additional glazes or decorations may then be added.

== Presentation ==
The most common presentations are pastry cream, whipped cream, or ice cream filling, topped with powdered sugar or chocolate ganache and possibly more whipped cream. They are also served plain, with a crisp caramel glaze, iced, or with fruit.

Filled and glazed with caramel, they are assembled into a type of pièce montée called croquembouches, often served at weddings in France and Italy, during the Christmas holiday in France, and are served during important celebrations in Gibraltar. Profiteroles are also used as the outer wall of a St. Honoré cake.

== History ==
The French word profiterole, 'small profit, gratification', has been used in cuisine since the 16th century.

In the 17th century, profiteroles were small hollow bread rolls filled with a mixture of sweetbreads, truffles, artichoke bottoms, mushrooms, pieces of partridge, pheasant, or various poultry, accompanied by garnish. They could also be served in a soup.

François Massialot in Le Cuisinier royal et bourgeois (1698) gives several recipes for profiterole soup, with fillings of minced ham and poultry on a stew of mushrooms, asparagus, artichoke bottoms, rooster crests, sweetbreads, and truffles. The profiteroles are made of bread dough.

Joseph Menon in his Traité de cuisine (1732) and François Marin in Les Dons de Comus (1750) give other examples of savory recipes while keeping the same principle.

The profiteroles we know today, using choux pastry, were created in the 19th century.

Jules Gouffé in his Livre de cuisine (1870) explains that a profiterole is a small choux pastry. Gustave Garlin in Le Cuisinier moderne (1887) mentions profiteroles filled with cream and glazed with chocolate or coffee, worked to be smooth and shiny.

A widely-repeated legend claims that choux pastry, the key ingredient of profiteroles, was invented by the head chef to the court of Catherine de' Medici, but this is a 19th-century invention.

The pastry cook's art of choux pastry began to develop around the 17th century. The patissier Jean Avice developed the pastry further in the middle of the 18th century and created choux buns, with the dough becoming known as 'pâte à choux', since only choux buns were made from it. In the 19th century, Antoine Carême developed the recipe used today.

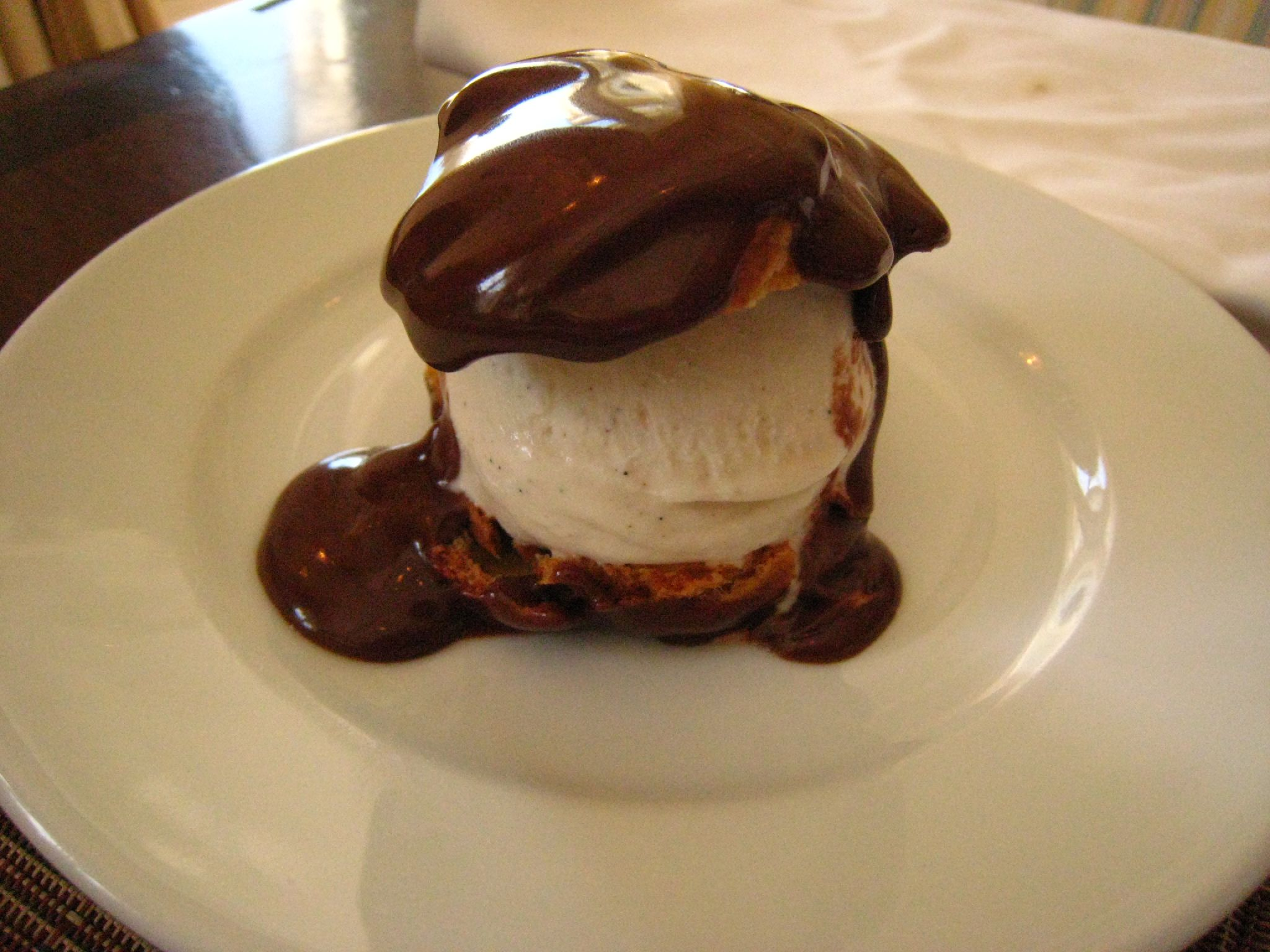
Single profiterole with ice cream and chocolate ganache

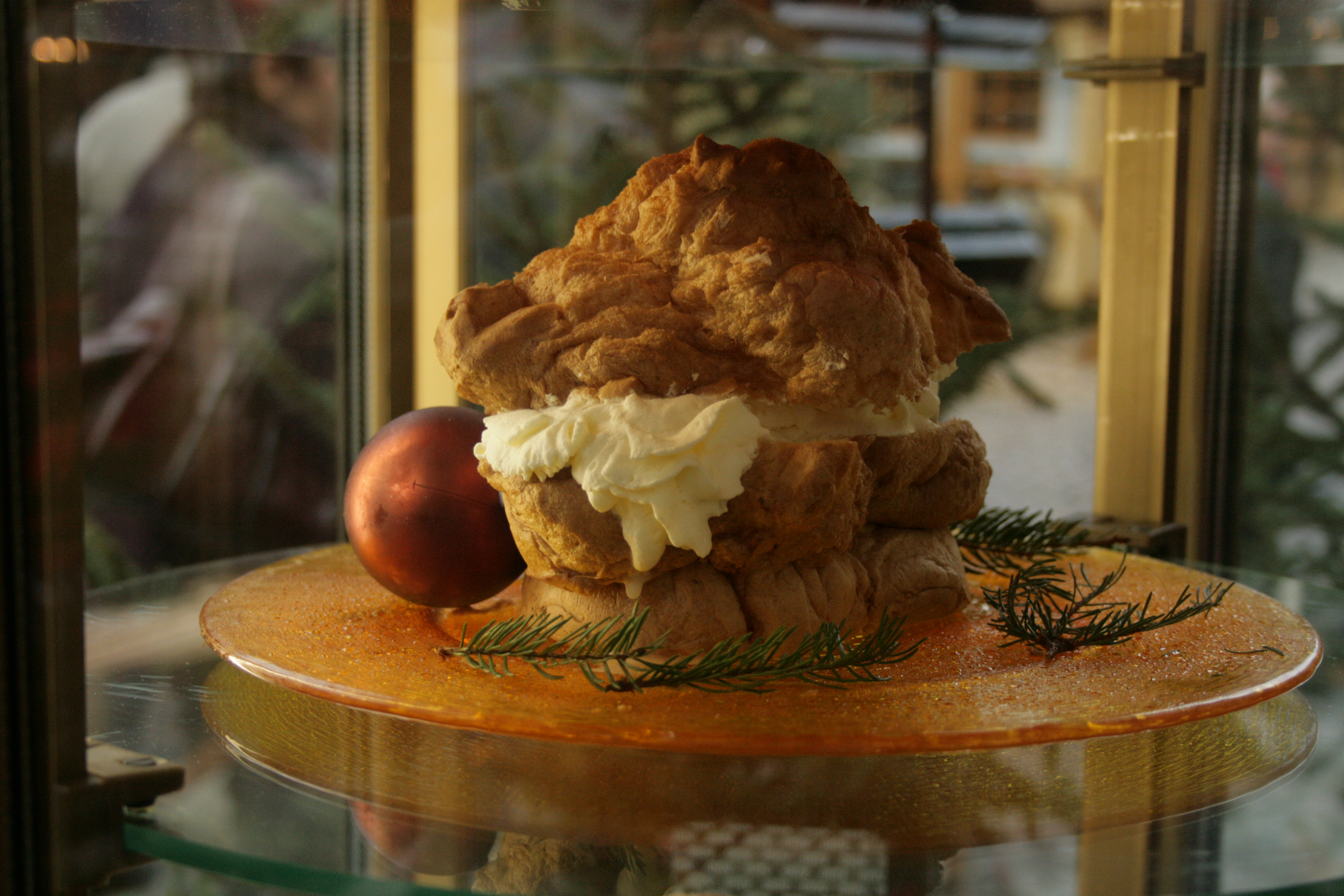
A German version, known as a Windbeutel

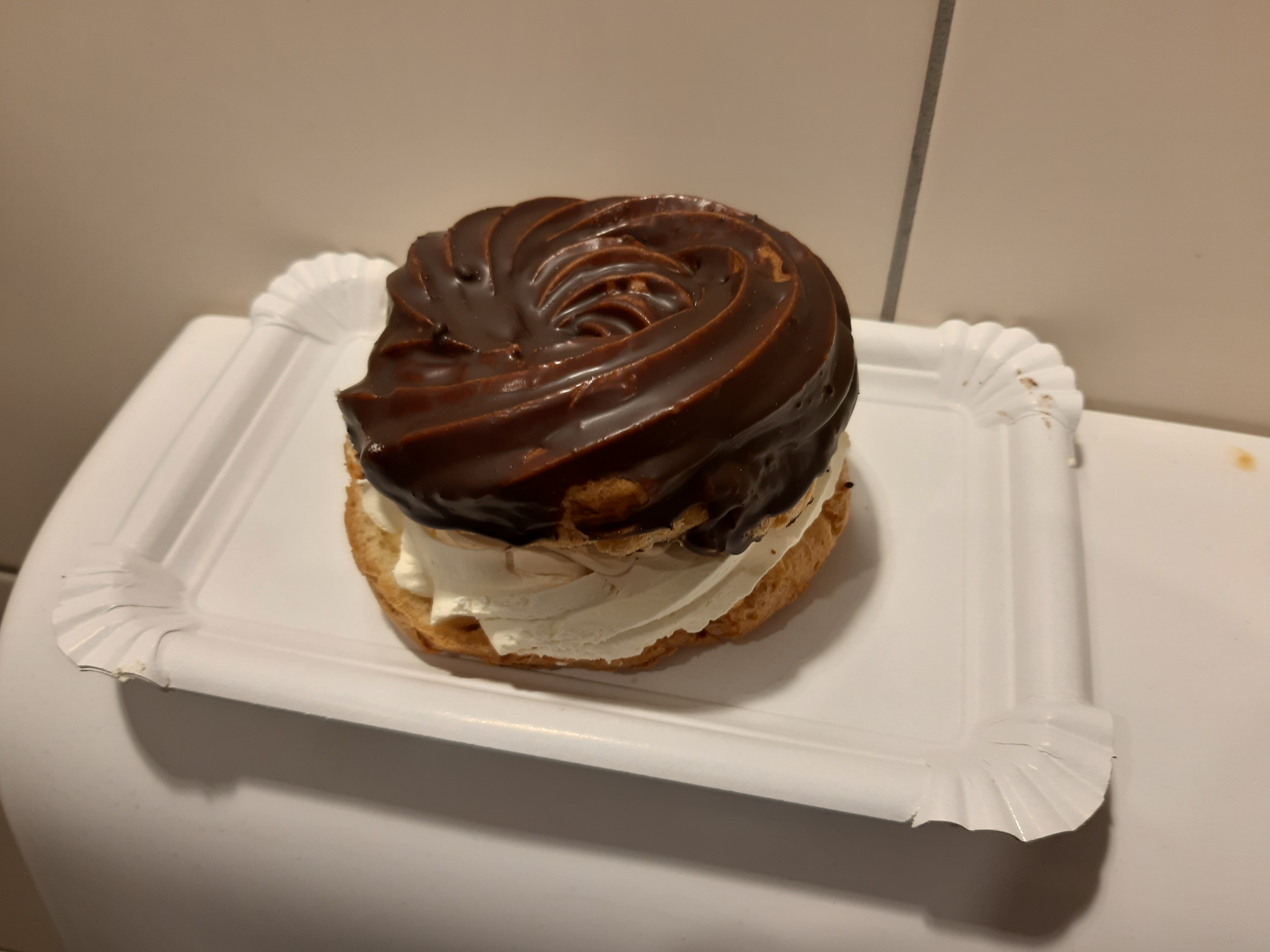
A Czech version ("větrník") with chocolate

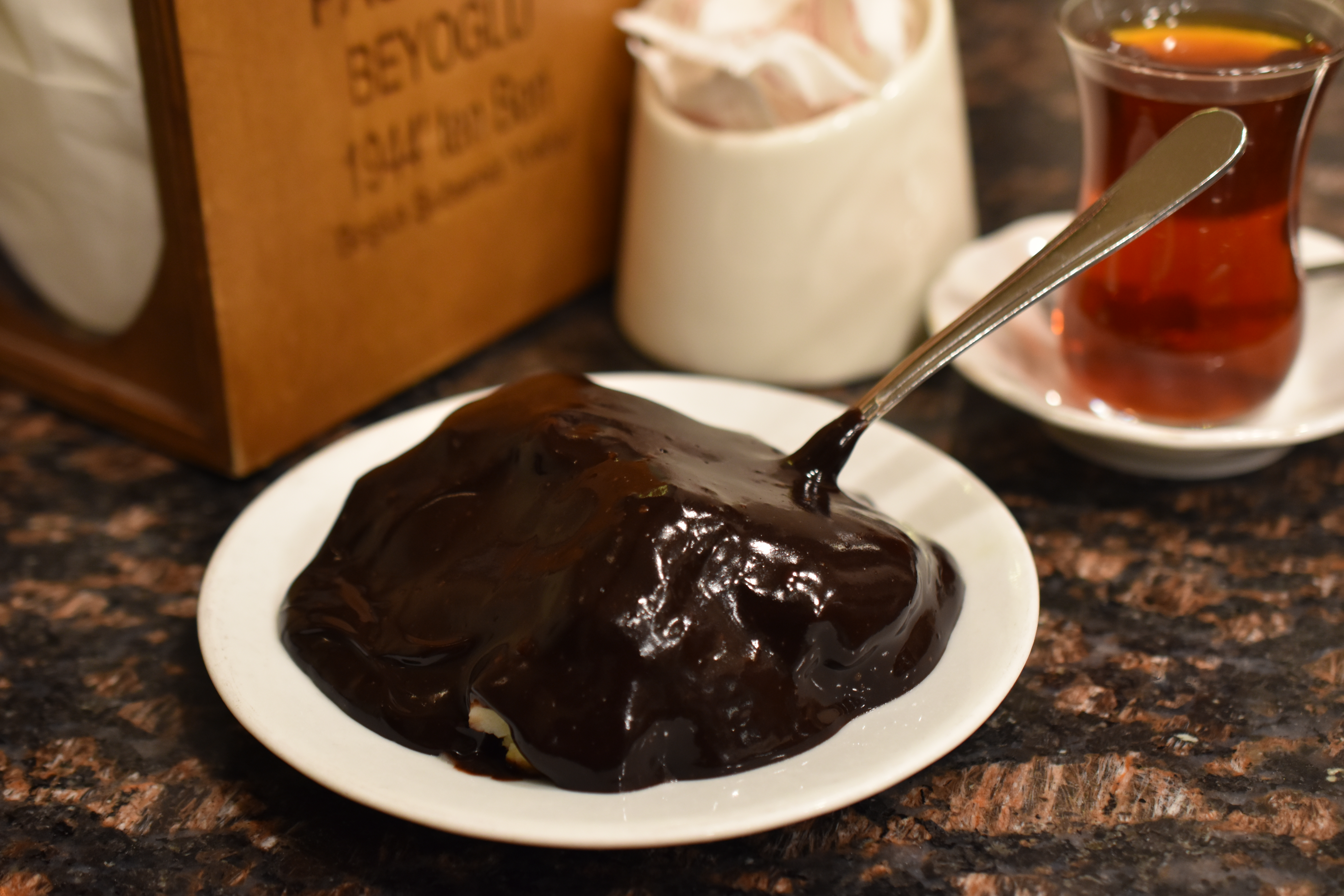
A Turkish version

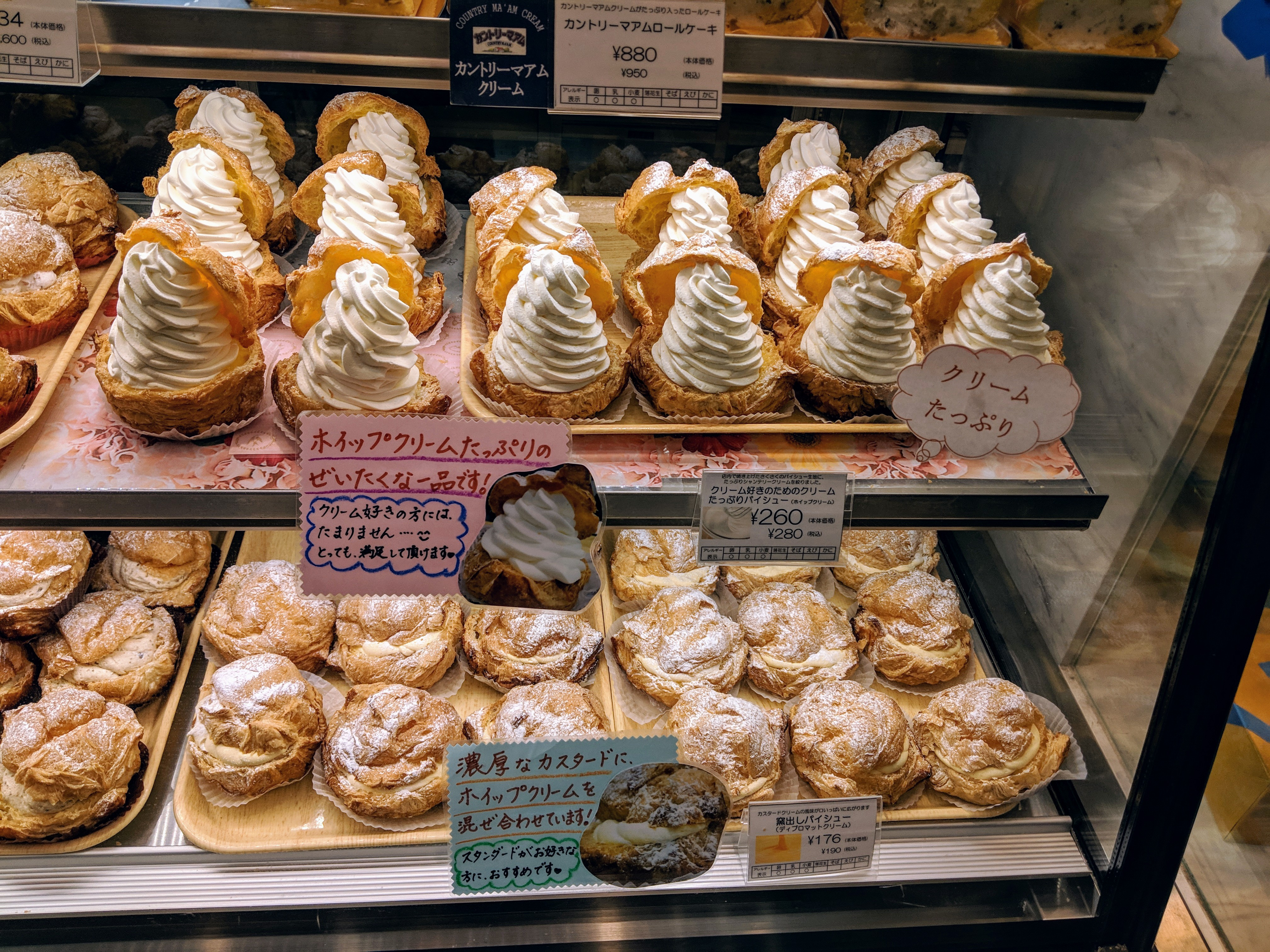
Japanese cream puffs at a Fujiya store in Tokyo

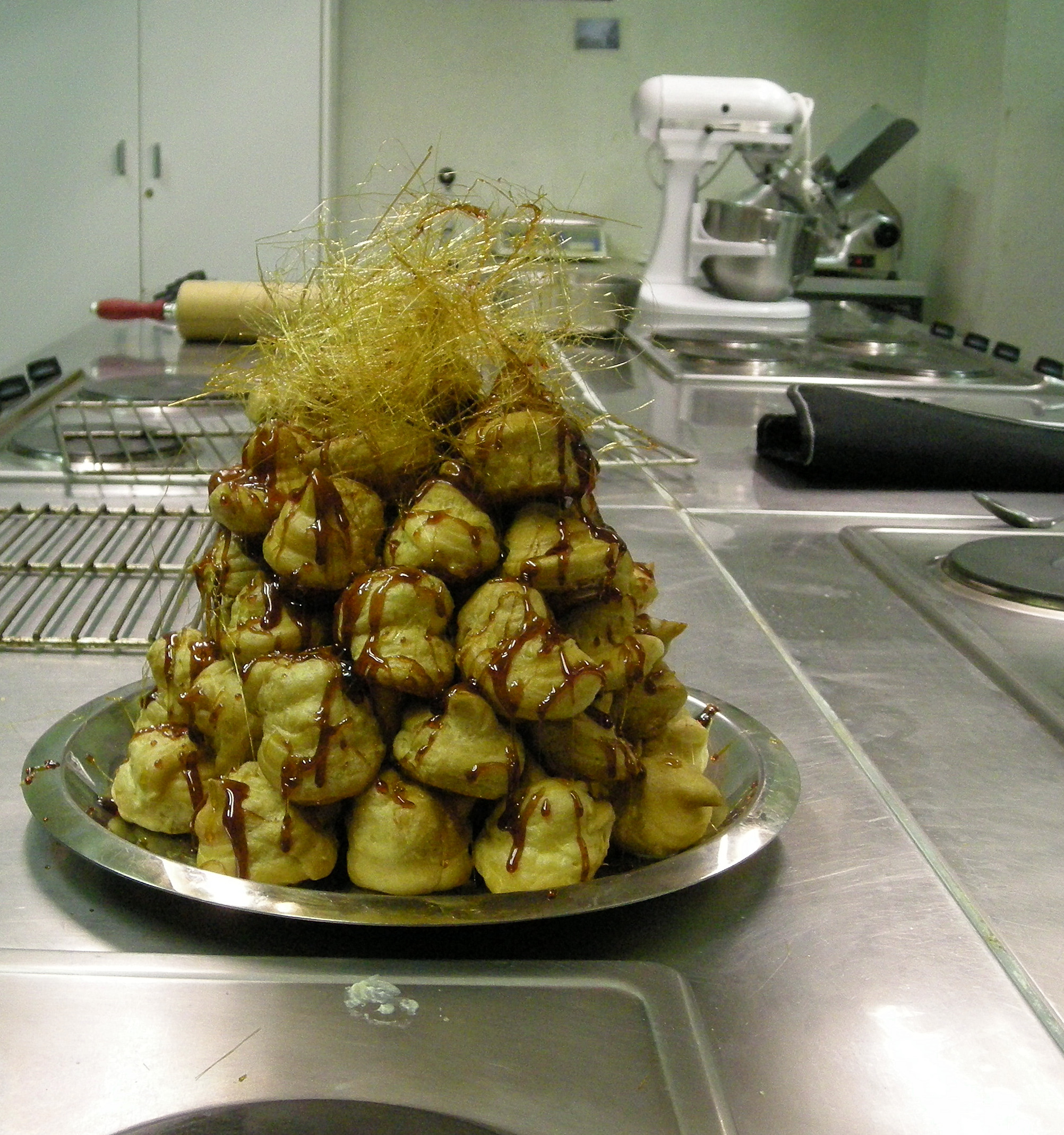
A large stack of profiteroles covered in caramel sauce

== Outside of France ==
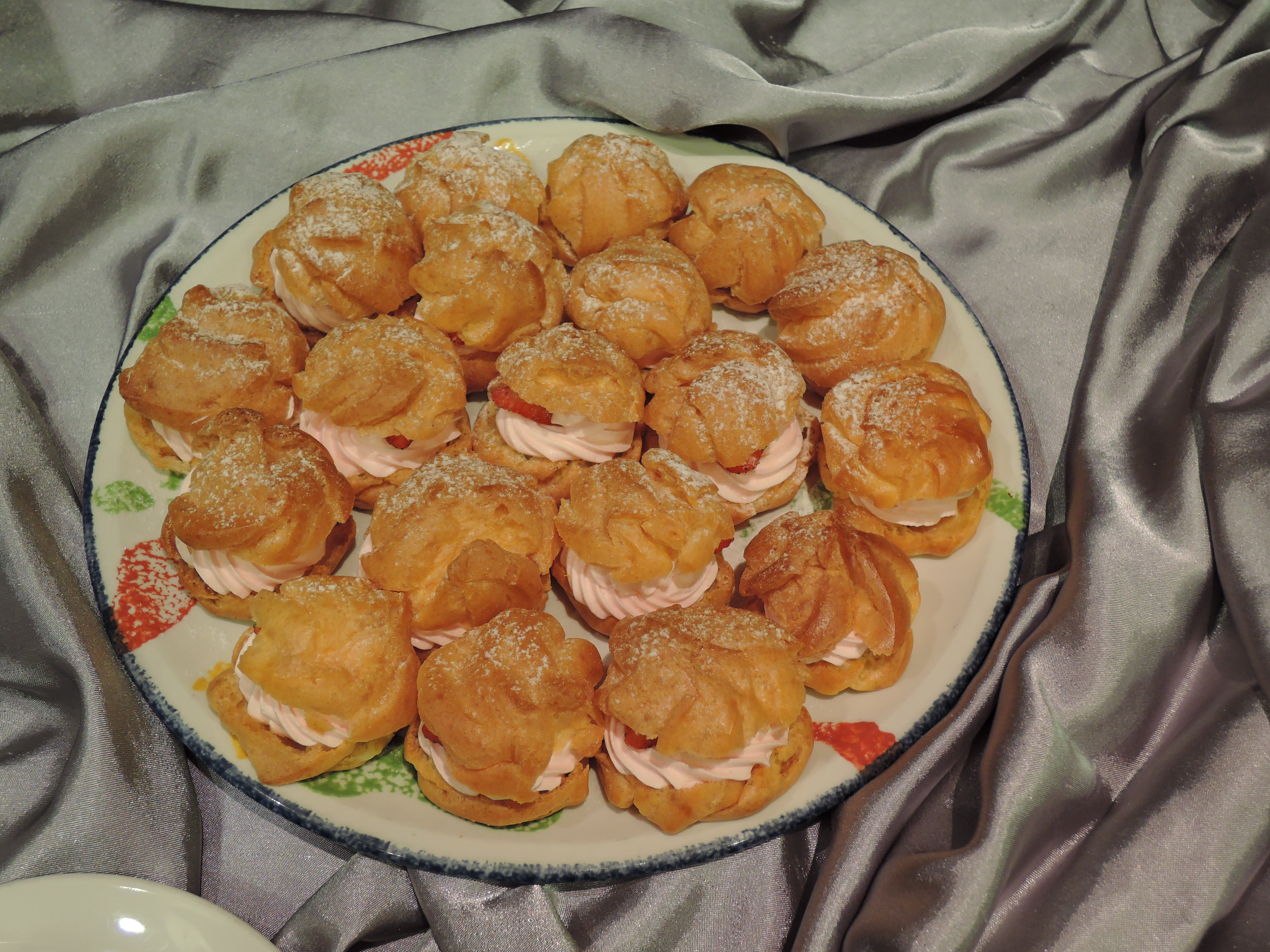
A plate of cream puffs

Cream puffs have appeared on U.S. restaurant menus since at least 1851. The Wisconsin State Fair is known for its giant cream puffs. In Hawaii, coco puffs (not to be confused with Cocoa Puffs) made by Liliha Bakery are a popular dessert. They are filled with chocolate creme patissiere and topped with a frosting known as "chantilly" (similar to German chocolate cake sans coconut and nuts).

Cream puffs were introduced to Japan by the early 20th century, and by the 21st century were so popular under the name Shu-cream that they were regarded as a Japanese dessert, even as the French origins were popularly understood.

== See also ==
- Bossche bol – a giant profiterole from the Dutch city of Den Bosch
- Éclair – a differently-shaped choux and cream pastry
- Gougère – an hors d'oeuvre made with choux pastry
- List of French desserts
- Moorkop – a similar Dutch pastry
- Whoopie pie – a similarly shaped pastry
