= Moorkop =

Glazed pastry filled with whipped cream

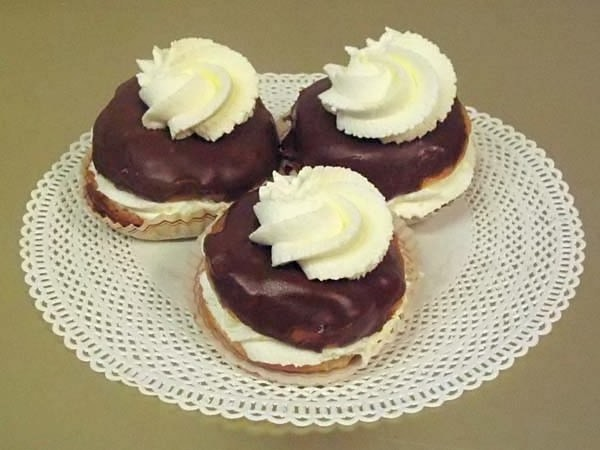
- Moorkoppen
- Type: Choux pastry
- Place of origin: Netherlands, Germany
- Main ingredients: Profiterole, whipped cream, white or dark chocolate

A moorkop (Dutch: [ˈmoːrkɔp]) is a traditional pastry from the Netherlands consisting of a profiterole (cream puff) filled with whipped cream. The top of the profiterole is glazed with dark chocolate. Often there is whipped cream on the top, with a slice of tangerine or a piece of pineapple.

The name moorkop translates literally as "moor's head". In order to cause less offence, some retailers now sell them under the name chocoladebol.

== See also ==
- List of choux pastry dishes
- List of pastries
