= Pommes dauphine =

Potato dish

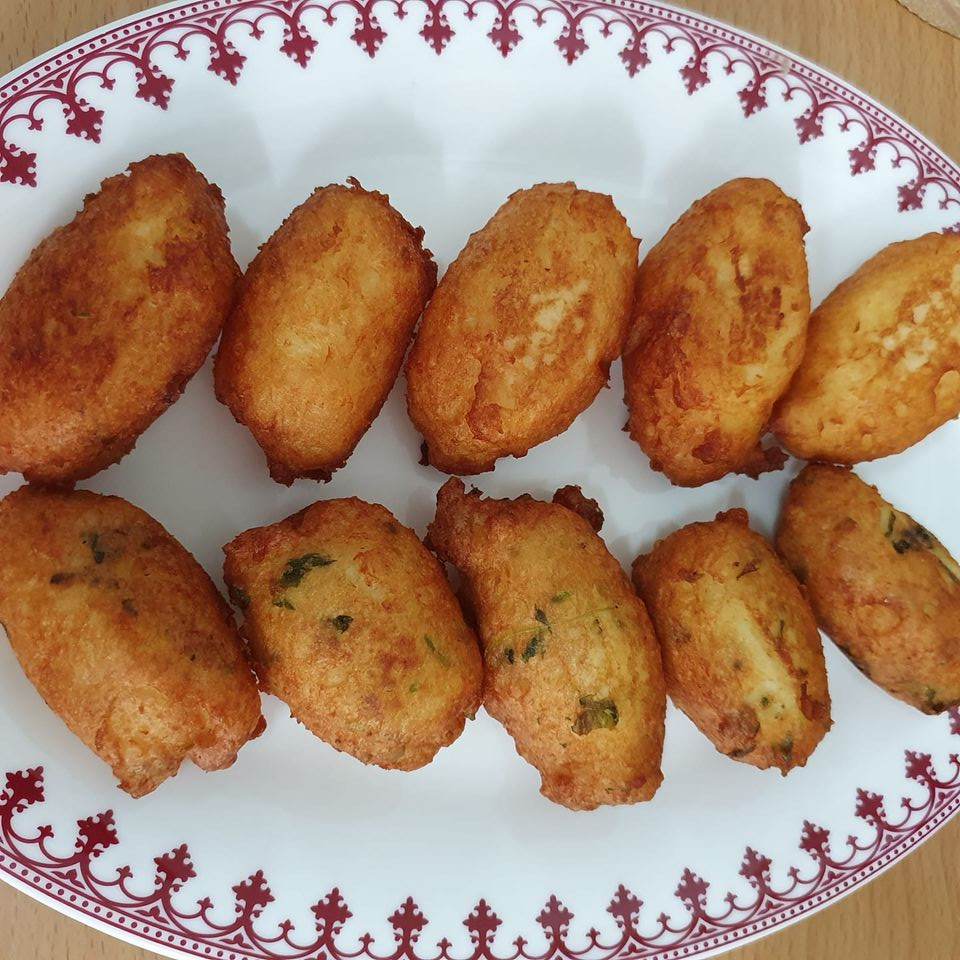
- Pommes dauphine
- Place of origin: France
- Main ingredients: Mashed potatoes, choux pastry

Pommes dauphine, sometimes called dauphine potatoes, are crisp potato puffs made by mixing mashed potatoes with savoury choux pastry, forming the mixture into quenelle shapes or rounds that are deep-fried at 170 to 180 °C (338 to 356 °F).

The dish is named for the Dauphine of France, wife of the heir apparent to the French throne.

Pommes dauphine typically accompany red meats or chicken. Typically served in restaurants, they are often for sale at supermarkets in France.

Related potato preparations include pommes noisette, pommes duchesse, croquettes, and pommes soufflées. Pommes dauphines are unique, however, with the choux pastry yielding a less dense dish.

== See also ==
- List of choux pastry dishes
