= Kok (dessert) =

Greek profiterole

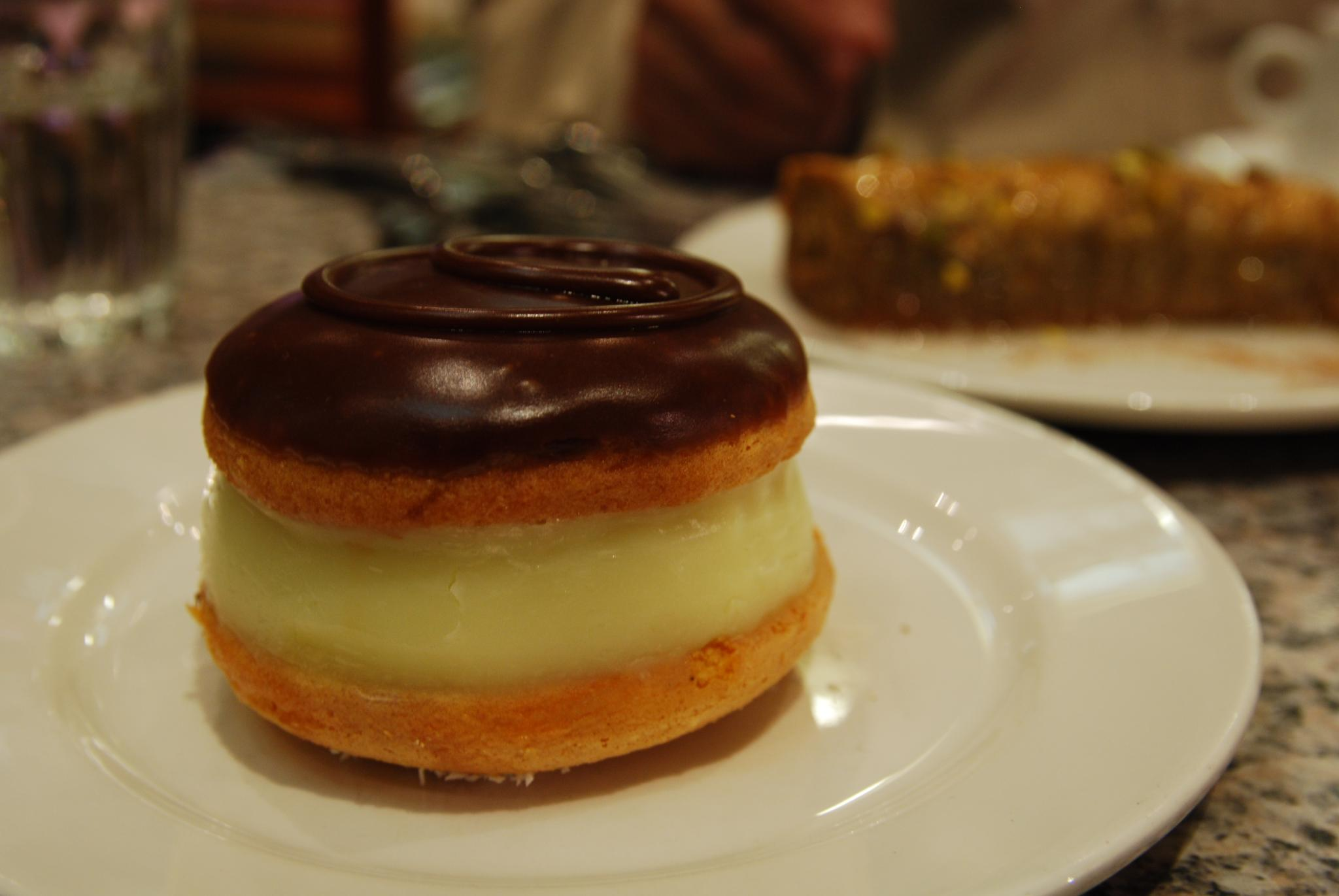
- Image of kok pastry
- Type: Dessert
- Place of origin: Greece
- Main ingredients: pastry cream, chocolate, syrup

Kok (Greek: κοκ or κωκ) or Kokakia (meaning multiple smaller kok, as they are typically served multiple) is a Greek dessert, similar to a profiterole, consisting of a sponge cake sandwich, pastry cream, chocolate glaze and syrup. It is sometimes additionally topped with nuts or flakes of various kinds.

== See also ==
- List of choux pastry dishes
- List of pastries
