= Gougère =

French savory pastry puff with cheese

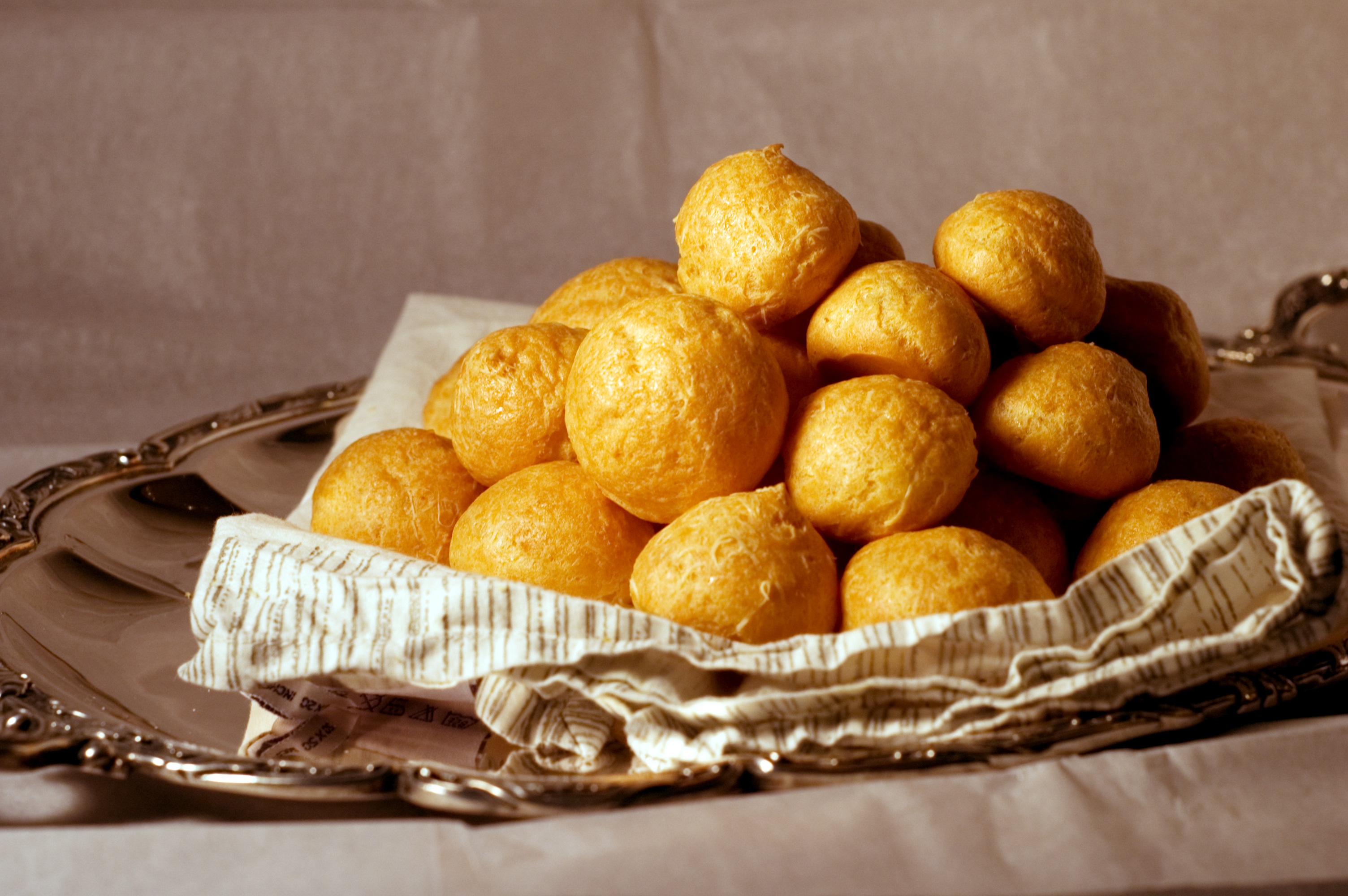
- Gruyère cheese gougères
- Type: Choux pastry
- Place of origin: France
- Main ingredients: Choux pastry, cheese (usually Gruyère, Comté, or Emmental)

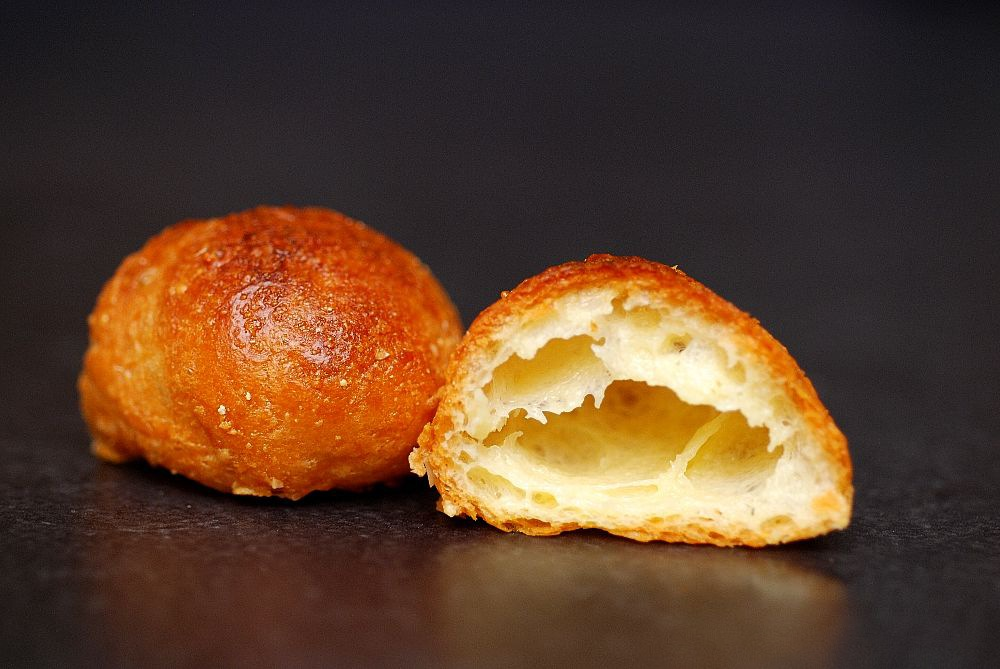
The inside of a gougère

A gougère (French: [ɡuʒɛʁ]), in French cuisine, is a baked savory choux pastry made of choux dough mixed with cheese. There are many variants. The cheese is commonly grated Gruyère, Comté, or Emmentaler, but there are many variants using other cheeses or other ingredients.

Gougères are said to come from Burgundy, particularly the town of Tonnerre in the Yonne department.

Gougères can be made as small pastries, 3–4 cm (1–1 1/2 in) in diameter; aperitif gougères, 10–12 cm (4–4 1/2 in); individual gougères; or in a ring. Sometimes they are filled with ingredients such as mushrooms, beef, or ham; in this case the gougère is usually made using a ring or pie tin.

In Burgundy, they are generally served cold when tasting wine in cellars, but are also served warm as an appetizer.

== History ==
While the term currently refers specifically to savory choux pastries, eighteenth and nineteenth century records suggest that it was once an umbrella term for a number of preparations, some composed of just cheese, eggs, and breadcrumbs. The presentation was usually a flat disk, neither a sphere nor a ring.

Earlier forms of gougère were more a stew than a pastry, including herbs, bacon, eggs, cheese, spices, and meat mixed with an animal's blood, and prepared in a sheep's stomach. In medieval France, it was a kind of cheese tart or pie. Later, it was unknown outside what is now Belgium, where it became associated with Palm Sunday. But it was also attested in Auxerre (Burgundy) in the 19th century under the name gouere.

== Name ==
The word gougère was formerly spelled gouiere, gouyere, goïère, goyère, or gouyère. The modern spelling appears to date from the 18th century.

The ultimate origin of the word is unknown.

== See also ==
- Pão de queijo
- List of choux pastry dishes
