= Religieuse =

Cream-filled choux pastry dessert

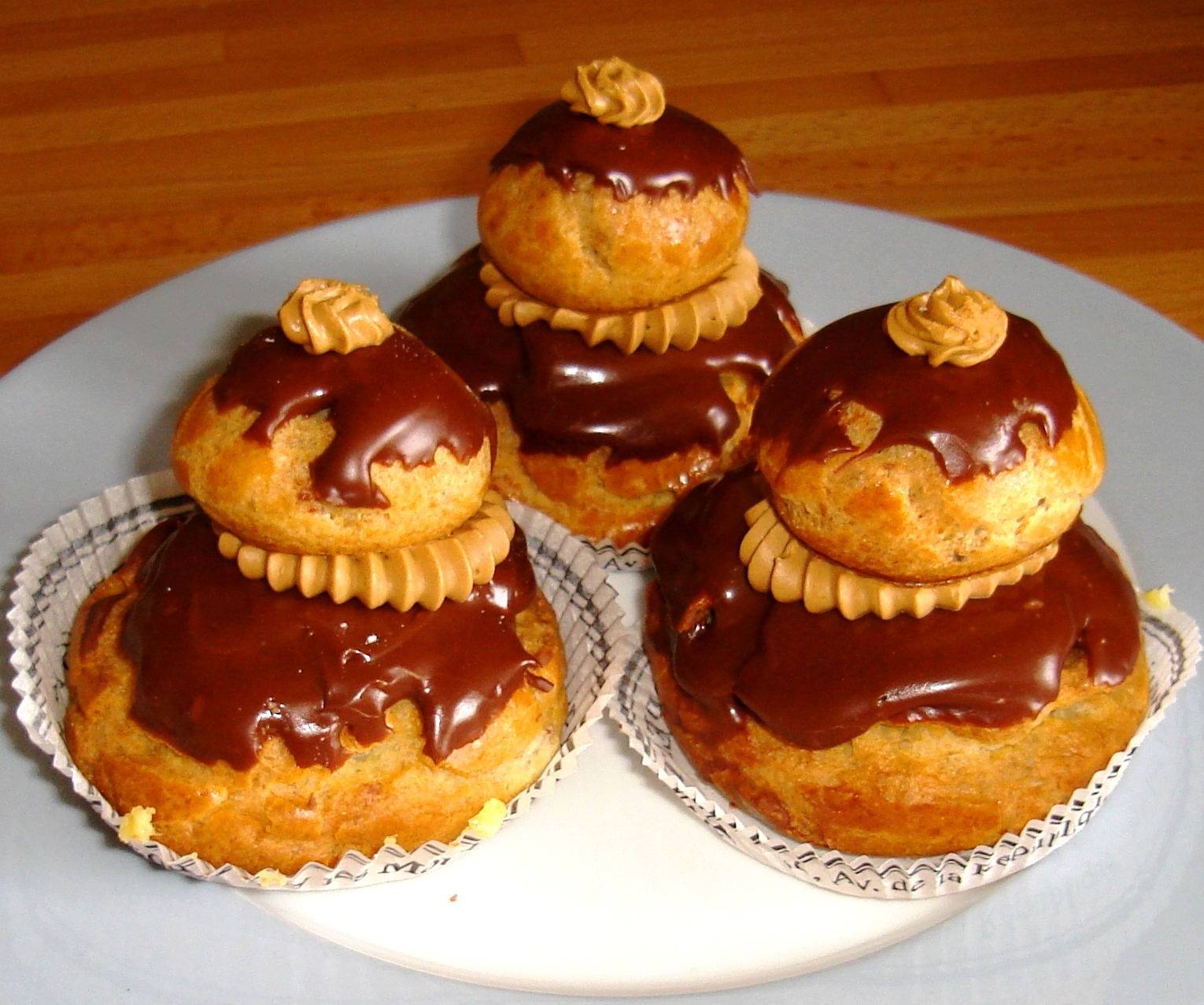
- Religieuses au chocolat
- Course: Dessert
- Place of origin: France
- Main ingredients: Flour and crème pâtissière

A religieuse (French pronunciation: [ʁəliʒjøz]) is a French dessert made of a small choux pastry case stacked on top of a larger one, both filled with crème pâtissière, commonly flavoured with chocolate or mocha. Each case is topped with a ganache of the same flavour as the filling, then attached to each other using piped buttercream icing. It is a type of éclair.

The dessert, whose name means "nun", is supposed to represent the papal mitre. The religieuse was supposedly conceived in the mid-nineteenth century; choux pastry was invented in the 16th century.

A derivation called courtesan au chocolat, filled with chocolate custard and with the glazing coloured pink, lavender and pale green, was invented for Wes Anderson’s 2014 film The Grand Budapest Hotel, commissioned to Anemone Müller of Cafe CaRe, a local baker of Görlitz, where the film was shot.

== See also ==
- List of choux pastry dishes
- List of French desserts
