= Chouquette =

Petits fours originating in France

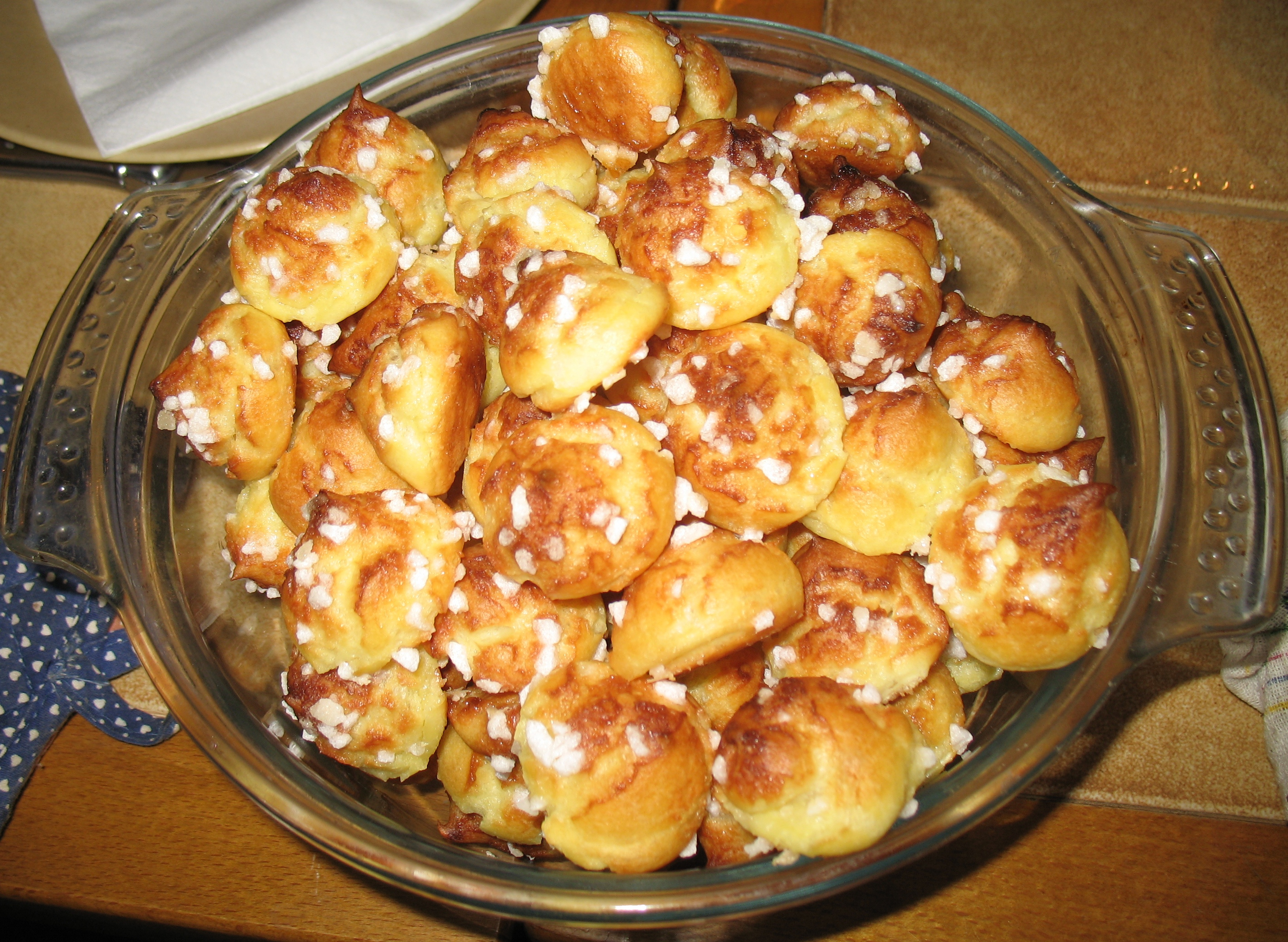
- Alternative names: Petits choux
- Course: Petits fours
- Place of origin: France
- Serving temperature: Hot or cold
- Main ingredients: Choux pastry, sugar

Chouquettes (French: [ʃukɛt]) or petits choux are small pieces of French patisserie consisting of small spheres of choux pastry, sugared and baked. The term was known in the 16th century, and was originally applied to small savoury spheres. Since the late 17th century chouquettes have been sweet.

== History ==
In The Oxford Companion to Food, Alan Davidson writes that the term is of long standing: "A street cry in the 16th century was 'Choux, petits choux, tout chauds' [all hot]." According to Le Thresor de santé (The Treasury of Health), published by Jean-Antoine Huguetan in 1607:

The petits choux of Paris are made by mixing a fat cheese and soft wheat with a few eggs, to which flour is added so that the mixture is firm. It is beaten well and then made into large or small round shapes, like an apple, and put in the oven. When they are half cooked, make slashes in the form of a cross on their tops and put them back in the oven until they are cooked.

Randle Cotgrave's A Dictionarie of the French and English Tongues (1611) gives the name of the item as "tichous" – "Little cakes made of egges and flower with a little butter (and sometimes cheese among) eaten ordinarily with sugar and Rosewater." Davidson notes that Antoine Furetière's Dictionnaire universel (1690) describes "something closer to the modern petits choux, without cheese".

Davidson describes chouquettes as among the most popular Parisian friandises – "eaten at tea when warm and soft, semi-dry at other times". Wedding cakes are sometimes constructed from them, in the manner of a croquembouche, with crème pâtissière inside.

== Bibliography ==
- Cotgrave, Randle (1611). A Dictionarie of the French and English Tongues. London: A. Islip. OCLC 1044380136.
- Davidson, Alan (1999). The Oxford Companion to Food. Oxford: Oxford University Press. ISBN 978-0-19-211579-9.
- Huguetan, Jean-Antoine (1607). Le Thresor de santé. Lyon: Huguetan. OCLC 1349588711.
