= Choux pastry =

Type of pastry dough

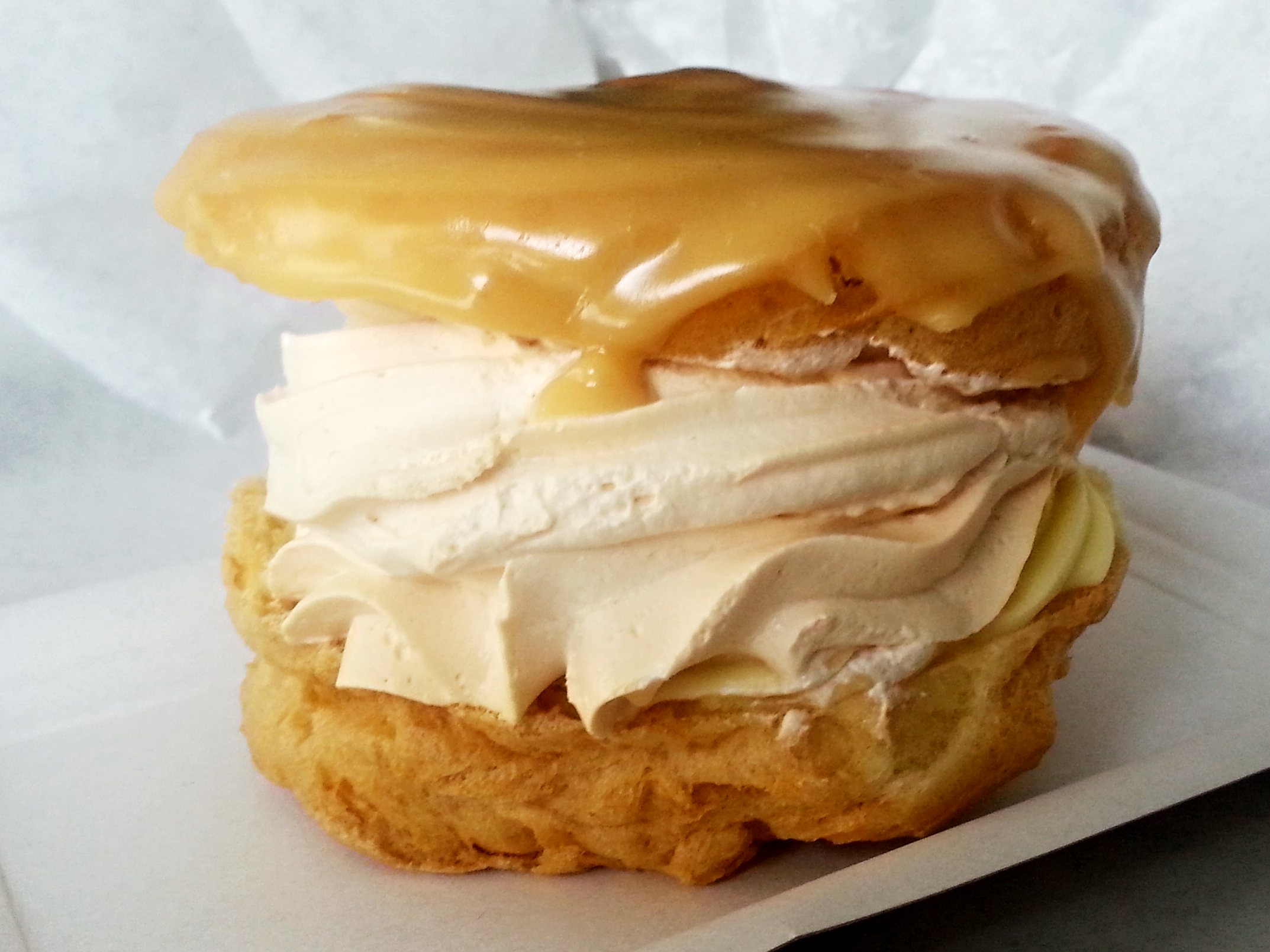
- A cake made from choux pastry and filled with cream.
- Alternative names: Pâte à choux
- Type: Pastry
- Place of origin: France
- Main ingredients: Butter, flour, eggs, water

Choux pastry, or pâte à choux (French: [pat a ʃu]), is a delicate pastry dough used in many pastries. The essential ingredients are butter, water, flour and eggs.

Instead of a raising agent, choux pastry employs its high moisture content to create steam as the water in the dough evaporates when baked, puffing the pastry. The pastry is used in many European cuisines, including French and Spanish, and can be used to make many goods such as eclairs, Paris-Brest, cream puffs, profiteroles, crullers, beignets, churros and funnel cakes.

== History ==
The full term is commonly said to be a corruption of French pâte à chaud (lit. 'hot pastry/dough'). The term "choux" has two meanings in the early literature. One is a kind of cheese puff, first documented in the 13th century; the other corresponds to the modern choux pastry and is documented in English, German, and French cookbooks in the 16th century. This dough was sometimes baked, sometimes fried. Choux pastry is later widely documented in the 18th century, under names including Pate a la Royale or Paste Royal.

Popelins were common aristocratic desserts in the 16th century, and were flavored with cheese or citrus (for example lemon peel, orange blossom water, etc.). They were prepared from dough that had been dried over a fire to evaporate its water, which was called pâte à chaud.

The royal chefs Jean Avice, a pâtissier, and Antoine Carême, who worked in the court of Marie Antoinette, made modifications to the recipe in the 18th century, resulting in the recipe most commonly used now for profiteroles.

The name pouplin (lit. 'baby, small child'), later popelin or poupelin, is attested in around 1349 for a kind of cake made with flour and eggs.

A widely repeated story claims that choux pastry was invented in 1540 by a Pantanelli and a Popelini (neither of whom is ever cited with a first name), supposedly the pastry chefs of Queen Catherine de' Medici, the Italian wife of King Henry II of France. This is part of the fiction that Italian cuisine was introduced to France by her retinue, apparently first mentioned in the 18th century. Pantenelli supposedly invented the dough in 1540, seven years after the arrival of Catherine in France. He is said to have used the dough to make a gâteau named pâte à Pantanelli. Over time, the recipe of the dough evolved, and the name changed to pâte à popelin, which was used to make popelins, named after Pantanelli's successor Popelini. However, the story of Popelini, also called Popelin, only appears in the beginning of the 1890s in the writings of the French pastry chef Pierre Lacam. The story is clearly fictional given that poupelins are attested long before the 16th century, with the name Popelini being created from the word popelin and not the other way around; similarly, Pantarelli appears to be derived from pâte.

== Essential ingredients and manner of rising ==
The ingredients for choux pastry are butter, water, flour and eggs. Like Yorkshire pudding or David Eyre's pancake, instead of a raising agent, it employs high moisture content to create steam during cooking to puff the pastry. The high moisture content is achieved by boiling the water and butter, then adding the flour. The mixture is cooked a few minutes longer, then cooled before adding enough eggs to achieve the desired consistency. The boiling step causes the starch in the flour to gel, allowing the incorporation of more water.

== Foods made with choux pastry ==
This pastry is used to make choux (small puffs), as the name implies, but also profiteroles, croquembouches, éclairs, religieuses, French crullers, beignets, and gâteau St-Honoré.

It's used in savory recipes also like Parisian gnocchi, dumplings, chouquettes (unfilled choux pastry paired with pearl sugar), pommes dauphine and gougères.

Choux pastry is usually baked, but for beignets, it is fried. In Spain and Latin America, churros are made of fried choux pastry, sugared and dipped in a thick hot chocolate for breakfast. In Italian cuisine, choux pastry is the base for zeppole di San Giuseppe, which are cream-filled pastries eaten on March 19 for the feast of Saint Joseph. In Austrian cuisine, one variation of Marillenknödel, a sweet apricot dumpling cooked in simmering water, uses choux pastry; in that case it does not puff, but remains relatively dense. Choux pastries are sometimes filled with cream after baking to make cream puffs or éclairs.

A craquelin is covered in a "crackly" sugar topping — and often filled with pastry cream, much like an éclair.

== Chouquette ==
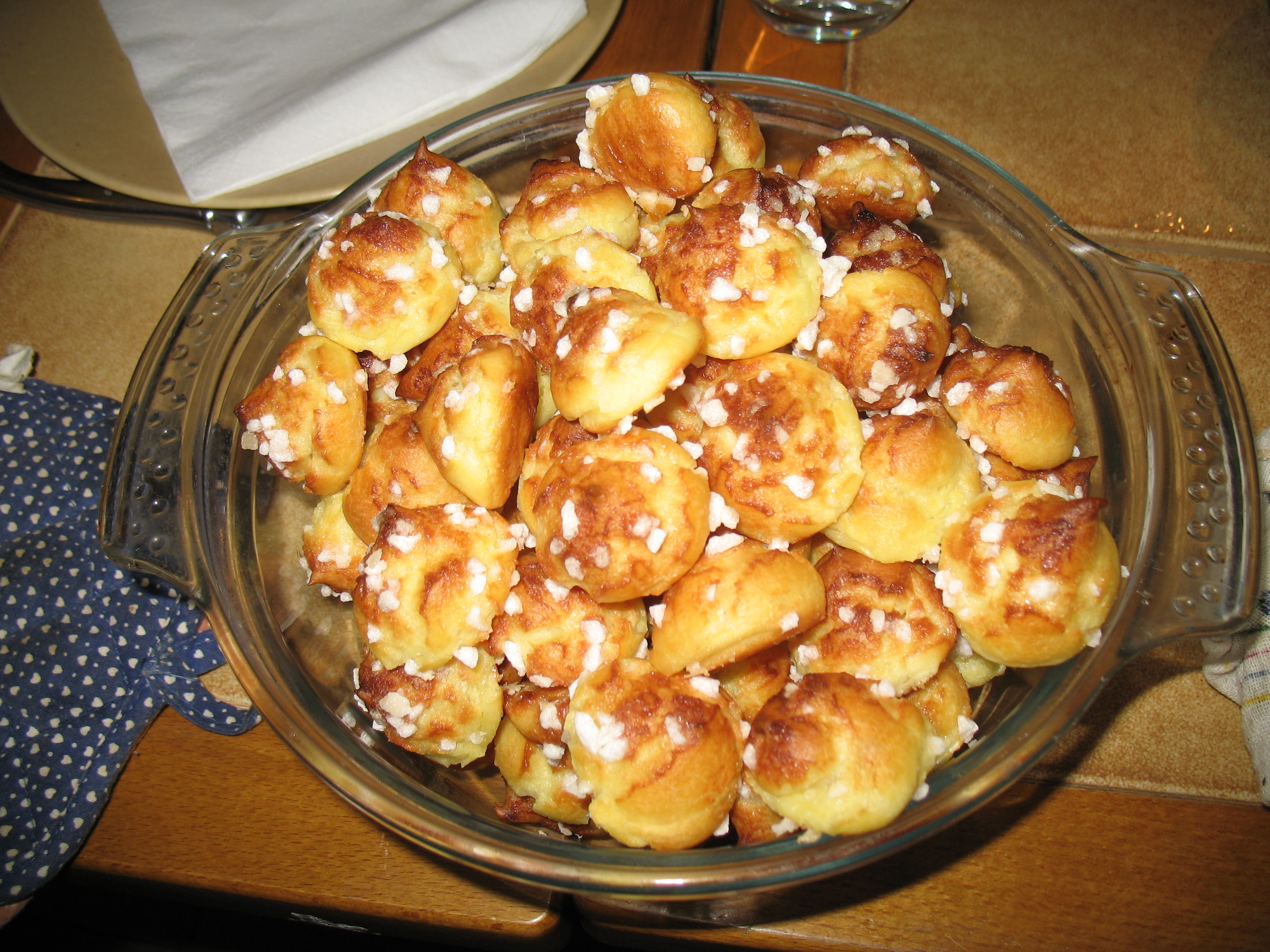
Chouquette

A chouquette (French: [ʃukɛt]), a diminutive of choux, is a small, round, hollow choux pastry covered with pearl sugar. Unlike éclairs, which are also made with choux pastry, chouquettes are bite-sized and the hollow inside is not filled.

Chouquettes originate from Paris, France, and can be enjoyed at anytime of the day, typically for breakfast or as an afternoon snack.

== Gallery ==
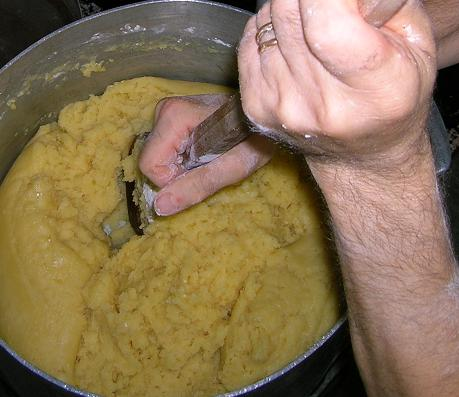
Mixing choux pastry dough for beignets

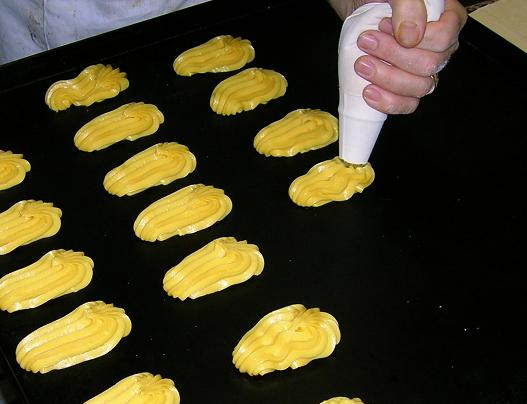
Piping out the dough for beignets with a pastry bag

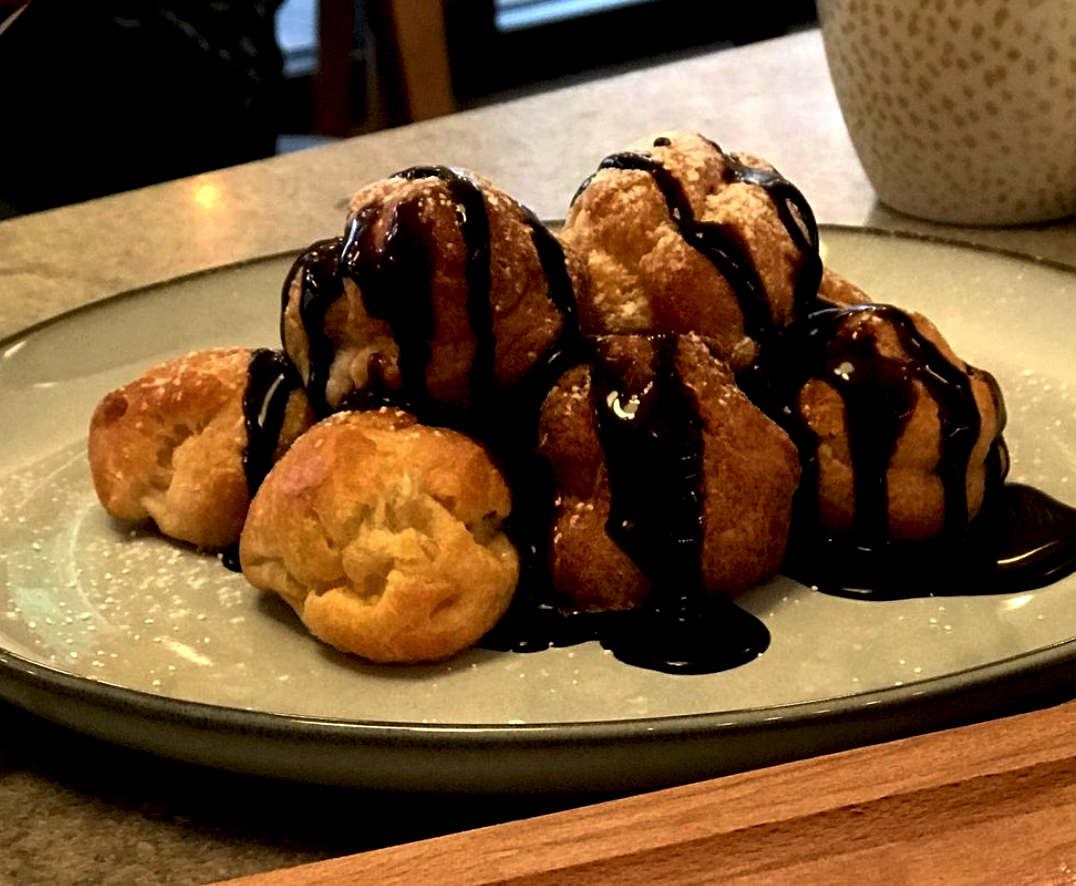
Classic Profiteroles serving, with chocolate sauce

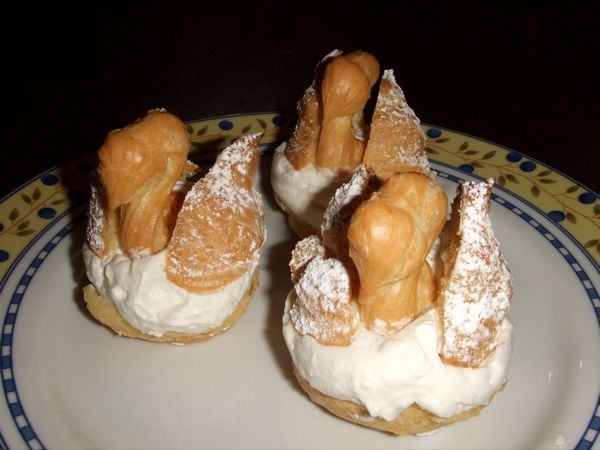
Choux pastry swans

== See also ==
The dictionary definition of pâte à choux at Wiktionary

- Kitchener bun
- Profiterole
- Choux à la crème
- Éclair
- List of choux pastry dishes
