= Chiboust cream =

Pastry cream lightened with meringue

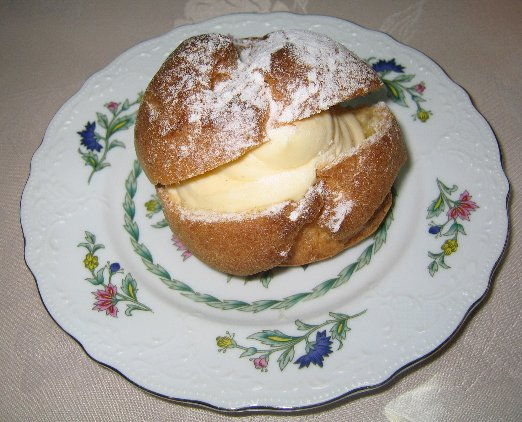
- Chiboust cream puff
- Alternative names: Crème chiboust
- Type: Custard
- Place of origin: France
- Main ingredients: crème pâtissière, meringue

Crème chiboust is a crème pâtissière (pastry cream) lightened with meringue, though whipped cream is sometimes substituted for the meringue. It is the filling for the gâteau St-Honoré, supposedly created and developed in 1847 by the pastry chef M. Chiboust of the pastry shop that was located on the Paris street Rue Saint-Honoré. It is sometimes called "Crème Saint Honoré".

The recipe given by Jules Gouffé in Le Livre De Patisserie begins by gradually adding flour and milk to egg yolks, heating the custard mixture, and gently folding in meringue.

Crème chiboust can be flavoured with vanilla, orange zest, or liqueurs.

== See also ==
- St. Honoré Cake
