= Dutch baby pancake =

Pancake originating from the United States

Dutch baby
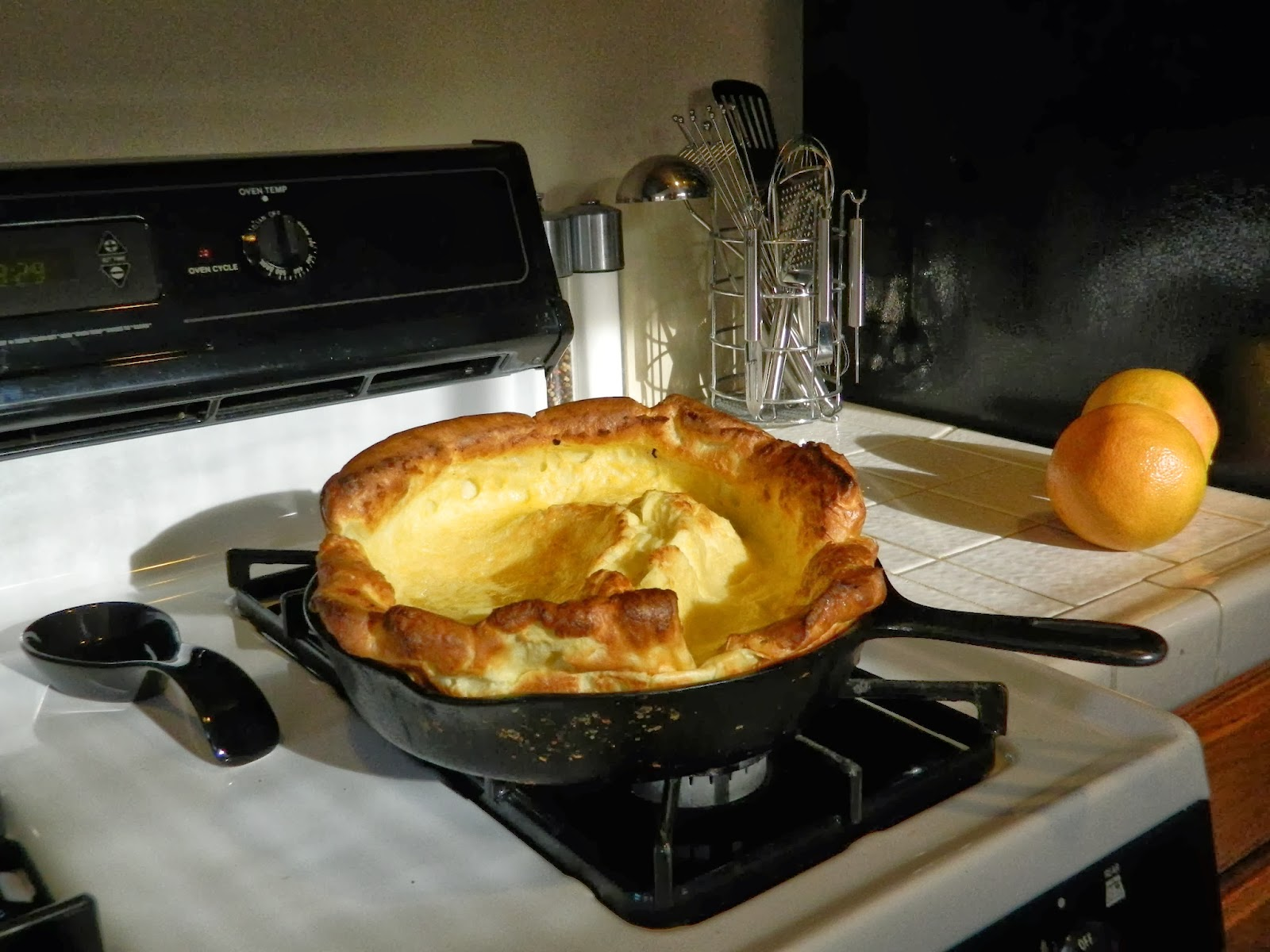
- Dutch baby pancake fresh out of the oven
- Alternative names: German pancake, Bismarck, Dutch puff
- Type: Popover
- Place of origin: United States
- Region or state: Washington
- Main ingredients: Eggs, wheat flour, milk, vanilla, cinnamon

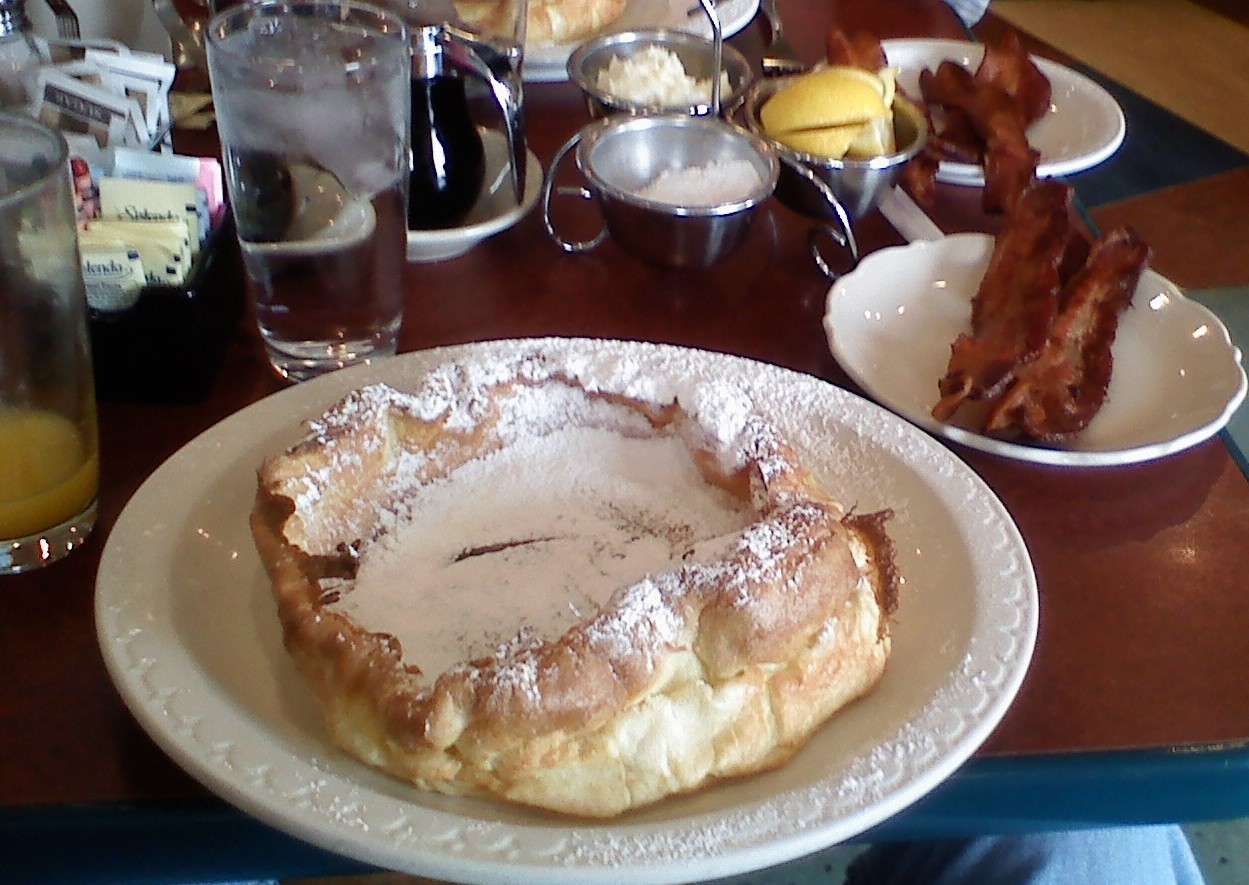
A Dutch baby with powdered sugar

A Dutch baby pancake, sometimes called a German pancake, a Bismarck, a Dutch puff, hooligan, or a hootenanny, is a dish that is similar to a large Yorkshire pudding.

Unlike most pancakes, Dutch babies are baked in the oven, rather than being fried. They are generally thicker than most pancakes and contain no chemical leavening ingredients such as baking powder. Despite the name, they are not small, nor do they originate in the Netherlands.

They can be sweet or savory and can be served at any meal.

The idea of a Dutch baby pancake may have been derived from the German Pfannkuchen, but the current form originated in the United States in the early 1900s.

== Ingredients and preparation ==
It is made with eggs, flour, sugar and milk, and usually seasoned with vanilla and cinnamon, although occasionally fruit or another flavoring is also added. A basic batter incorporates a third of a cup of flour and a third of a cup of milk per two eggs.

It is baked in a hot cast iron or metal pan and falls (deflates) soon after being removed from the oven. It is generally served with freshly squeezed lemon, butter, and powdered sugar, fruit toppings or syrup.

== Serving ==
It can be served for breakfast, brunch, lunch, dessert, and even for "brinner" (breakfast for dinner). Dutch baby pancakes are generally served immediately upon removal from the oven.

The Dutch baby is a specialty of some diners and chains that specialize in breakfast dishes, such as the Oregon-founded The Original Pancake House or the New England–based chain Bickford's, which makes both a plain Dutch baby and a similar pancake known as the Baby Apple, which contains apple slices embedded in the pancake.

== History ==
According to Sunset magazine, Dutch babies were introduced in the first half of the 1900s at Manca's Cafe, a family-run restaurant that was located in Seattle, Washington, and that was owned by Victor Manca. While these pancakes are derived from the German pancake dish, it is said that the name Dutch baby was coined by one of Victor Manca's daughters, where "Dutch" perhaps was her corruption of the German autonym deutsch. Manca's Cafe claimed that it owned the trademark for Dutch babies in 1942.

== Similar dishes ==
A Dutch baby is a type of popover, although popovers are generally baked as smaller, individual pieces, approximately the size of a muffin.

A Dutch baby is very similar to a Yorkshire pudding, with a few differences: the Yorkshire pudding is more likely to be baked in individual servings, the pan is usually greased with beef drippings, and the result is rarely sweet. Dutch babies are larger, use butter rather than beef fat, and are frequently sweet. They use more eggs than a Yorkshire pudding and normally have sugar and vanilla and, unlike a Yorkshire pudding, are normally cooked in a cast-iron frying pan.

=== David Eyre's pancake ===
David Eyre's pancake
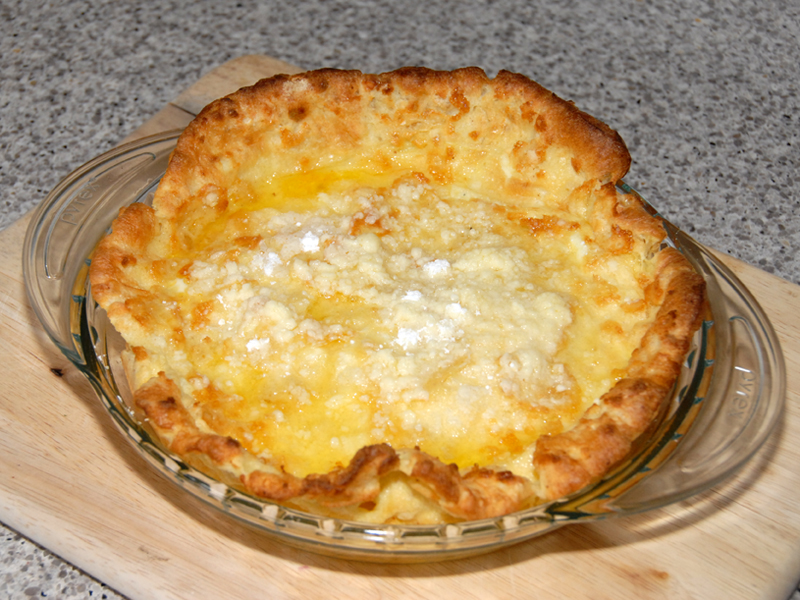
- Type: Pancake
- Main ingredients: Eggs, milk, flour, nutmeg

A "David Eyre's pancake" is a variation on the Dutch baby pancake named after the American writer and editor David W. Eyre (1912–2008). The recipe was published by The New York Times Food Editor Craig Claiborne in an April 10, 1966 article entitled "Pancake Nonpareil"; in addition to generally regularizing quantities and temperatures for modern use, it omitted sugar and salt from the batter. In the article, Claiborne recounted discovering the dish at a breakfast prepared by Eyre, then the editor of Honolulu magazine, while Claiborne was visiting Eyre's Honolulu home.

Eyre's version of the pancake was based on a recipe for Dutch baby pancakes from Victor Hirtzler's Hotel St. Francis Cookbook—the best-known 1919 edition—with slight alteration.

The recipe also appears in The Essential New York Times Cookbook, whose author, longtime food writer Amanda Hesser, counts it among her favorites. She names it as one of the top five recipes recommended to her for inclusion when she set out to write the book.

== See also ==
- Æbleskiver, a Danish pancake
- List of pancakes
- Poffertjes – Traditional Dutch batter treat
- Flaugnarde – French dessert
- Clafoutis – French dessert or breakfast dish containing cherries
- Far Breton – Dessert cake from Brittany, France
