= List of French dishes =

There are many dishes considered part of French cuisine. Some dishes are considered universally accepted as part of the national cuisine, while others fit into a unique regional cuisine. There are also breads, charcuterie items as well as desserts that fit into these categories which are listed accordingly as well.

== Common dishes found on a national level ==
There are many dishes that are considered part of the French national cuisine today. Many come from haute cuisine in the fine-dining realm, but others are regional dishes that have become a norm across the country. Below are lists of a few of the more common dishes available in France on a national level.

- Chicken Marengo
- Hachis Parmentier
- Jambon-beurre
- Poulet chasseur

=== Common bread ===
Baguette

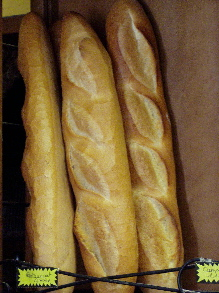
Flûtes

- Ficelle – a thin baguette
- Baguette - a ‘wand’
- Flûte – a thicker baguette
- Boule – a 'ball'
- Pain de campagne
- Pain de mie

=== Viennoiseries ===
- Chausson aux pommes
- Croissant
- Pain au chocolat
- Pain aux raisins
- Pain suisse
- Pain viennois

=== Common desserts and pastries ===
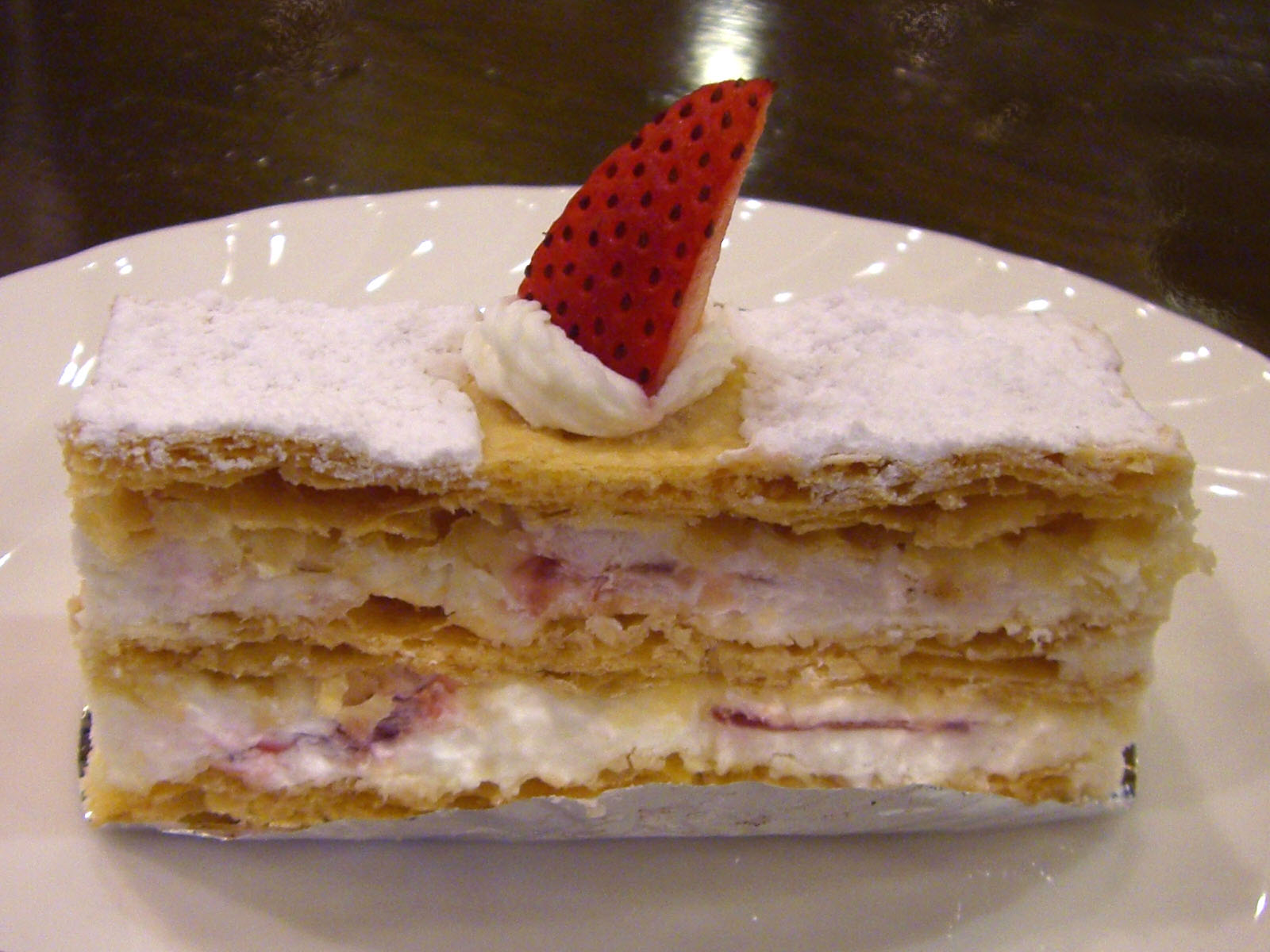
A mille-feuille pastry

- Brioche
- Bûche de Noël
- Café liégeois
- Chouquette
- Crème brûlée
- Croquembouche
- Croustade aux pommes
- Éclair
- Far Breton
- Fraisier
- Galette des rois
- Gateau au yaourt
- Macarons
- Madeleine
- Mille-feuilles
- Mousse au chocolat
- Pain perdu
- Quatre-quarts
- Saint Honoré
- Soufflé

== Ardennes ==
- Cacasse à cul nu (potatoes, onions, and often bacon or sausage, cooked in a Dutch oven)

== Lorraine ==
- Baba au rhum
- Bouchée à la reine (shell puff pastry with cream sauce and chicken)
- Crepe et fruit
- Fuseau lorrain (literally "Lorraine spindle" – a smoked sausage, served cold as a charcuterie item)
- Glace Plombières
- Macarons de Nancy
- Madeleine (small traditional cake from Commercy made with orange blossom)
- Pâté lorrain
- Potée Lorraine
- Quiche Lorraine (traditional tart with bacon, eggs and cheese)
- Tarte à la brimbelle (myrtille)
- Tarte aux mirabelles
- Tête de veau
- Tourte

== Alsace ==
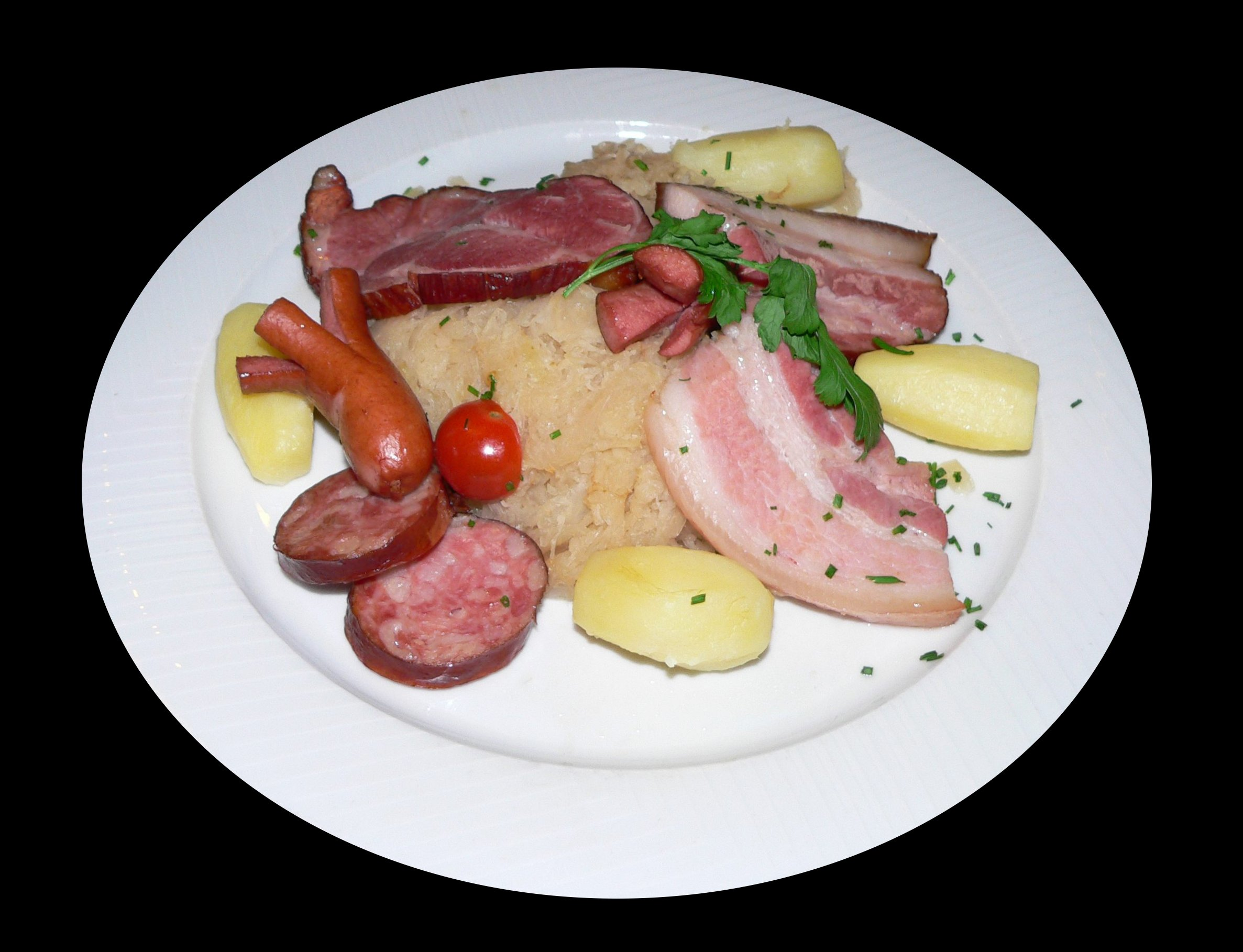
A typical choucroute garnie

- Baeckeoffe
- Carpe frites
- Choucroute garnie (sauerkraut with sausages, salt pork and potatoes)
- Coq au Riesling (the local Alsace variant of coq au vin)
- Knack / Saucisse de Strasbourg
- Kouglof (traditional brioche cake with almonds baked in a special bell shaped mould)
- Presskopf
- Rosbif à l'alsacienne (horsemeat)
- Spätzle
- Tarte à l'oignon or Zewelwaï
- Tarte flambée / Flammekueche

== Normandy ==
- Matelote (fish, stewed in cider or wine, and either red wine or white wine, or occasionally Champagne, are appropriate for use)
- Moules à la crème Normande (mussels cooked with white wine, Normandy cider, garlic and cream)
- Tarte Normande (apple custard tart)
- Teurgoule (a baked rice dessert)
- Tripes à la mode de Caen (tripe cooked in cider and calvados)
- Poulet au cidre et aux carottes de Créances (spicy chicken in cider with carrots)

== Sud-Ouest (Bordeaux, Périgord, Gascony and Basque country) ==
- Axoa
- Confit de canard
- Foie gras
- Garbure
- Magret de canard
- Piperade

== Poitou-Charentes and Limousin ==
- Farcidure
- Flaugnarde
- Fondu creusois
- Pâté aux pommes de terre
- Tourtous aux rillettes d'oie

== Brittany ==
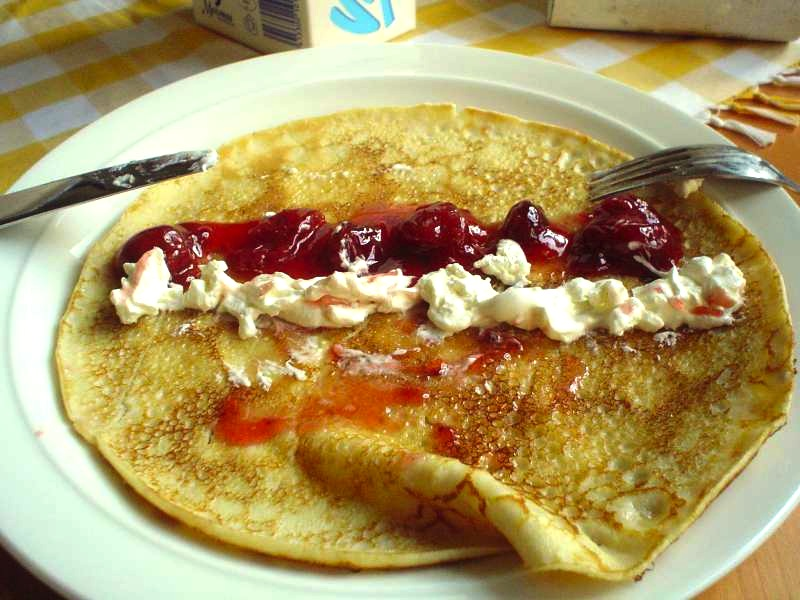
A sweet crêpe

- Crêpes (a very thin type of pancake, often eaten filled with sweet or savory fillings)
- Far Breton (flan with prunes)
- Kig ha farz (boiled pork dinner with buckwheat dumplings)
- Kouign amann (galette made flaky with high proportion of butter)
- Haricots a la Bretonne (beans, Bretton style)
- Poulet à la bretonne (chicken simmered in apple cider)

== Loire Valley/Central France ==
- Andouillettes (sausage made with chitterlings)
- Rillettes (spreadable paste made from braised meat and rendered fat, similar to pâté)
- Gratin de blettes (spinach beet gratin)

== Burgundy and Franche-Comté ==
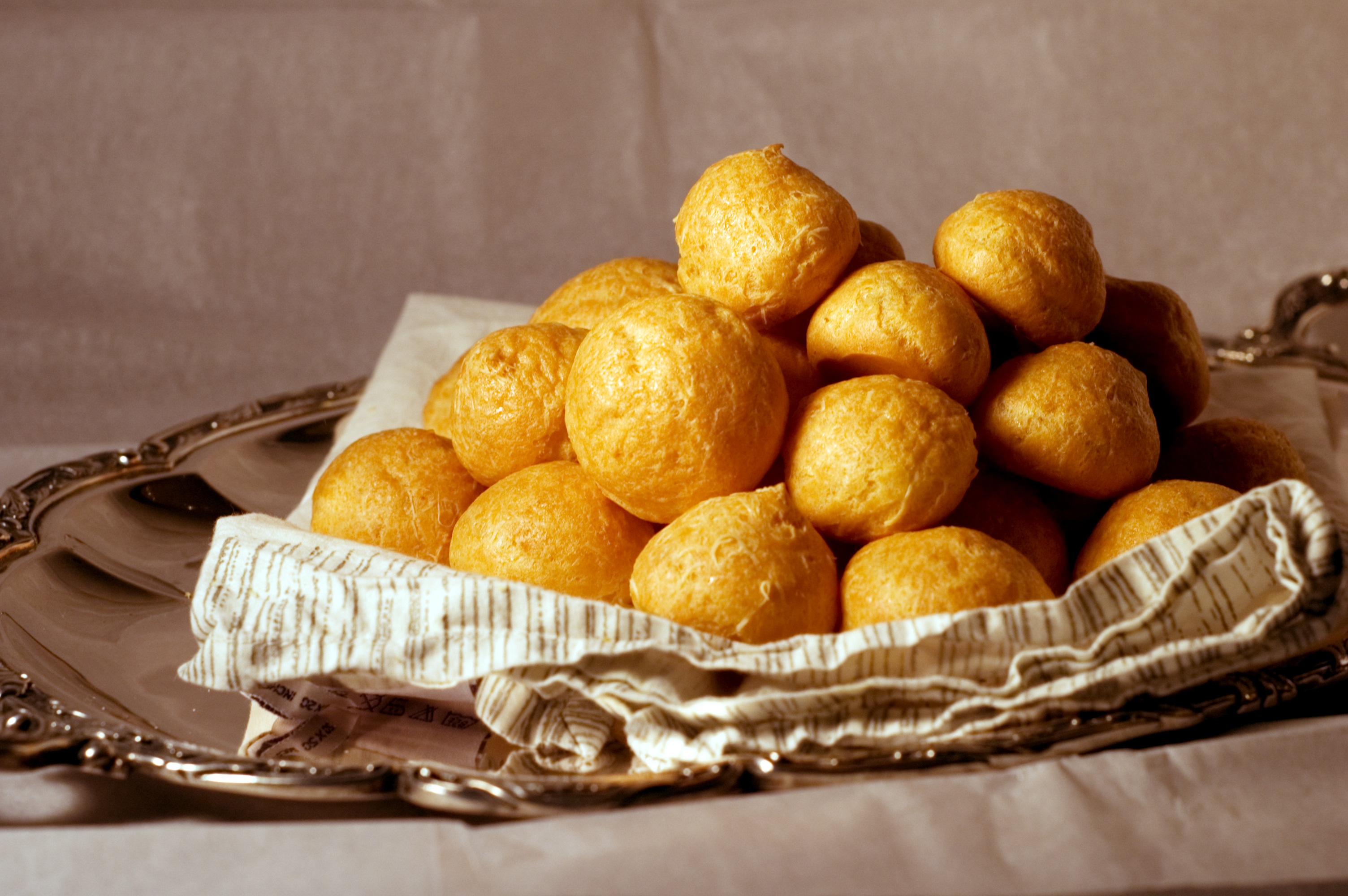
Gruyère Cheese Gougères

- Bœuf bourguignon (beef stewed in red wine)
- Coq au vin (chicken braised in red wine, lardons and mushrooms)
- Escargots de Bourgogne (snails baked in their shells with parsley butter)
- Gougère (cheese in choux pastry)
- Jambon persillé, also known as Jambon de Pâques (a marbled ham with parsley)
- Oeufs en meurette (poached eggs in a red wine and pepper reduction sauce)
- Pôchouse (pauchouse; fish stewed in red wine)
- Gaston Gérard Chicken (chicken in a creamy mustard, wine, and cheese sauce)

== Auvergne-Rhône-Alpes ==
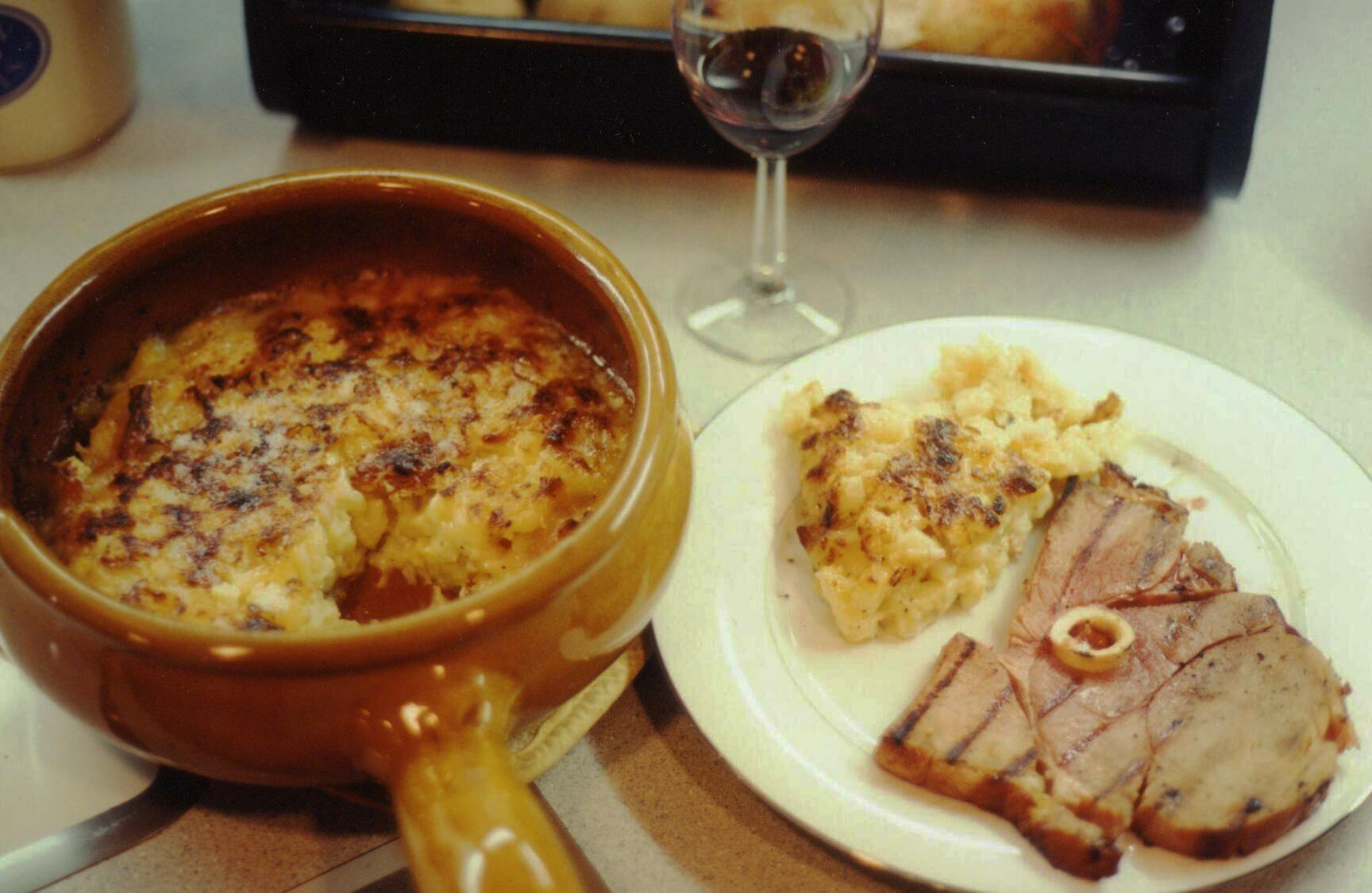
Tartiflette with ham

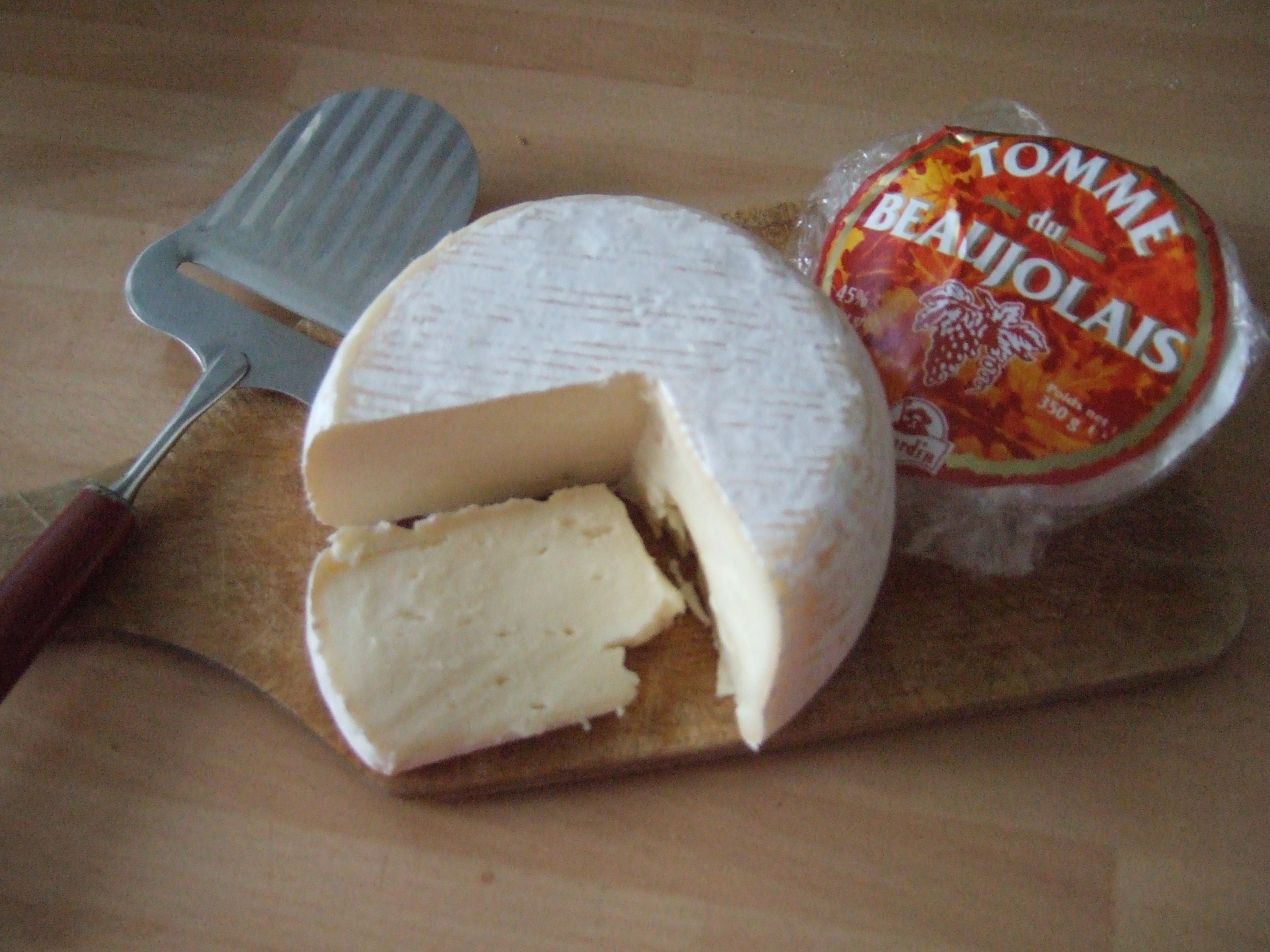
Tomme cheese

- Andouillette (a kind of sausage with tripe)
- Fondue savoyarde (fondue made with cheese and white wine into which cubes of bread are dipped)
- Gratin dauphinois (a traditional regional French dish based on potatoes and crème fraîche)
- Quenelle (flour, butter, eggs, milk and fish, traditionally pike, mixed and poached)
- Raclette (the cheese is melted and served with potatoes, ham and often dried beef)
- Soupe à l'oignon (onion soup based on meat stock, often served gratinéed with cheese on top)
- Tartiflette (a Savoyard gratin with potatoes, Reblochon cheese, cream and pork)
- Gratin de crozets savoyard (a Savoyard dish with square buckwheat pasta called "crozets de Savoie", cheese and ham)

== Aveyron/Cantal ==
- Aligot (mashed potatoes blended with young Tomme cheese)
- Tripoux (tripe 'parcels' in a savoury sauce)
- Pansette de Gerzat (lamb tripe stewed in wine, shallots and blue cheese)
- Salade Aveyronaise (lettuce, tomato, roquefort cheese, walnuts)
- Truffade (potatoes sautéed with garlic and young Tomme cheese)
- Fouace (orange blossom water cake)
- Flaune (crust pastry dough filled with a mixture of eggs, sugar and orange blossom water, it looks like cheesecake)
- Farçous (savoury fritter made with Swiss chard, minced pork, parsley, eggs and flour)
- Soupe au fromage (soup with onions, garlic, cabbage, vine, stale bread, salt and pepper)
- Pascade (salted pancake)

== Languedoc-Roussillon ==
- Bourride (white fish stewed with vegetables and wine, garnished with aïoli)
- Brandade de morue (puréed salt cod)
- Cargolade (Catalan style of escargot)
- Cassoulet (a rich stew made with beans, sausages and preserved duck or goose)
- Clapassade (lamb ragout with olives, honey and licorice)
- Encornets farcis (cuttlefish stuffed with sausage meat, herbs)
- Rouille de seiche (squid prepared in a similar way to bourride)
- Trinxat (Catalan cabbage and potatoes)

== Provence-Alpes-Côte d'Azur ==
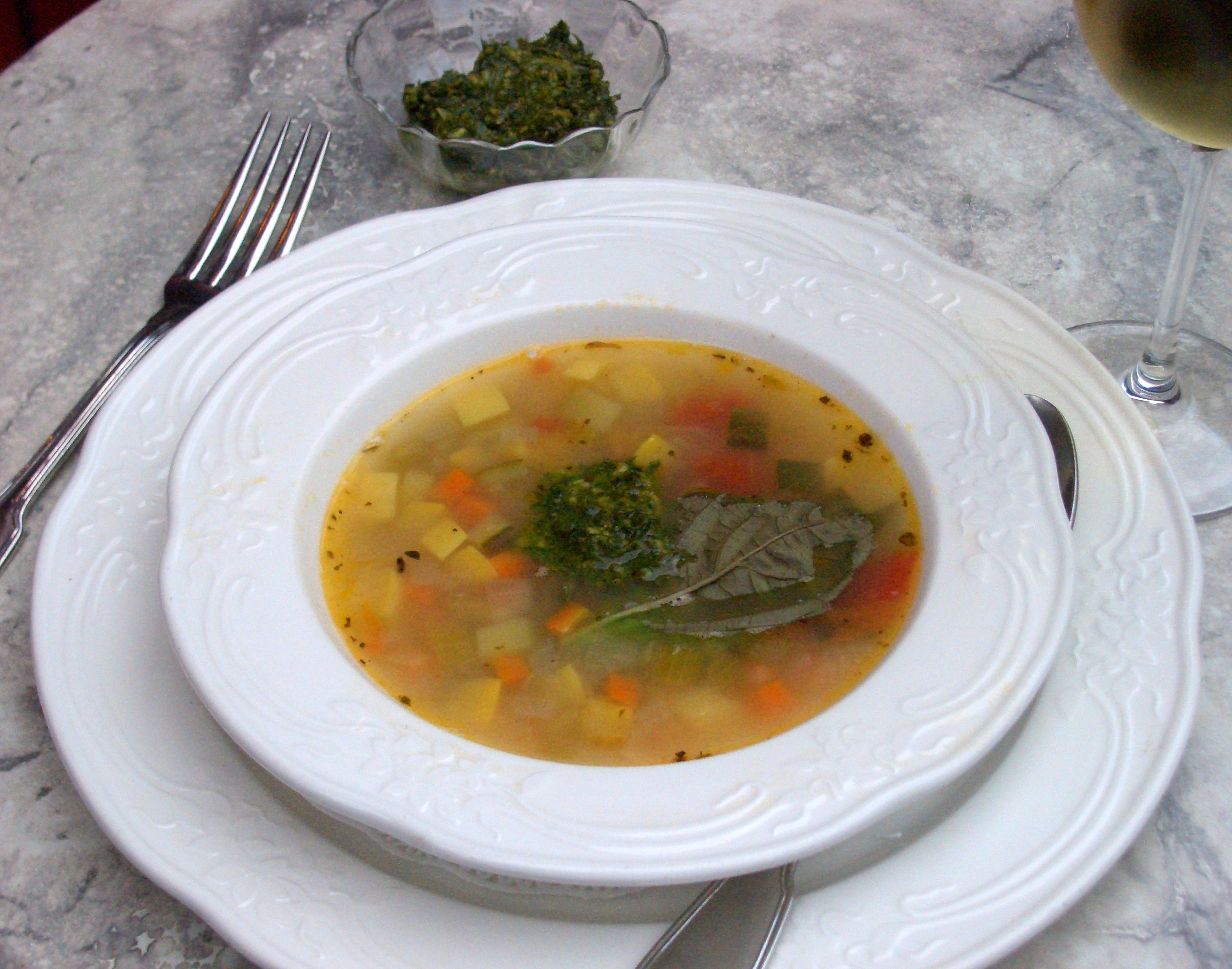
Soupe au Pistou

- Aïoli (sauce made of garlic, olive oil, lemon juice, and egg yolks)
- Bouillabaisse (a stew of mixed Mediterranean fish, tomatoes, and herbs)
- Calisson (famous candy from Aix-en-Provence)
- Chichi (French churro from Marseille)
- Daube provençale (a braised stew of beef, vegetables, garlic, and wine)
- Fougasse (a type of bread, often found with additions such as olives, cheese, or anchovies)
- Gateau des rois (tortell, provençal variant of the king cake with glazed fruit)
- Gibassier (galette made with olive oil and spiced with anise, candied orange peel, and orange flower water, and dusted with baker's sugar)
- Navette (from Marseille)
- Oreilette (beignet eaten during carnival or Christmas)
- Pan-bagnat (sandwich with whole wheat bread, salade, hard boiled eggs, tomatoes, tuna or anchovies and olive oil)
- Panisses
- Pieds paquets (lambs' feet and tripe 'parcels' in a savoury sauce)
- Pissaladière (an antecedent of the much more popular pizza)
- Pompe à l'huile, also called "Fouace" in Occitan (galette made with olive oil; one of the thirteen desserts of a Provençal Christmas)
- Quince cheese (a jelly-like confection made from the quince fruit)
- Ratatouille (a vegetable stew with olive oil, aubergine, courgette, bell pepper, tomato, onion and garlic)
- Salade Niçoise (various ingredients, but always with black olives and tuna)
- Socca (unleavened crepe made from chickpea flour, common along the Ligurian Sea coast both in France and Italy)
- Soupe au pistou (bean soup served with a pistou (cognate with Italian pesto) of fine-chopped basil, garlic and Parmesan)
- Tapenade (puree or finely chopped olives, capers, anchovies and olive oil)
- Tarte tropézienne (famous tarte from Saint-Tropez)

== Picardie ==
- Tarte à l'Badrée (milk and cream cake)
- Ficelle Picarde (savory crêpes stuffed with ham and mushroom duxelles)

== French cuisine ingredients ==
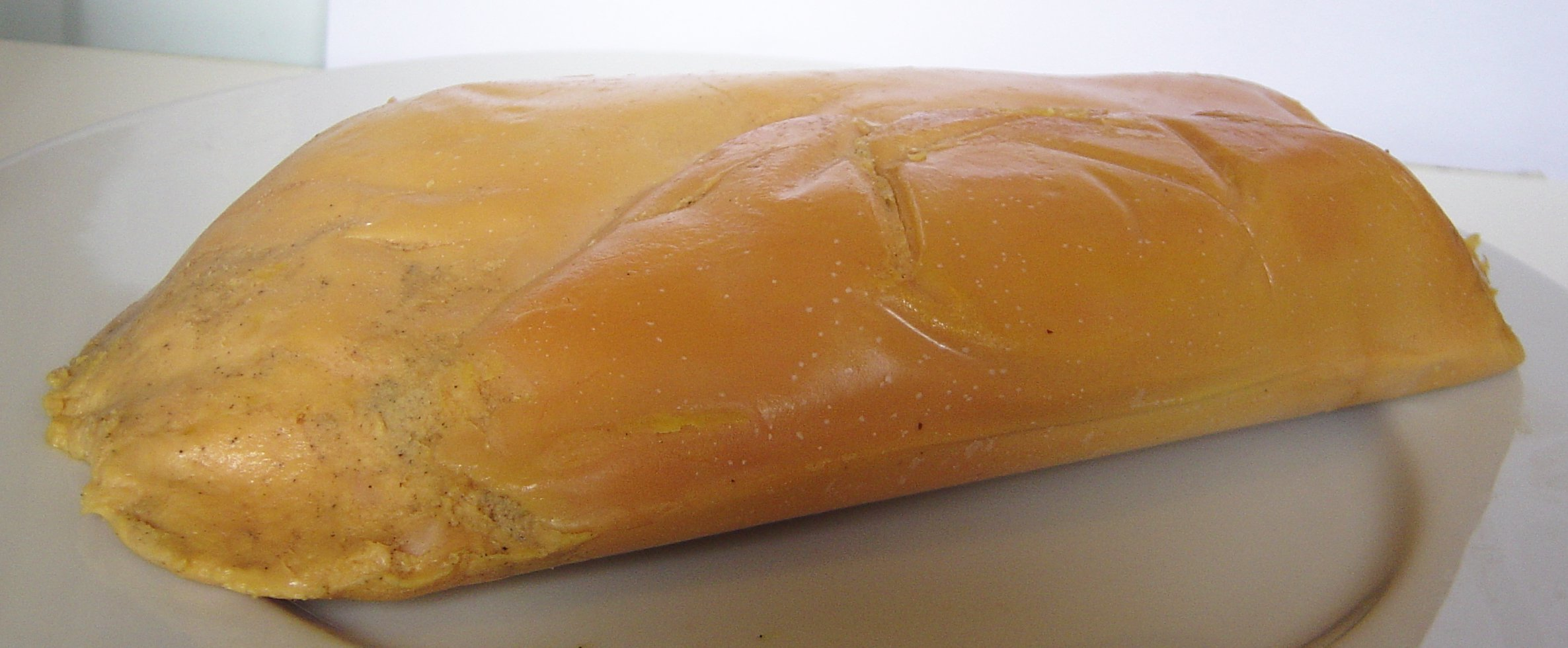
An entire foie gras (partly prepared for a terrine)

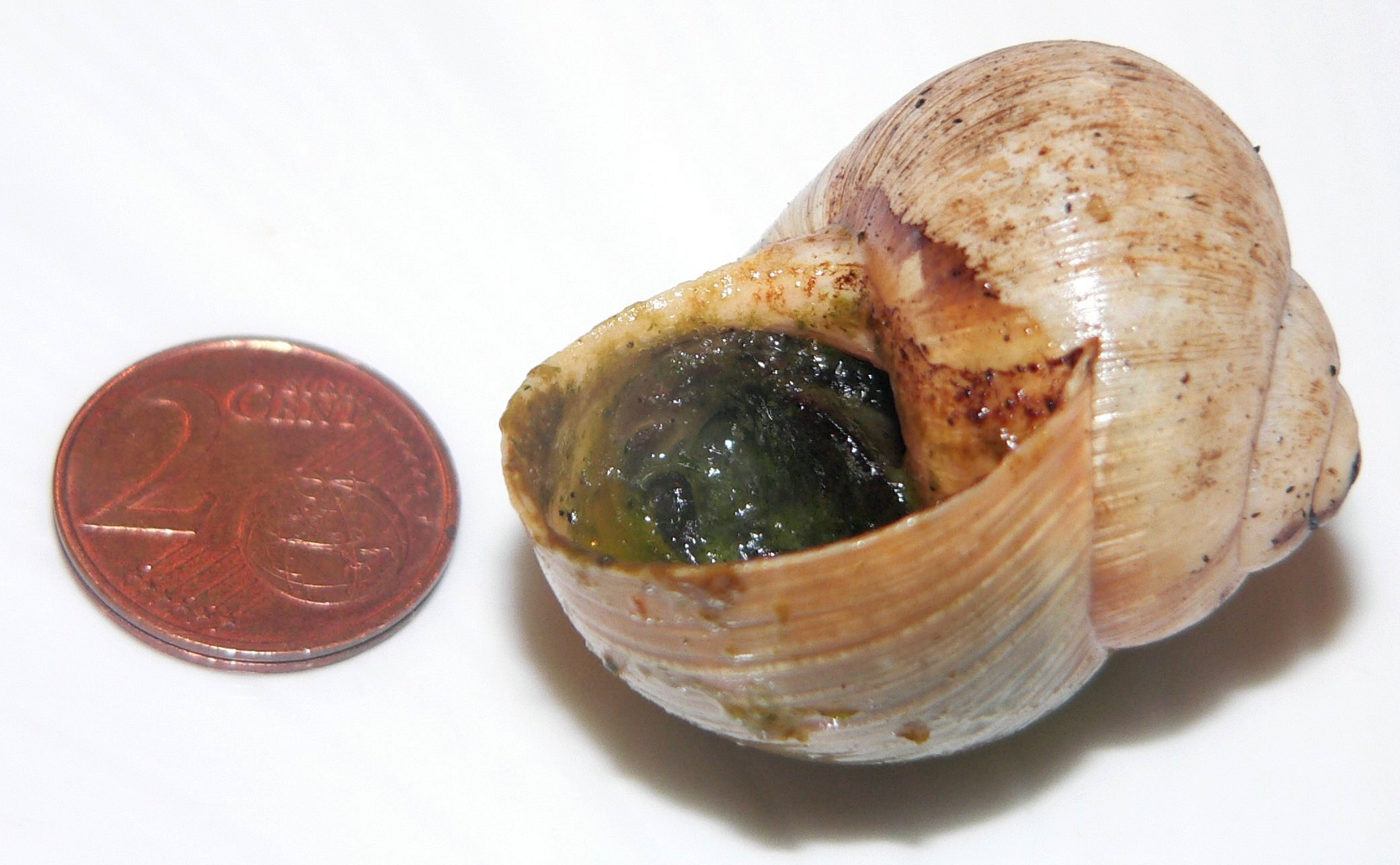
Escargot cooked with garlic and parsley butter in a shell (with a €0.02 coin as scale)

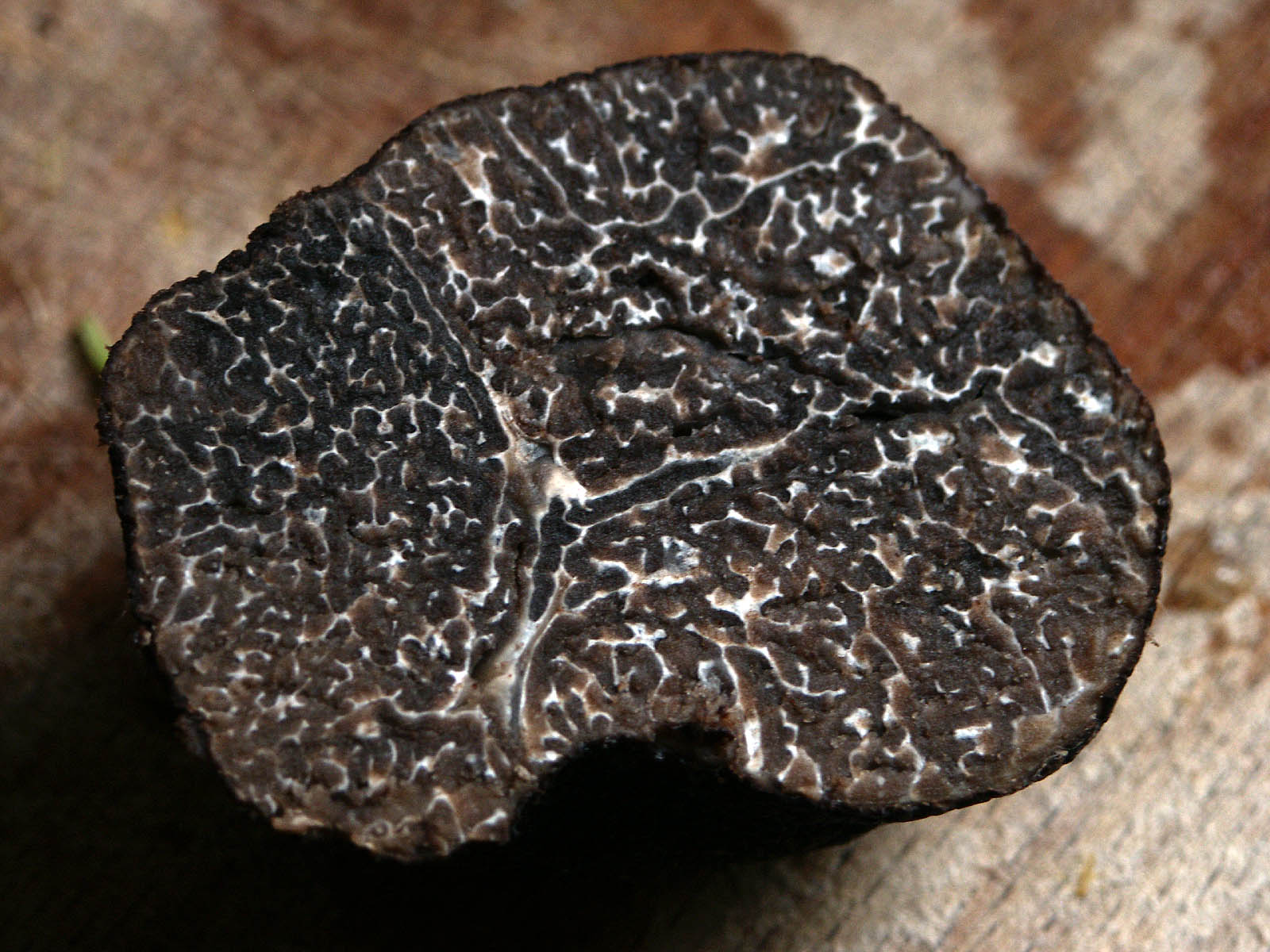
Black Périgord Truffle

French regional cuisines use locally grown vegetables, such as:

- Aubergines
- Carrots
- Courgettes
- Haricot verts (a type of French green bean)
- Leeks
- Mushrooms: oyster mushrooms, cèpes (porcini)
- Potatoes
- Shallots
- Truffle
- Turnips

Common fruits include:

- Apples
- Apricots
- Blackberry
- Blackcurrant
- Cherry
- Grape
- Oranges
- Peaches
- Pears
- Plums
- Raspberry
- Redcurrant
- Strawberry
- Tangerines
- Tomatoes

Meats consumed include:

- Beef
- Chicken
- Duck
- Foie gras
- Goose
- Horse
- Mutton and lamb
- Pork
- Quail
- Rabbit
- Squab
- Turkey
- Veal

Eggs are fine quality and often eaten as:

- Hard-boiled with mayonnaise
- Omelette
- Scrambled plain or haute cuisine preparation

Fish and seafood commonly consumed include:

- Calamari
- Cod
- Escargot (snails)
- Frog legs
- Herring
- Mussels
- Oysters
- Salmon
- Sardines, canned and fresh
- Shrimp
- Trout
- Tuna, canned and fresh

Herbs and seasonings vary by region and include:

- Fennel
- Fleur de sel
- Herbes de Provence
- Lavender
- Marjoram
- Rosemary
- Sage
- Tarragon
- Thyme

Fresh fruit and vegetables, as well as fish and meat, can be purchased either from supermarkets or specialty shops. Street markets are held on certain days in most localities; some towns have a more permanent covered market enclosing food shops, especially meat and fish retailers. These have better shelter than the periodic street markets.

== See also ==
- List of French cheeses
- List of French desserts
- List of French soups and stews

== Sources ==
- Newman, Bryan. Behind the French Menu. French cuisine explained, 2013.
- Steele, Ross. The French Way. 2nd edition. New York: McGraw-Hill, 2006.
