= Occitan cuisine =

Culinary tradition

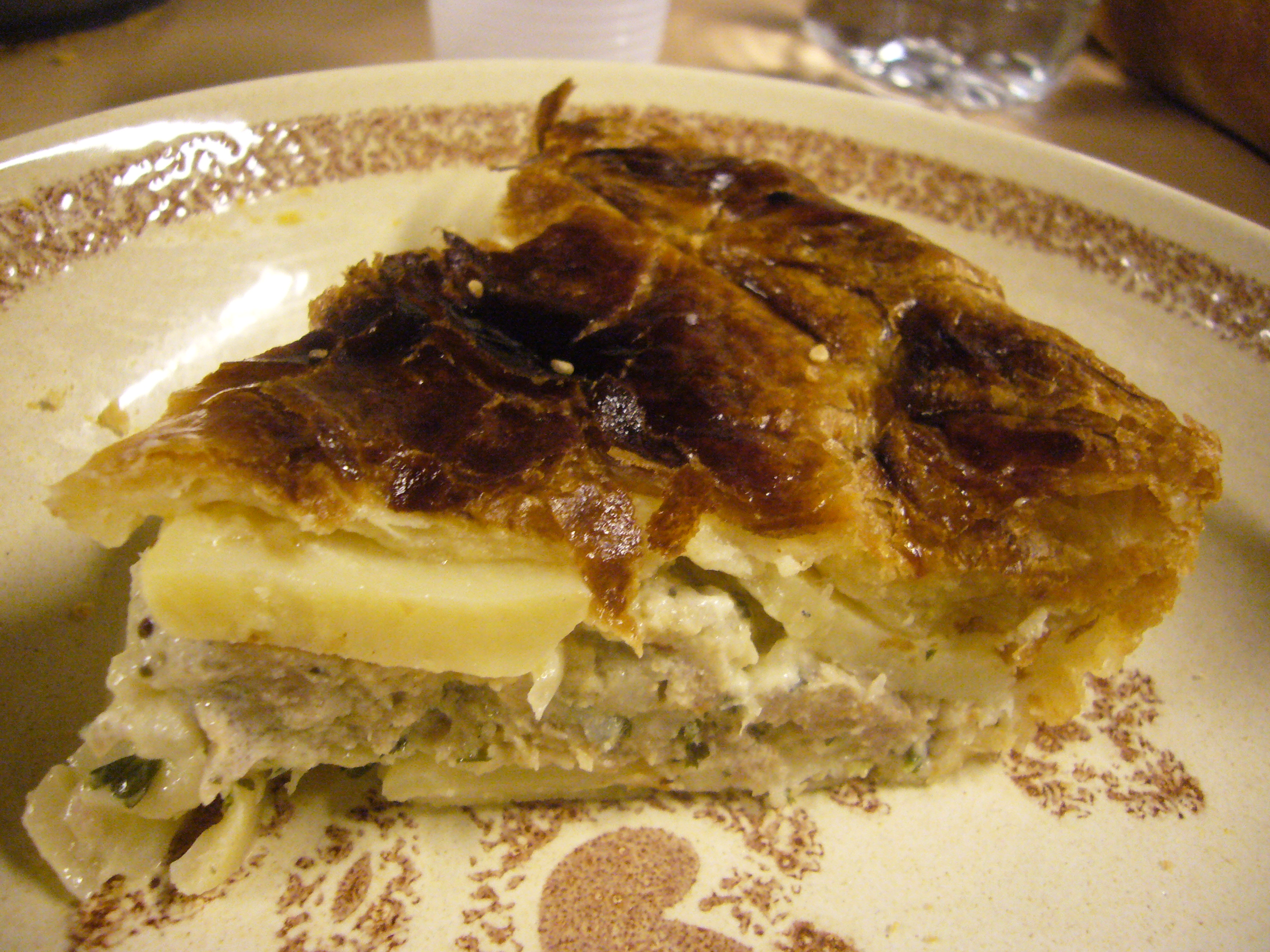
A slice of pastís de treflas, a kind of potato pie

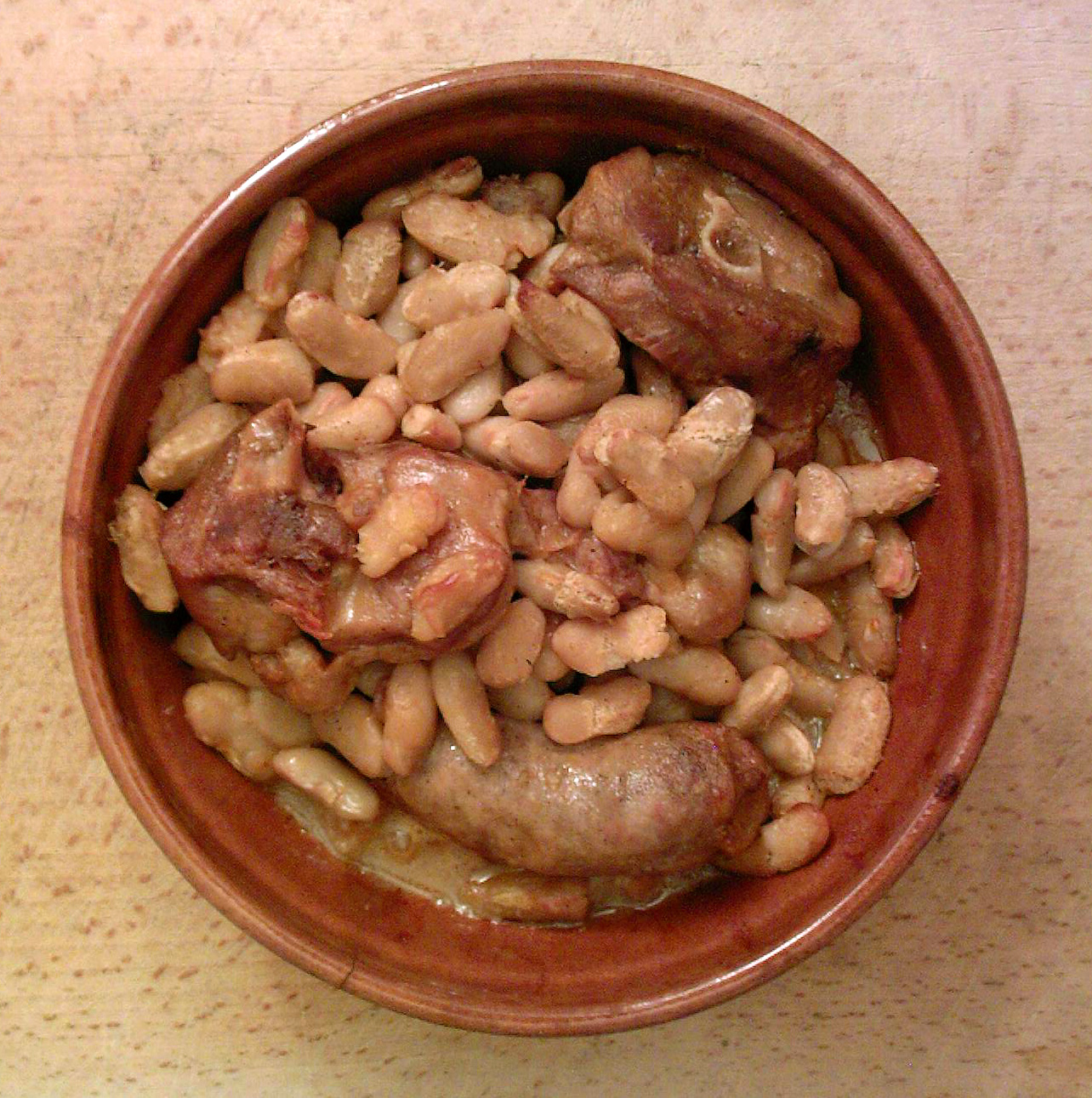
Caçolet (cassoulet), an exemplary dish of Occitan cuisine

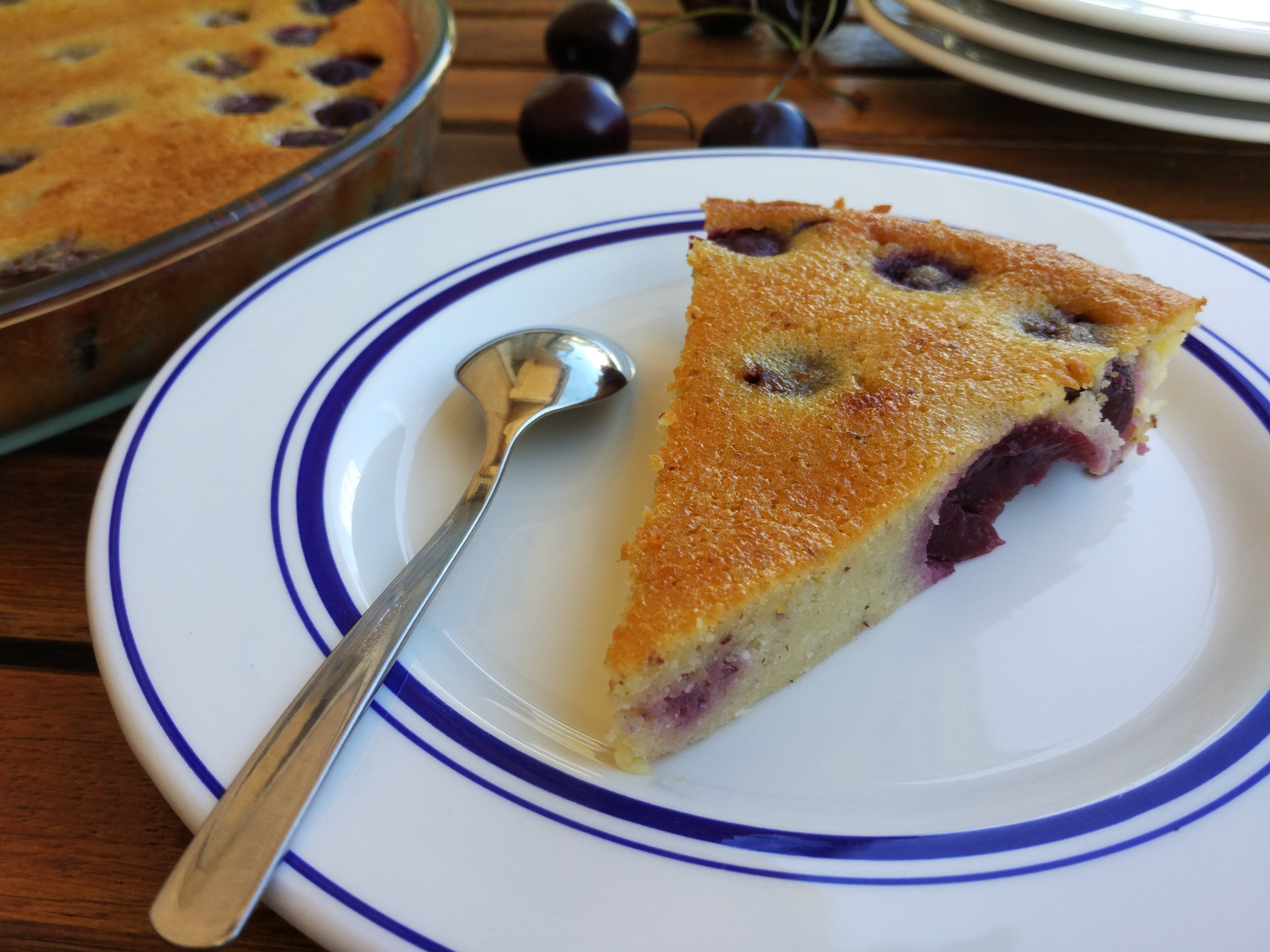
A slice of clafoutis, a cherry-based dessert

Occitan cuisine is the traditional cuisine and gastronomy of Occitania, the supranational region of southern Europe where Occitan is traditionally spoken.

== Introduction ==
Occitan cuisine is a kind of Mediterranean cuisine, very close to Catalan cuisine in the west and to Italian cuisine in the east. This is due not only to the great breadth of Occitania, which goes from the Atlantic Ocean, to the South of France and to the Mediterranean Sea, but to its great geographic diversity as well, the latter whereof grants Occitan cuisine many different kinds of ingredients and dishes adapted to differing localities.

As with other Mediterranean cuisines, it has basic ingredients with strong flavors, such as garlic, olives, salted fish, olive oil and wine, but it also shares some characteristics with Atlantic cuisines, such as the use of cheese and butter. Some of its specialties are well known around the Mediterranean, where they exist in exactly the same form, otherwise with little variation — for example, bolhabaissa, alhòli, ratatolha, and pan golçat (bread with garlic), with emphasis on fines herbes. Other specialties include caçolet, pastís de treflas, aligòt, farcidures (potato and meat dumpling), freginat (fricassee of pork), clafotís, flaunharda, and garbure.

== Bibliography ==
- La cuina del país dels càtars: Cultura i plats d'Occitània, Jaume Fàbrega, Cossetània Edicions, 2003. ISBN 84-96035-80-8
- Mémoires paysannes, Jean Anglade, Éditions de Borée, 2003, ISBN 978-2-84494-153-4
