= Pannenkoek =

Pancake originating from the Netherlands

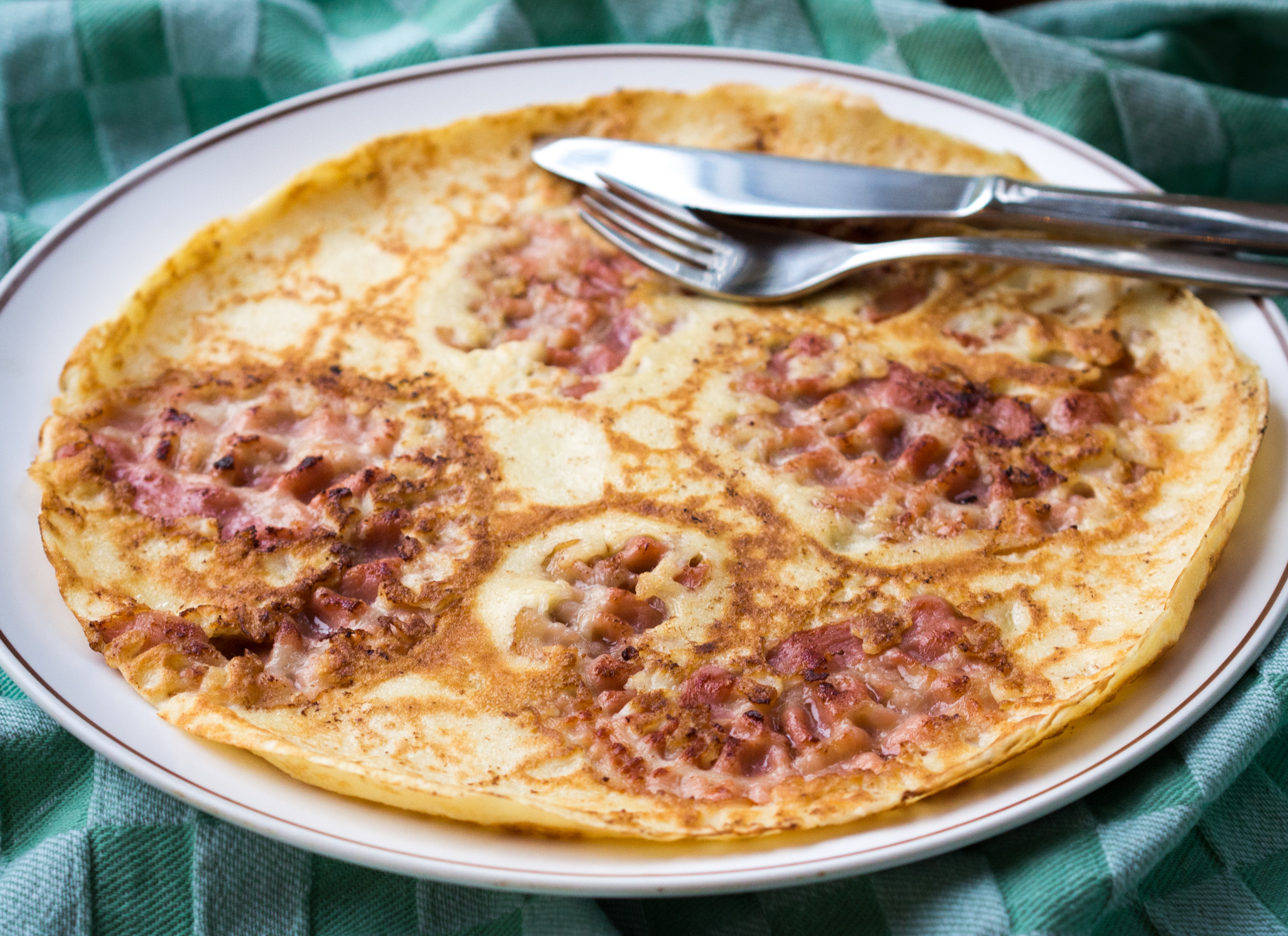
- Pannenkoek with bacon
- Course: Main course
- Place of origin: Netherlands
- Region or state: Northwestern Europe
- Serving temperature: Warm
- Main ingredients: Flour, milk, and eggs

A pannenkoek (Dutch pronunciation: [ˈpɑnə(ŋ)ˌkuk]; plural pannenkoeken [-ˌkukə(n)]) or Dutch pancake is a style of pancake with origins in the Netherlands. Pannenkoeken are usually larger (up to a foot in diameter) and much thinner than their American or Scotch pancake counterparts, but not as thin as crêpes. They may incorporate slices of bacon, apples, cheese, or raisins. Plain ones are often eaten with treacle (syrup made of sugar beets), appelstroop (an unspiced Dutch variety of apple butter) or (powdered) sugar and are sometimes rolled up to be eaten by hand or with cutlery.

Basic ingredients are flour (plain, self-rising or both), milk, salt, and eggs. The addition of buckwheat flour (up to 50 percent) is traditional, but much less common nowadays. Milk can be replaced with soy milk without changing the end result.

The ingredients are beaten into a batter of a fairly liquid consistency. A ladle of batter is then pan fried in butter or oil. Once the top of the pannenkoek is dry and the edges start to brown, it can be flipped over. The first one is often less than perfect. At home a stack of pannenkoeken can be made in advance so everyone can eat at the same time, or people can take turns at the stove.

Pannenkoeken can be, and often are, eaten as a main course, served warm; in winter pannenkoeken are sometimes eaten after snert in a two course meal. Pannenkoeken are a popular choice for a child's birthday meal in the Netherlands and Belgium. Specialised pannenkoeken restaurants are common in the Netherlands and Belgium ("pannenkoekenhuizen" = pancake houses). They often offer a very wide range of toppings and ingredients, traditional and modern (e.g. cheese, oregano and salami on a pizza-pannenkoek).

Dutch and Belgian supermarkets offer pre-cooked (microwavable) pannenkoeken as well as pre-made batter and dry flour mixes. The latter only require added water.

== Regional variations ==
In South Africa, pannenkoek is typically used in singular: "Kom ons eet pannekoek" (Let's eat pannenkoek) (Pannenkoek is Pannekoek in Afrikaans and South Africa) It is served with cinnamon and sugar; the cinnamon sugar mix is sprinkled over the pancake which is then rolled up and—unless consumed instantly—will be wrapped in wax paper to maintain warmth. The cinnamon and sugar melts into this warm and soft treat. It is often prepared as you watch at church bazaars, school fetes, and most any outdoor event which serves freshly cooked food such as barbecue (braaivleis).

As a former Dutch colony, Indonesia also inherited the dish. It is locally known as panekuk and is often eaten with creams inside and sweet dressings such as honey, condensed milk, hagelslag, or simply sprinkled with sugar. It is also a common practice to mix the batter with sliced banana fruits.

== See also ==
- Crêpe
- Clafoutis
- Flaugnarde
- Kaiserschmarrn, an Austrian version
- Okonomiyaki, a Japanese savory pancake with many fillings
- Pannukakku, a Finnish version
- Palatschinke
