= Mayukh Sen =

American writer

Mayukh Sen is an American biographer and essayist. He is the author of the nonfiction books Taste Makers: Seven Immigrant Women Who Revolutionized Food in America (2021) and Love, Queenie: Merle Oberon, Hollywood's First South Asian Star (2025). He was nominated for a James Beard Award in 2018 and 2019, winning the award in 2018 for his profile of Princess Pamela. For Love, Queenie, he was named a finalist for the 2025 National Book Critics Circle Award for Biography.

== Writing career ==
External videos
- Q&A interview with Sen on Taste Makers, November 21, 2021, C-SPAN

Sen is the author of Taste Makers: Seven Immigrant Women Who Revolutionized Food in America, which was published by W.W. Norton & Co in 2021. The nonfiction book is a journey through America's modern culinary history, told through the lives of seven path-breaking female chefs and food writers. His second book, Love, Queenie: Merle Oberon, Hollywood's First South Asian Star, published by W.W. Norton & Co in 2025, is the first biography of the India-born Golden Age Hollywood actress Merle Oberon in over 40 years.

== Food writing ==
Sen began food writing "by accident" when he began working at Food52. The stories he wrote there often focused on the marginalized, or on experiences that set him apart from other staff. The first piece of his to get significant attention was about fruitcake on Food52: "As someone who's queer and Bengal, I grew up eating fruitcake and really treasuring it. I sit in between these two meanings of the word and explored that whole idea in detail, where I metabolized all of that personal writing very early on in my food writing career." It was called "How—and Why—Did Fruitcake Become a Slur?"

At just 26, Sen won a James Beard Journalism Award in Profile Writing, for a longform profile on Princess Pamela. The James Beard Award is known as the “Oscar of the food world.” Sen didn't expect to win, and wrote his acceptance speech on the back of a gum wrapper on the cab ride over.

Princess Pamela was a soul food restaurateur who vanished when she was 70. In the article, Sen says, "You could call her the doyenne of soul food for New York, when the city had precious few soul food restaurants. She earned this title during a time when her black skin, her womanhood, and her Southern accent weren't just signifiers of identity; they were handicaps that limited her possibilities in the culinary world. Pamela’s defiance of odds was, for these reasons alone, both singular and unprecedented."

Sen was also nominated for the 2019 James Beard MFK Fisher Distinguished Writing Award. His work has been anthologized in four editions of The Best American Food and Travel Writing anthologies.

Sen was nominated for a 2024 IACP Award for his article, "Meet America’s Godmother of Tofu", in Gastro Obscura.

== Personal life ==
Sen is queer and of Bengali descent. He went to Stanford University, where he studied film. While he was an undergraduate, his father was diagnosed with lung cancer, and he moved back to New York to help care for him. His father was a film buff, and Sen was drawn to writing about film initially. When Sen's father died, he began writing to work through his grief.

Sen teaches film and television journalism at New York University. He is currently sober.
