= Tarte à l'badrée =

French dessert

- Type: Custard
- Course: Dessert
- Place of origin: France
- Region or state: Picardy
- Main ingredients: crème fraîche and eggs
- Ingredients generally used: Vanilla beans
- Similar dishes: Crème caramel

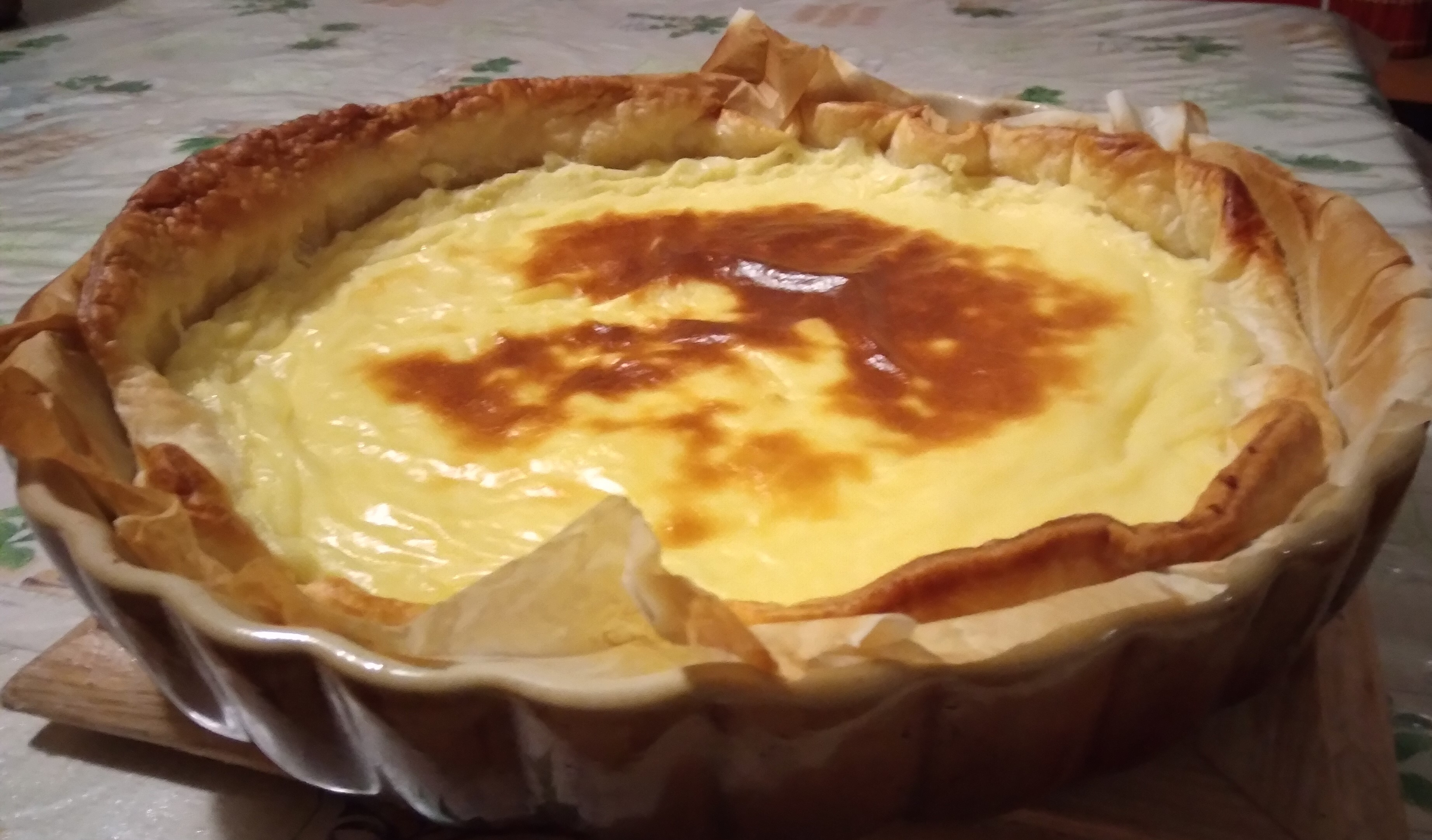
Tarte à l'badrée

Tarte à l'badrée is an ancient cream-based tart from the Picardy region of France. It was a popular dessert in the 16th century. It has since fallen out of popularity.

The custard, called badré, was made from milk, sugar, vanilla beans, and eggs. The custard would then be poured into a shortcrust pastry and baked.

== See also ==
- List of French dishes
- List of desserts
- Crème caramel
- Custard
- Egg tart
- Pastel de nata
- Tarte Tatin
- Shortcrust pastry
