= The Essential New York Times Cookbook =

2010 cookbook by Amanda Hesser

The Essential New York Times Cookbook is a cookbook published by W. W. Norton & Company and authored by former The New York Times food editor Amanda Hesser. The book was originally published in October 2010 and contains over 1,400 recipes from the past 150 years in The New York Times (as of 2010), all of which were tested by Hesser and her assistant, Merrill Stubbs, prior to the book's publication. The book has recipes dating from the mid 1850s, when The New York Times first began publishing topics about food and recipes.

The book has been described by some sources as an update to the 1961 book The New York Times Cookbook that was authored by Craig Claiborne. However, the book's overall format is in a different style, and the book has also been described as having "nothing to do with Claiborne save for the occasional inclusion of one of his recipes". Hesser also states in the book's introduction that it is "not an update of Claiborne's book".

The book covers all major categories of food, and the book covers a myriad of recipes from various eras, such as an 1877 tomato soup recipe, a 1968 sour cream coffee cake recipe, and Eisenhower's steak in the fire from 1907, among many others.

In a 2010 review by Saveur magazine the book received accolades as consisting of a "tremendously appealing collection of recipes that tells the story of American cooking".

== Revised edition ==
A revised edition titled The Essential New York Times Cookbook: Lovingly Revised and Exceedingly Cookable was published in November 2021, which was expanded to include some new recipes. For the revised edition, 120 new dishes were added and 65 were removed. Some of the 19th century recipes were derived from reader submissions to The New York Times.

== Awards ==
The Essential New York Times Cookbook became a New York Times bestseller and won a James Beard Award.
