= Chicken Marengo =

French dish

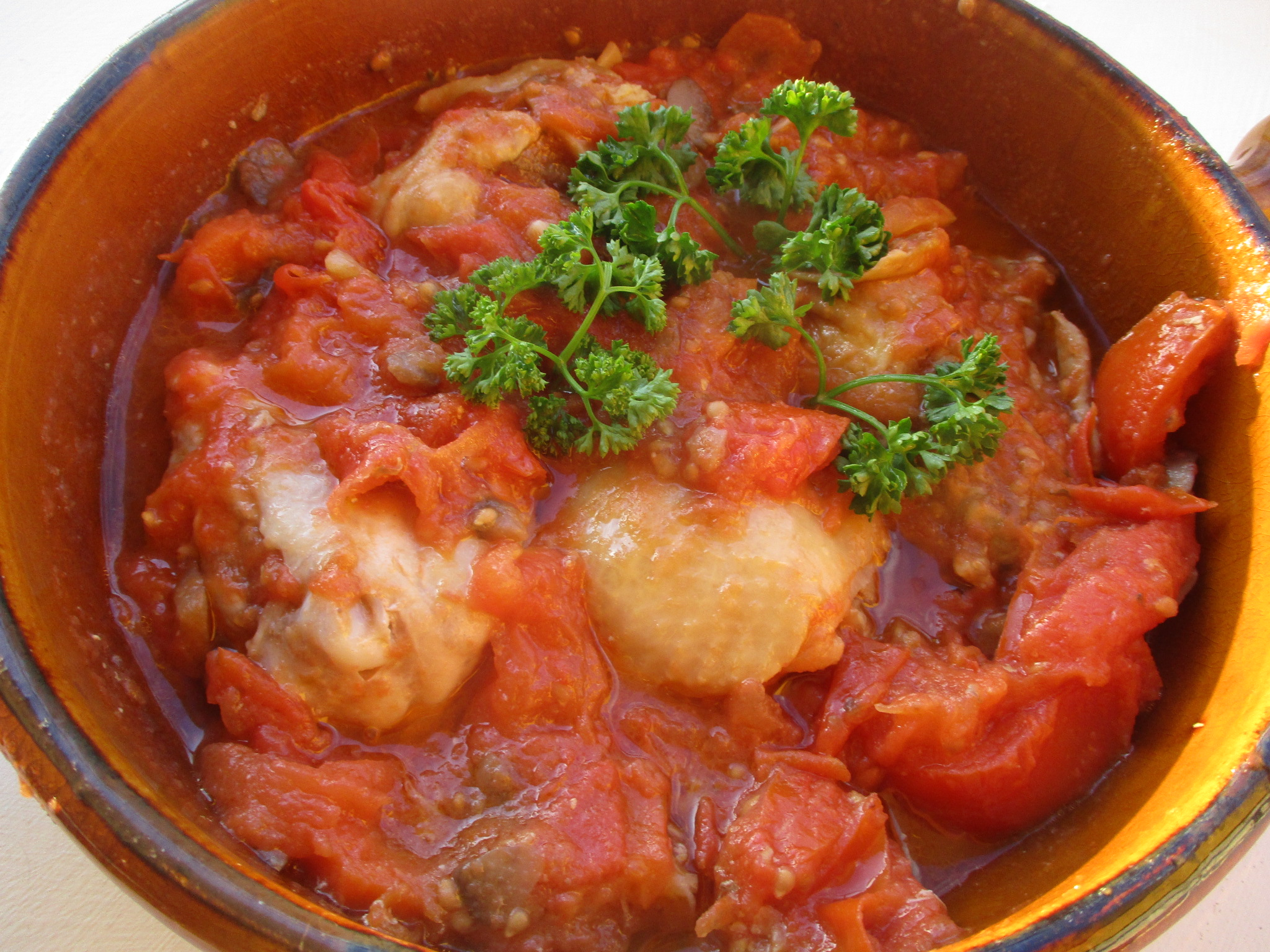
Chicken Marengo

Chicken Marengo is a French dish consisting of a chicken sautéed in oil with garlic and tomato, garnished with fried eggs and crayfish. The dish is similar to chicken à la Provençale, but with the addition of egg and crayfish, which are traditional to chicken Marengo but are now often omitted. The original dish was named to celebrate the Battle of Marengo, a Napoleonic victory of June 1800.

== History ==
According to a popular myth, the dish was first made after Napoleon defeated the Austrian army at the Battle of Marengo at Marengo south of Alessandria, Italy, when his chef Dunand foraged in the town for ingredients (because the supply wagons were too distant) and created the dish from what he could gather. According to this legend, Napoleon enjoyed the dish so much he had it served to him after every battle, and when Dunand was later better-supplied and substituted mushrooms for crayfish and added wine to the recipe, Napoleon refused to accept it, believing that a change would bring him bad luck.

This colorful story, however, is probably myth; Alan Davidson writes that there would have been no access to tomatoes at that time, and the first published recipe for the dish omits them. The more plausible explanation for the origin of the dish is that it was created by a restaurant chef in Paris to honor Napoleon's victory.

== Recipe ==
Pellegrino Artusi's recipe in his Science of Cooking and the Art of Eating Well is as follows (it lacks tomatoes, crayfish and eggs):

Take a young chicken, remove the neck and legs, and cut into large pieces at the joints. Sauté in 30 grams (about 1 ounce) of butter and one tablespoon of olive oil, seasoning with salt, pepper, and a dash of nutmeg. When the pieces have browned on both sides, skim the fat and add a level tablespoon of flour and a deciliter (about 3 ½ fluid ounces) of wine. Add broth and cover, cooking over low heat until done. Before removing from the fire, garnish with a pinch of chopped parsley; arrange on a serving dish and squeeze half a lemon over it. The result is an appetizing dish.

== See also ==
- List of chicken dishes
- List of French dishes
