= Butter pie =

English savoury pie

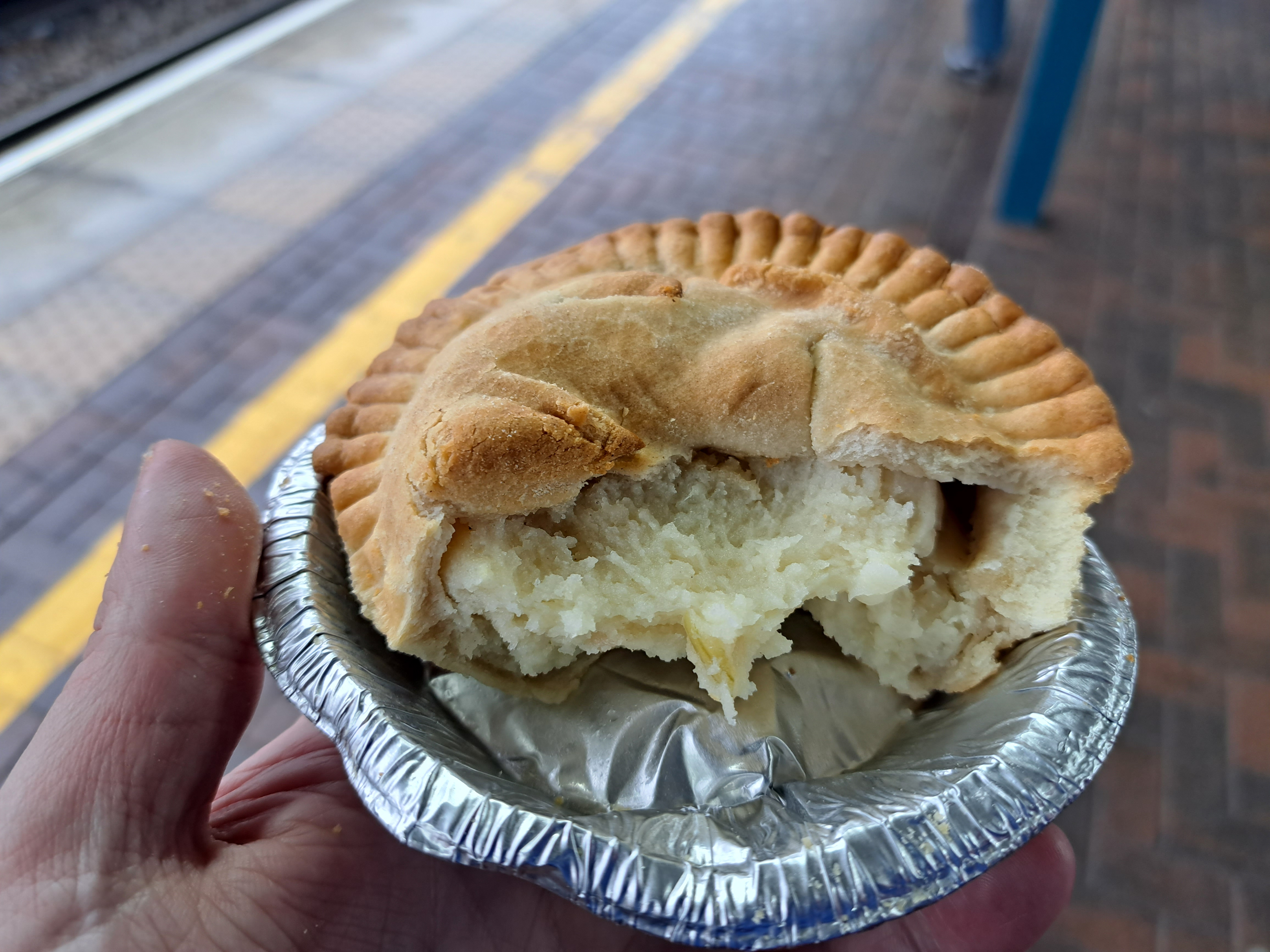
- A butter pie sold in Wigan
- Alternative names: Catholic pie, Friday pie, air pie, a special
- Place of origin: England
- Region or state: Lancashire
- Main ingredients: Potatoes, onions, butter

A butter pie is a traditional English savoury pie consisting mainly of onions, salt, potatoes and butter. It is also sometimes served on a barm cake (unsweetened bun). The pie is stocked by bakeries, chip shops, sandwich shops, local corner shops and some supermarkets within Lancashire. It is also known as Catholic pie, potato pie, Friday pie, air pie or a special.

== History ==
The pie is known to have been created for workers from Lancashire's Catholic community, to consume on days (mainly Friday) when meat could not be eaten.

From 2006, the butter pie was included in the annual World Pie Eating Championship in Wigan, in the vegetarian category.

Butter pies were served on match days at Deepdale, the stadium of Preston North End F.C. until 2007 when the providers, Ashworth Foods Ltd, ceased trading. With the new providers, Holland's Pies not offering a butter pie, two Preston North End fans started a campaign on Facebook calling for the return of butter pies to the matchday menu. As of 2016, the butter pie had returned to Deepdale.

== Areas served ==
The butter pie is served in most areas of the historic boundaries of Lancashire, including Blackburn, Blackpool, Bolton, Burnley, Bury, Chorley, Lancaster, Preston, St Helens and Wigan (whose residents are sometimes known by the nickname pie-eaters).

== See also ==
- Pâté aux pommes de terre
- List of pies, tarts and flans
