= Farçous =

Savoury French pancake

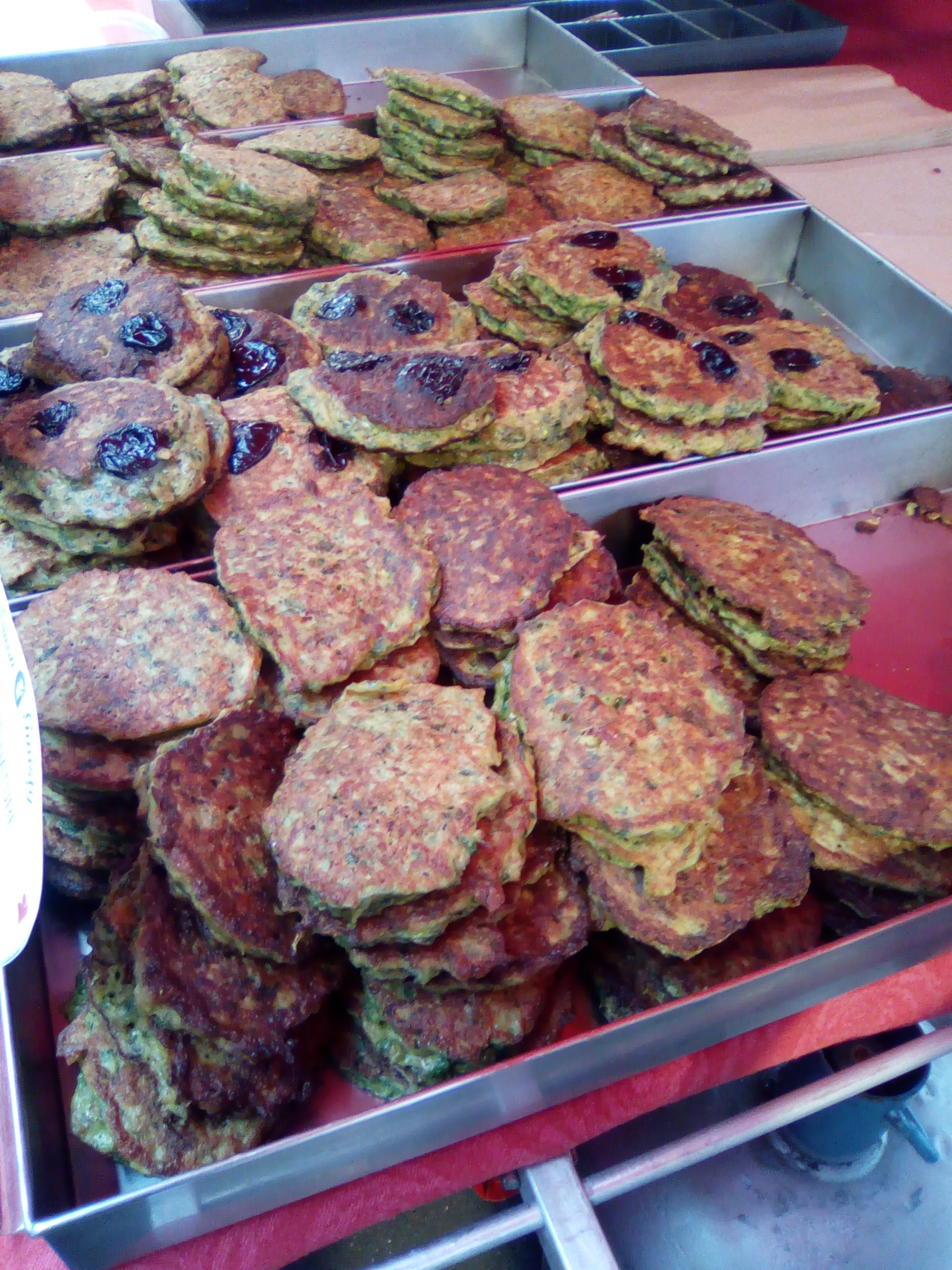
- Trays of farçous in a local farmer's market, prepared with and without prunes.
- Alternative names: farsous, farsun
- Type: pancake
- Place of origin: Aveyron
- Associated cuisine: Occitan cuisine
- Main ingredients: leafy greens, minced pork
- Similar dishes: Kuku Sabzi

Farçous, also farsou, or farsun in rouergat, are savoury pancakes or fritters originating from the Aveyron region of South-Central France. They are made by combining a mixture of chopped wilted chard, spinach or mixed herbs (or some combination of these), minced onion, garlic and parsley, with a thick crèpe batter made from flour, eggs and milk. This mixture is then fried in oil or butter, forming a small, thick pancake with a crisp exterior. Variations are made with and without meat -- chopped bacon, sausages or minced pork are also traditionally included, and some variations also include raisins or prunes.

Traditionally, farçous are served with a fruit jam, though they may also be paired with a white wine. They are may be served warm or at room temperature, as a starter, snack or side dish.

== History ==
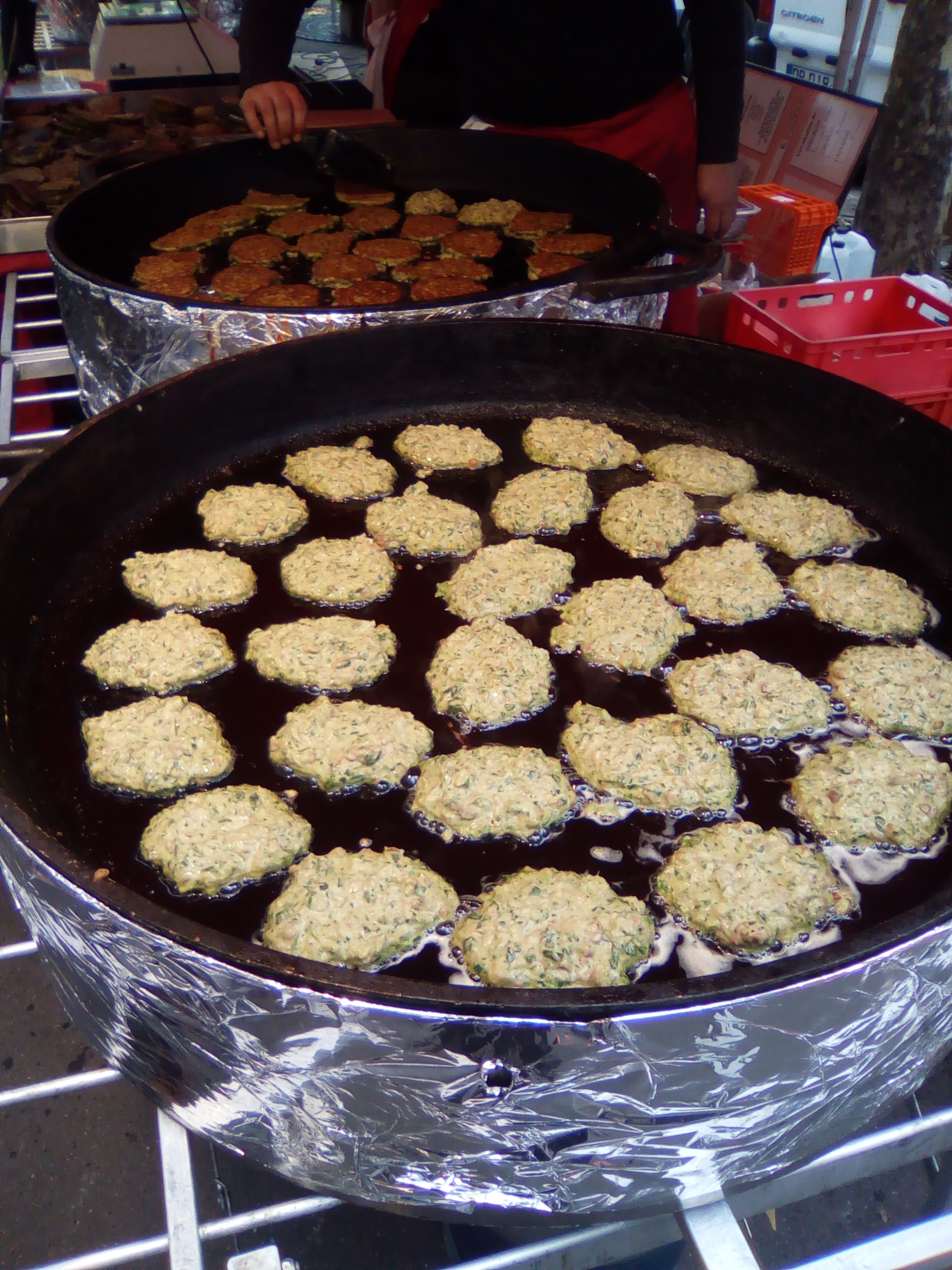
Preparation of a large batch of farçous in a market setting

Farçous originate in the 19th century, in what was then known as Rouergue, as a means of combining foraged wild greens with stale bread, flour and small amounts of meat to make a cheap, nutritious meal for farm workers. The name originates from a rouergat word meaning 'small portions of stuffing'. Post the economic migration of many Aveyronnais to Paris during the 19th century, farçous became a dish also often found in Parisian cafés.

== See also ==
- Kuku Sabzi -- Iranian frittata made with mixed herbs
- Eggah -- an egg dish from Arabic cuisine often prepared with fresh herbs
