= Axoa =

Basque veal dish

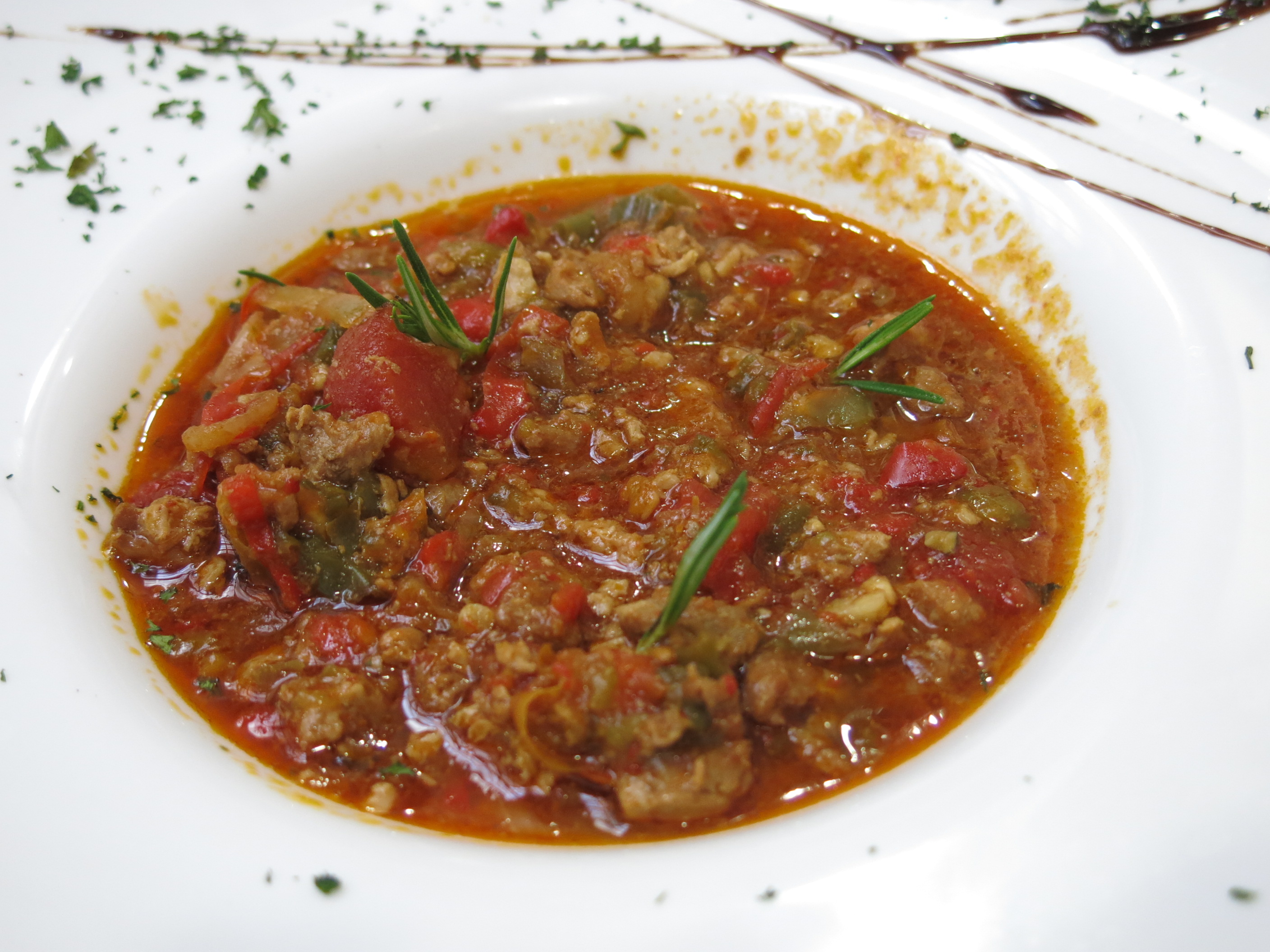
- Type: Stew
- Course: main dish
- Place of origin: France and Spain
- Region or state: Basque Country
- Main ingredients: Veal meat, tomatoes, Onions, red Espelette pepper

Axoa (pronunciation: ashoa) is a typical Basque dish prepared with minced (ground) veal, onions, tomatoes sautéed and flavoured with red Espelette pepper.

This dish was served on the days of fairs. The recipe is not precisely defined.

== See also ==
- List of stews
