= Pâté aux pommes de terre =

French potato dish

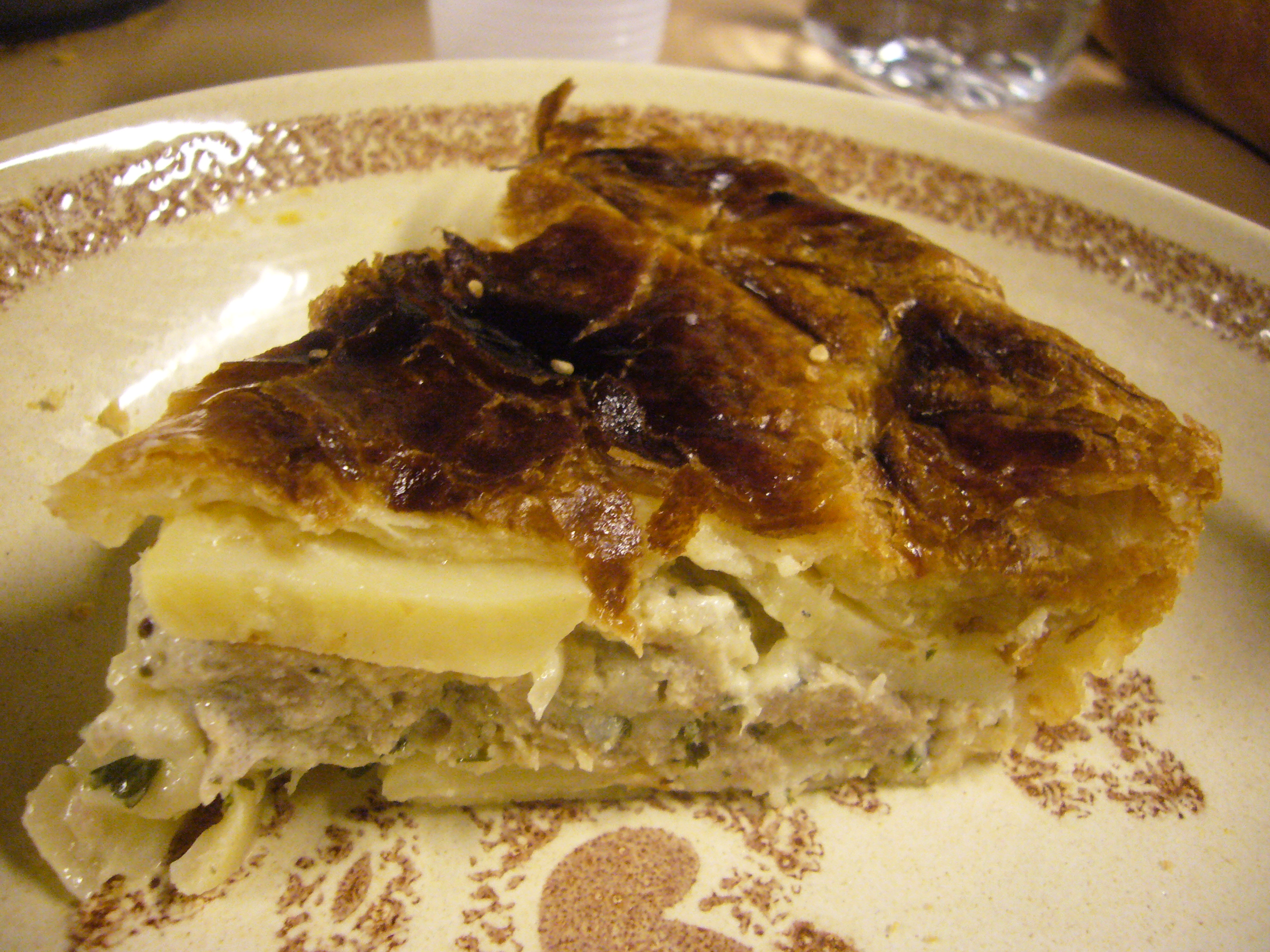
- A slice of pâté aux pommes de terre
- Type: Pie
- Course: Side dish or main course
- Place of origin: France
- Region or state: Centre-Val de Loire, Limousin and Allier
- Main ingredients: Potatoes, crème fraîche, puff pastry

The pâté aux pommes de terre, pronounced [pɑte o pɔm də tɛʁ] (Occitan: pastís de patanas), or pâté de pommes de terre is a speciality of the Centre-Val de Loire, Limousin and Allier (Bourbonnais) regions in Central France. It can be served either as a side dish or as the main course. Today it is often eaten with a green salad. Its main ingredients are potato slices and crème fraîche, which are used to fill a puff pastry crust. The pie is then baked in the oven until the dish is covered with a golden-brown crust.

There are different ways to prepare the pâté aux pommes de terre, and the seasonings vary from family to family. Parsley and onion are common ingredients in the Allier, while the use of garlic and meat is common in the Limousin, Haute-Vienne, and Creuse.

Before potatoes began to be used widely in France in the 19th century, this dish was made with leftover bread dough and was baked with a simple garnish of chopped garlic, flat-leaved parsley, and fatty bacon.

== Other names ==
- Gâteau de pommes de terre (potato cake)
- In the Occitan language, this dish is known as pastis de treflas or as pastis de pompiras, which are two ways of referring to the potato in the Limousin Occitan variant.

== See also ==
- Butter pie
- Occitan cuisine
- List of casserole dishes
- List of pies, tarts and flans
