= Food52 =

Recipe and cookware website

- Company type: Private
- Industry: Cookware; Recipes; Home Accessories
- Founded: 2009; 17 years ago
- Founder: Amanda Hesser and Merrill Stubbs
- Headquarters: New York, New York
- Subsidiaries: Dansk Designs, Schoolhouse
- Website: food52.com

Food52 is a recipe and cookware website. Founded in 2009 by Amanda Hesser and Merrill Stubbs, formerly of the New York Times, its website is intended as a platform for users to publish recipes and discuss cooking. The company also produces its own books.

== History ==
=== 2009–2019 ===
Former New York Times journalists Amanda Hesser and Merrill Stubbs founded Food52 in 2009 with the goal of creating a community in which home cooks can contribute to a database of recipes, with the eventual goal of publishing a cookbook of recipes by the website's contributors. The two developed the idea while working together on a cookbook for The New York Times. The "52" in the website's name represents the number of weeks in a year; the two envisioned that after 52 weeks, the efforts of community members would result in a physical cookbook. The two founded the website using funds they obtained as an advance to their book deal and with money borrowed from Hesser's husband and Stubbs's mother. The website received its first external investment, $750,000 from Joanne Wilson and Kenneth Lerer, one year after it was launched. It was headquartered in Chelsea, New York City, before later re-locating to the Brooklyn Navy Yard.

By 2014, the website had 29,000 recipes, 90% of which were user-submitted recipes, according to the New York Times. The company started an imprint, Food52 Works, in partnership with Ten Speed Press in 2015. Its first title Food52 Genius Recipes, a crowdsourced cookbook, was set for publication in 2015.

In February 2017, noting that 92 percent of the company was white, Hesser and Stubbs released a statement on the company's intent to address the racial equality of its workplace. In January 2018, the company published a letter on their efforts, noting that the staff was now 76% white. The website also began selling its own brand of products in 2018; it had until then only sold other brands. The company reported revenues of $30 million that year.

=== TCG ownership (2019–2025) ===
The private equity firm TCG acquired a majority stake in Food52 in late 2019. Upon acquisition, the company announced it would use the capital establish a physical store for its home goods, hire more employees, and buyout existing shareholders. The company then purchased Dansk Designs, a tableware brand, with plans to revive the brand. Co-founder and president Merrill Stubbs left the company in 2020 and was replaced by Claire Chambers, formerly of Walmart.

TCG invested $80 million in capital into Food52 in 2021, and the funds were used to fund Food52's acquisition of Schoolhouse, a lighting and lifestyle shopping website, for $48 million. In 2022, the company announced it would be laying off 20 people and later named Alex Bellos, formerly of West Elm, as a CEO in advance of Hesser becoming executive chair.

=== Bankruptcy and sale ===
On December 29, 2025, Food52 filed for Chapter 11 bankruptcy protection as part of an agreement to sell itself and its assets to America's Test Kitchen for an undisclosed amount, who will provide the company with new capital via debtor-in-possession financing to keep it operating throughout the procedure.

== Content ==
The website was founded to serve as a platform for users to publish recipes and discuss cooking. It also produces its own books. The website employs like buttons to allow readers to moderate the quality of its content, the majority of which is user-generated (of the 29,000 recipes on the website in 2014, 90% were created by users).

Until 2020, the website held a yearly cookbook tournament, the Piglet Tournament of Cookbooks, in which the website asked food industry figures, such as chefs, to judge cookbooks against each other in a 16-cookbook NCAA-style tournament.

=== Publications ===
- Amanda Hesser; Merrill Stubbs; Food52 Community (2011). The Food52 Cookbook: 140 Winning Recipes from Exceptional Home Cooks. Morrow.
- Amanda Hesser; Merrill Stubbs; Food52 Community (2012). The Food52 Cookbook, Volume 2: Seasonal Recipes From Our Kitchens To Yours. Morrow.
- Kristen Miglore (2015). Food52 Genius Recipes: 100 Recipes that Will Change the Way You Cook. Ten Speed Press.
- Editors of Food52 (2015). Food52 Baking: 60 Sensational Treats You Can Pull Off in a Snap. Ten Speed Press.
- Food52 Holiday Recipes & Party Planning Guide (2015; video book available on Apple devices)
- Gena Hamshaw (2015). Food52 Vegan: 60 Vegetable-Driven Recipes for Any Kitchen. Ten Speed Press.
- Amanda Hesser; Merrill Stubbs (2016). Food52 A New Way to Dinner: A Playbook of Recipes and Strategies for the Week Ahead. Ten Speed Press.
- Editors of Food52 (2017). Food52 Mighty Salads: 60 New Ways to Turn Salad into Dinner. Ten Speed Press.
- Editors of Food52 (2017). Food52 Ice Cream and Friends: 60 Recipes and Riffs for Sorbets, Sandwiches, No-Churn Ice Creams, and More. Ten Speed Press.
- Paula Disbrowe (2018). Food52 Any Night Grilling: 60 Ways to Fire Up Dinner (and More). Ten Speed Press.
- Kristen Miglore (2018). Food52 Genius Desserts: 100 Recipes That Will Change the Way You Bake. Ten Speed Press.
- Tyler Kord (2019). Food52 Dynamite Chicken: 60 Never-Boring Recipes for Your Favorite Bird; A Cookbook. Ten Speed Press.
- Editors of Food52 (2020). Food52 Your Do-Anything Kitchen: The Trusty Guide to a Smarter, Tidier, Happier Space. Ten Speed Press.
- Emma Laperruque (2021). Food52 Big Little Recipes: Good Food with Minimal Ingredients and Maximal Flavor. Ten Speed Press.
- Kristen Miglore (2022). Food52 Simply Genius: Recipes for Beginners, Busy Cooks & Curious People. Ten Speed Press.

=== Awards ===
Food52 won the James Beard Foundation Award for Publication of the Year (2012) and was a nominee for the Group Food Blog award in 2015. Mayukh Sen received the 2018 James Beard Foundation Award for his profile for Food52, "She Was a Soul Food Sensation. Then, 19 Years Ago, She Disappeared." As of 2024, there are 8 other writers for Food52 who were nominated for awards from the James Beard Foundation: Kristen Miglore (2014), Michael E. Hoffman, Ryan Hamilton, Ryan Merrill, James Ransom, and Timothy McSweeney (all 2015), Allison Robicelli (2017), and Layla Khoury-Hanold (2023).

The website won the International Association of Culinary Professionals Award for Culinary Web Site in 2013; Best Culinary Website and Publication of the Year (both ties) in 2014; and Best Culinary Website in 2015.
