= Amanda Hesser =

American food writer

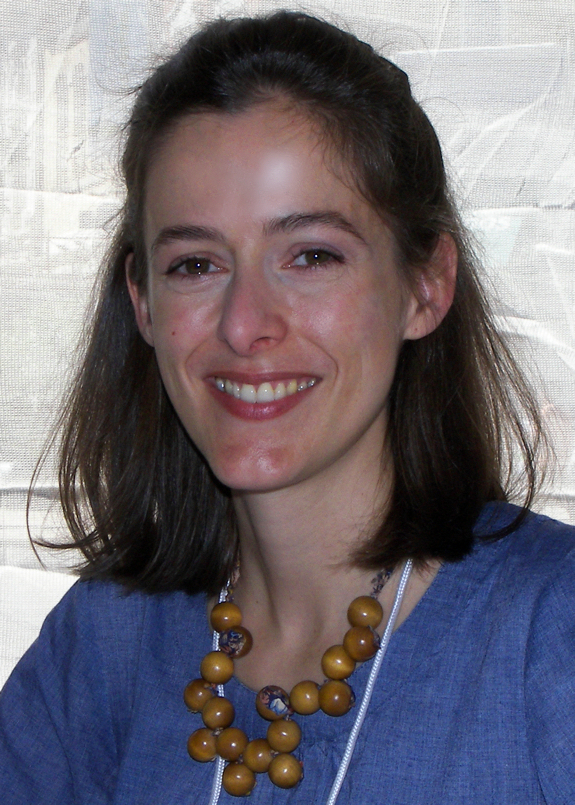
- Hesser at the 2010 Texas Book Festival.
- Born: 1971 (age 54–55)

Amanda Hesser (born 1971) is an American food writer, editor, cookbook author and entrepreneur. Most notably, she was the food editor of The New York Times Magazine, the editor of T Living, a quarterly publication of The New York Times, author of The Essential New York Times Cookbook which was a New York Times bestseller, and co-founder and CEO of Food52.

== Biography ==
After finishing her first book, in 1997, Hesser was hired as a food reporter for The New York Times where she wrote more than 750 stories. While at the Times, Hesser wrote about the influence of Costco on the wine industry, and how the Farmer Consumer Advisory Committee made decisions for the New York City Greenmarket. She was also among the first to write about Ferran Adrià of El Bulli in a major American publication.

Hesser was involved in two cases of conflict of interest while working at the Times. In 2004, she awarded the restaurant Spice Market a three-star rating without disclosing that the year before, the restaurant's owner, Jean-Georges Vongerichten, had provided a complimentary jacket blurb for her book Cooking for Mr. Latte. In 2007, Hesser published a favorable review of Vegetable Harvest by Patricia Wells without noting that in 1999, Wells had provided a jacket blurb for Hesser's book The Cook and the Gardener. In both cases, the Times subsequently pointed out the conflicts of interest with editors' notes.

While Hesser left the Times in March 2008 to focus on the development of Food52, she continued to write the "Recipe Redux" feature for the Times magazine until February 27, 2011.

As co-founder and CEO of Food52, she has raised two rounds of investment from parties including Lerer Hippeau Ventures and Bertelsmann Digital Media Investments. Food52 has won numerous notable awards, including the James Beard Foundation Award for Publication of the Year (2012) and the International Association of Culinary Professionals Award for Best Website (2013). In February 2017, noting that 92 percent of the company was white, she and her co-founder Merrill Stubbs "issued a statement about the ways in which the company intended to redress a lack of racial equality in its workplace." By the following January, "they published a follow-up letter updating readers on the progress of their efforts, stating that their staff had been reduced to being 76 percent white."

Hesser was featured in Food & Wine's 40 under 40 list, was named one of the 50 most influential women in food by Gourmet magazine, and had a cameo as herself in the film Julie & Julia.

Hesser lives in Brooklyn Heights with her husband, Tad Friend, a staff writer for The New Yorker, and their two children.

== Bibliography ==
=== Books ===
- The Cook and the Gardener (W. W. Norton & Company, 1999)
- Cooking for Mr. Latte: A Food Lover's Courtship, with Recipes (W. W. Norton & Company, 2004) [Collected Food Diary columns she wrote from 2000 to 2002]
- Eat, Memory: Great Writers at the Table, a Collection of Essays from the New York Times (W. W. Norton & Company, 2009) [Edited 26 previously published essays]
- The Essential New York Times Cookbook: Classic Recipes for a New Century (W. W. Norton & Company, 2010)
- The Food52 Cookbook: 140 Winning Recipes from Exceptional Home Cooks (William Morrow Cookbooks, 2011)
- The Food52 Cookbook, Volume 2: Seasonal Recipes from Our Kitchens to Yours (William Morrow Cookbooks, 2012)
- Food52 Genius Recipes: 100 Recipes That Will Change the Way You Cook (Ten Speed Press, 2015)
- Food52 Vegan: 60 Vegetable-Driven Recipes for Any Kitchen (Ten Speed Press, 2015)
- Food52 Baking: 60 Sensational Treats You Can Pull Off in a Snap (Ten Speed Press, 2015)
- Food52 A New Way to Dinner: A Playbook of Recipes and Strategies for the Week Ahead (Ten Speed Press, 2016)
- Food52 Mighty Salads: 60 New Ways to Turn Salad into Dinner (Ten Speed Press, 2017)
- Food52 Ice Cream and Friends: 60 Recipes and Riffs for Sorbets, Sandwiches, No-Churn Ice Creams, and More (Ten Speed Press, 2017)
- Food52 Any Night Grilling: 60 Ways to Fire Up Dinner (and More) (Ten Speed Press, 2018)
- Food52 Genius Desserts: 100 Recipes That Will Change the Way You Bake (Ten Speed Press, 2018)

=== eBooks ===
- "Food 52 Holiday Recipes & Party Planning Guide: A cookbook, instruction manual, and entertaining battle plan" (Open Air Publishing, 2011)

=== Anthologized works ===
- Women Who Eat (2003)
- Best Food Writing (2002, 2004)
- The Art of Eating (2004)
- Alone in the Kitchen with an Eggplant (2007)
- Eat, Memory: Great Writers at the Table (2009)
