= Gaston Gérard chicken =

Traditional French dish

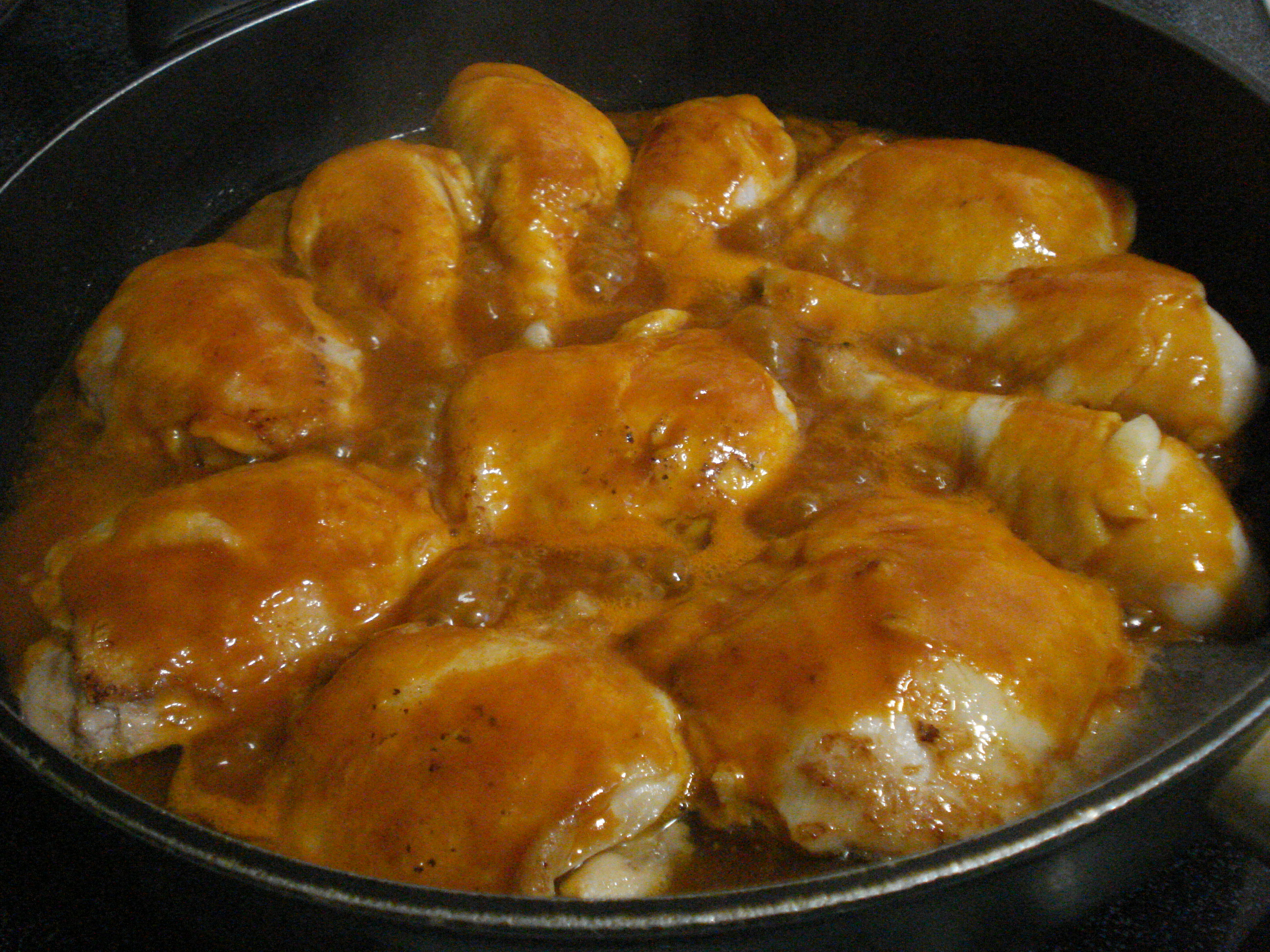
- Gaston Gérard chicken
- Type: French cuisine
- Course: Main course
- Place of origin: France
- Region or state: Burgundy
- Created by: Reine Geneviève Bourgogne; Mrs. Gaston Gérard
- Serving temperature: Warm
- Main ingredients: chicken, White Burgundy wine, lardons, grated cheese, mustard and cream

Gaston Gérard chicken is a typical Burgundian dish. It is also known as chicken Dijon.

== Origin ==
This recipe was created for the first time in 1930 by the wife of the mayor of Dijon, Gaston Gérard, for the French gastronomist, humorist and food critic Curnonsky. Bresse chicken is most often used.

=== History ===
According to one story, Reine Geneviève Bourgogne, first wife of the mayor of Dijon, was preparing a chicken in her usual way for the "prince of gastronomists". There was a serious incident in the kitchen which almost compromised the meal and the reputation of the hostess as a good cook. A jar of mustard (or paprika, but that spice is not in the recipe) fell into the casserole dish and spread out over the poultry as it cooked. Unable to get the condiment out, they added Burgundy white wine, crème fraîche and grated comté. This mixture pleased the famous gastronomic critic. He congratulated the mistress of the house for this recipe which he found strongly to his taste, and named it after his host.

== Ingredients and preparation ==
The chicken is first browned in oil or butter, then left to cook. The sauce is made with the cooking juice, grated cheese, white wine from Burgundy, mustard, and cream. It is served slightly browned and paired with a white wine.

== See also ==
- Burgundy wine
- French cuisine
