= Far Breton =

Dessert cake from Brittany, France

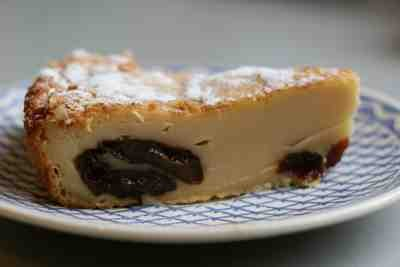
- A piece of a Far Breton cake.
- Type: Cake
- Place of origin: France
- Region or state: Brittany
- Main ingredients: Flour, eggs, milk

Far Breton (also Breton far; Breton: Farz forn) is a traditional cake or dessert from the Brittany region in France. Its base is similar in composition to a clafoutis batter. Common additions include prunes or raisins. Numerous recipes available at popular websites suggest soaking the dried fruits in alcohol; however, this is not traditional practice.

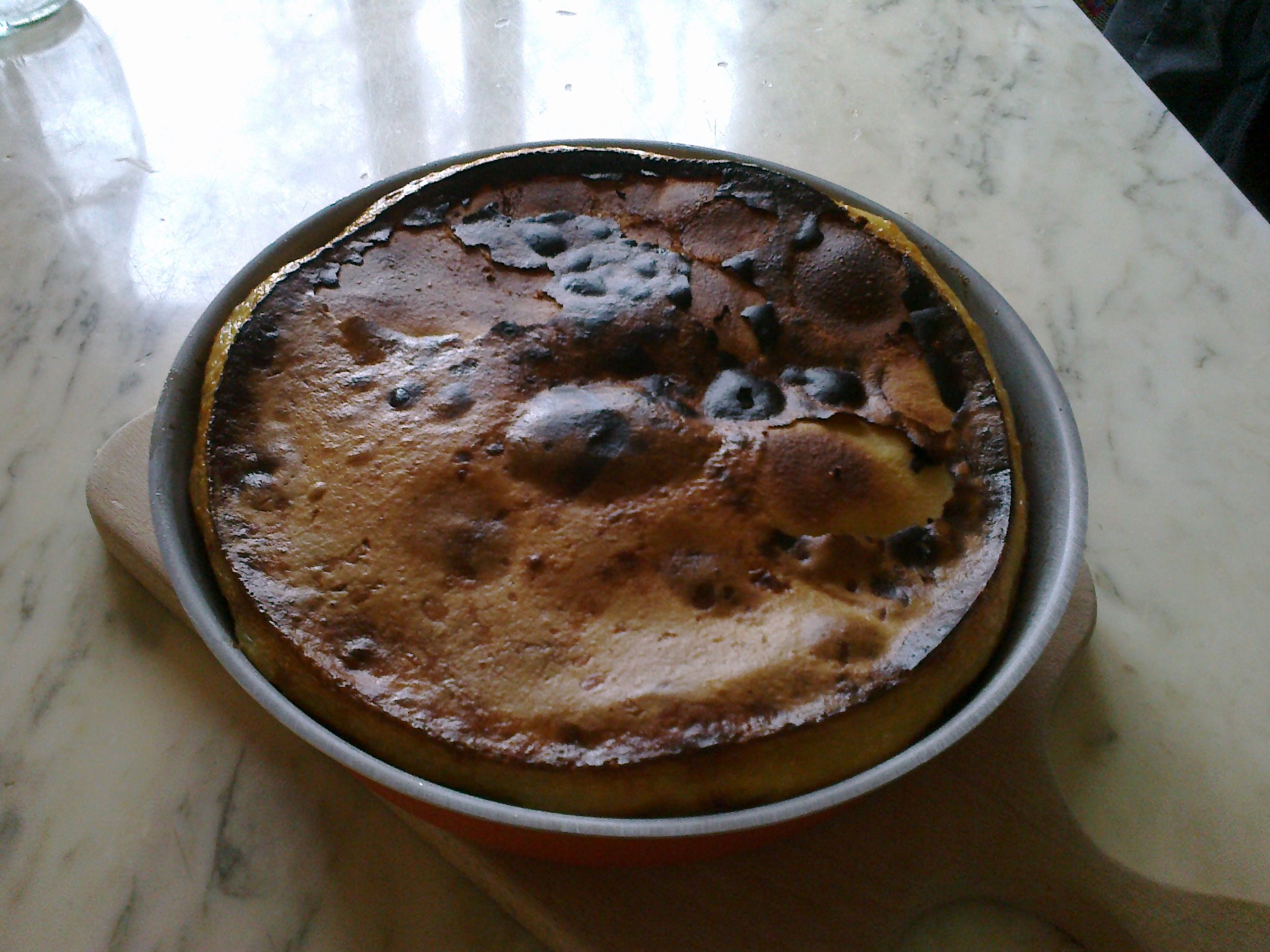
Far Breton with a slightly charred top surface

Far Breton as served in Brittany is often cooked to a much more "burnt" appearance than online recipes indicate; the top of the custard appears nearly blackened rather than golden-brown.

== See also ==
- Flaugnarde
- Kig ha farz
