= Clafoutis =

French dessert or breakfast dish containing cherries

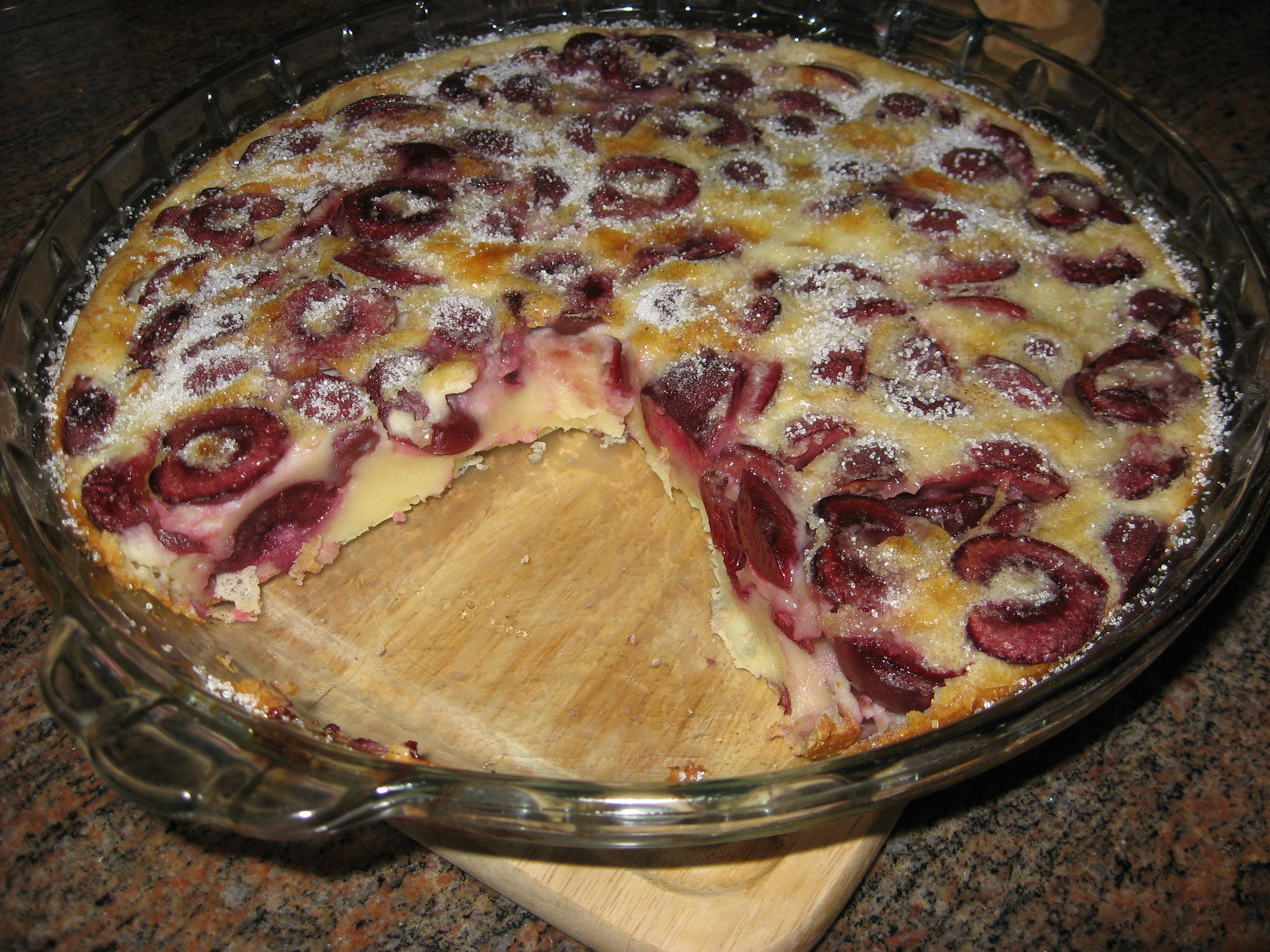
- Clafoutis made with pitted cherries
- Type: Tart
- Course: Dessert, breakfast
- Place of origin: France
- Region or state: Limousin
- Serving temperature: Warm, room temperature, or chilled
- Main ingredients: Eggs, double cream, sour cherries
- Ingredients generally used: Flour or almond flour, fruit brandy, powdered sugar, sugar
- Variations: Flaugnarde

Clafoutis (French pronunciation: [klafuti]; Occitan: clafotís [klafuˈtis] or [kʎafuˈtiː]), sometimes spelled clafouti in Anglophone countries, is a French dish of sour cherries, arranged in a buttered dish, covered with a thick but pourable batter, then baked to create a crustless tart. Originating from the Limousin region, the clafoutis is traditionally dusted with powdered sugar and served tepid, sometimes with cream, as a dessert. It can also be served as a breakfast or brunch main or side dish.

== Etymology ==
One proposed derivation of the dish's name is from the Occitan language clafotís, from the verb clafir, meaning "to fill" (implied: "the batter with cherries"). Occitan is the local language of Limousin, the home of clafoutis. Another potential etymology is that clafir comes from the Old French claufir, meaning "to fix with nails", explained as the cherries having the appearance of nail heads.

== Variations and similar dishes ==
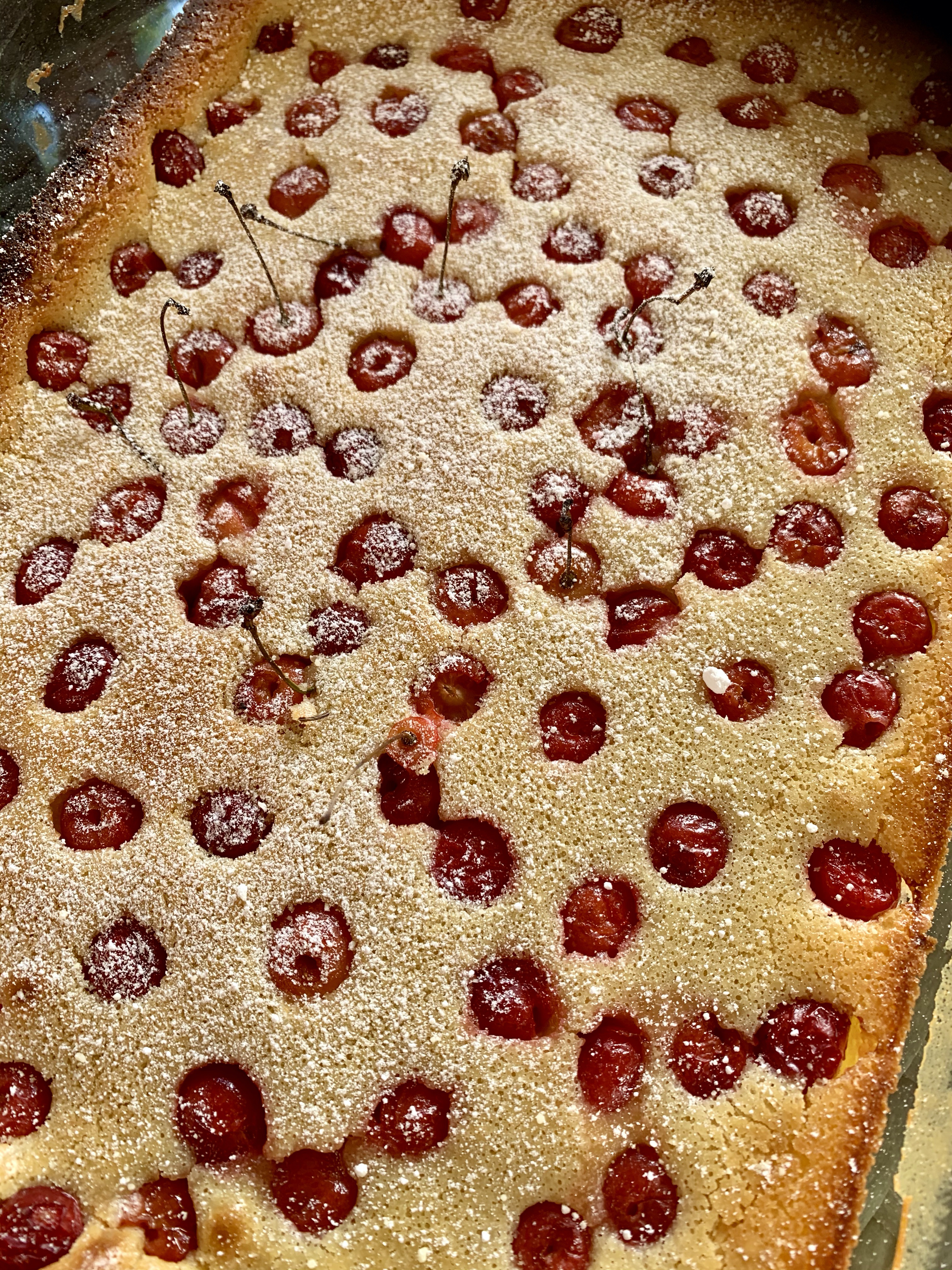
Clafoutis with unpitted cherries

While unpitted sour cherries are traditional, there are numerous variations using other fruits. This includes pitted red or black cherries, other stonefruit such as peaches or plums, and other fruit like apples or pears, or berries. Savoury clafoutis, without sugar, is made with summer vegetables and sometimes cheese.

A flaugnarde is a similar dessert, but made with other fruits such as apples, pears, apricots or plums. Cacou, a specialty of Paray-le-Monial, is a similar regional dessert specifically made with unpitted Bigarreaux cherries. Far Breton is a dessert similar to clafoutis made with prunes. Similarly, Richard Olney offers a recipe for "The Perigord Pudding" (or flaugnarde) with raisins or currants plus prunes macerated in Cognac as the featured fruit studded in a baked batter.

== Ingredients, preparation and serving ==
A pourable batter, similar in thickness to a pancake batter, is made from flour, eggs, milk, sugar, and salt and sometimes other ingredients such as almond flour, yogurt, and flavourings like vanilla or kirsch or other fruit brandies. The batter is poured over cherries or other fruit in a shallow baking dish and baked. Some recipes call for pouring the batter into the pan and topping with the fruit before baking. The finished product has a light, custardlike texture.

The dish is traditionally served as a dessert, but some less-sweet variations may also be appropriate as a breakfast or brunch dish. It can be served warm, at room temperature, or chilled. It may be served sprinkled with powdered sugar and may be served alone or with accompaniments such as cream, whipped cream, or ice cream.

== Cyanide ==
A traditional Limousin clafoutis contains both the flesh of the cherries and the nut-like kernels. Cherry kernels contain benzaldehyde, which gives the clafoutis a subtle almond flavour. They also contain a small amount of amygdalin, a cyanogenic glycoside – a compound potentially capable of releasing cyanide if consumed; but this is only released if the stones are crushed, and is non-toxic in small quantities.

== See also ==
- List of French dishes
- List of French desserts
