= Flaugnarde =

French dessert

- Course: Dessert
- Place of origin: France
- Serving temperature: Warm or cold
- Main ingredients: Batter, apples, peaches, pears, plums, prunes or other fruit; powdered sugar

Flaugnarde (pronounced [floɲaʁd]) also known as flagnarde, flognarde or flougnarde, is a baked French dessert with fruit arranged in a buttered dish and covered with a thick batter. Similar to a clafoutis, which is made with unpitted sour cherries, a flaugnarde is made with apples, peaches, pears, plums, prunes or other fruits. Resembling a sweet batter pudding or large pancake, the dish is dusted with confectioner's sugar and can be served either warm or cold.

== Origins ==
The name is derived from the Occitan words fleunhe and flaunhard, which both translate as "soft" or "downy". The dish is common in the Auvergne, Limousin and Périgord regions of France.

== See also ==
- Far Breton
- Pannenkoek, the large Dutch pancake that often includes fruits
