= Potato production in France =

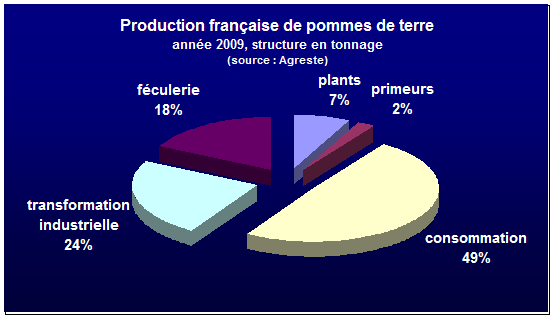
Production by product category (2009)

In 2009 the potato production in France covered an area of 164,000 hectares and produced 7.2 million tonnes, making it the world's tenth largest potato producer. The average yield was 43.8 tonnes per hectare. Potatoes account for a modest 0.9% of arable land in France (including French overseas departments), compared with 51.5% for cereals and 2% for industrial beet. Some 25,000 farmers are involved.

Since 1960 French potato production has fallen sharply, when it reached an all-time high of 14 million tonnes. At the same time, average yields have almost tripled.

This trend in production reflects that of consumption, which has declined in parallel, notably due to the potato's poor nutritional image. The consumption, estimated in 2007 at 65 kg per inhabitant per year, has also evolved, with fresh potatoes now accounting for only two-thirds of average consumption, the remainder being used in processed products, in particular frozen French fries, consumption of which has grown largely with the expansion of fast-food chains.

In the European Union, France, with 11% of the Community total, is the fourth largest potato producer behind Germany (10.7 Mt) and Poland (10.5 Mt), at roughly the same level as the Netherlands, and ahead of the United Kingdom. It is also Europe's third-largest exporter, behind the Netherlands and Germany, with 3 Mt, three-quarters of which are fresh potatoes exported mainly to Spain, Italy, Portugal and Belgium . Imports total 1.6 Mt, three-quarters of which are processed products.

The main production regions are located in the northern half of the country: Nord-Pas-de-Calais (38% of the French total), Picardie (23%), Champagne-Ardenne and Haute-Normandie. Most processing plants and starch factories are located in these regions.

== History ==
The potato, first discovered among the Incas in present-day Peru by the Spanish conquistadors around 1537, probably arrived in France towards the end of the 16th century. The first mention of its cultivation in France comes from the agronomist Olivier de Serres in his Théâtre d'Agriculture et mesnage des champs, which describes its cultivation and gives it as originating in Switzerland:

This shrub," says Cartoufle, "bears fruit of the same name, similar to truffles, & by some so called. It came from Switzerland to Dauphiné a short time ago.

The Swiss naturalist Gaspard Bauhin, in his Pinax theatri botanici published in 1623, mentions that the potato was cultivated in Burgundy.

While it had spread to Ireland, Flanders and Germany, for over two centuries the potato was used in much of France only for cattle feed.

In 1757, the potato was cultivated in Brittany, which was experiencing a famine. First in the Rennes region by Louis-René de Caradeuc de La Chalotais, soon followed in the Léon region by monseigneur de la Marche, nicknamed "l'évêque des patates" (eskob ar patatez). Jean-François Mustel, an agronomist from Rouen (author of a Mémoire sur les pommes de terre et sur le pain économique), encouraged potato cultivation in Normandy: in 1766, potatoes were grown in Alençon, Lisieux and the bay of Mont Saint-Michel.

In 1768, a certain Dottin, postmaster at Villers-Bretonneux, sent M. Dupleix, intendant of Picardie, an eight-page memoir on the cultivation and use of potatoes, a document preserved by the Archives départementales de la Somme. These trials were probably one of the factors that prompted Parmentier to launch his campaign in favor of potatoes.

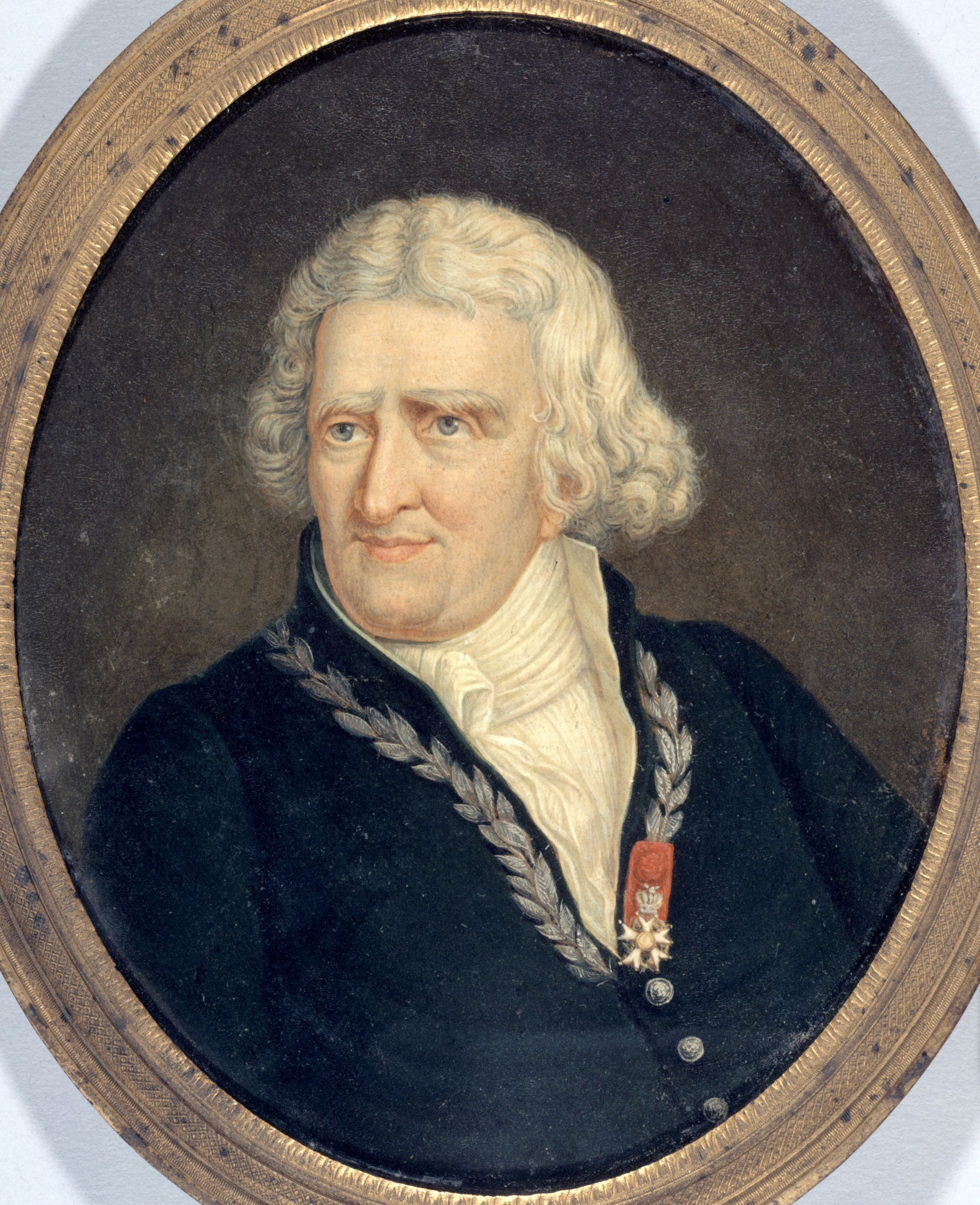
Portrait of Parmentier.

It was above all Antoine Parmentier who, on his return from captivity in Prussia, promoted the potato for human consumption and succeeded in developing its use in all strata of French society. Taken prisoner by the Prussians during the Seven Years' War (1756–1763), he had discovered the potato, the main food supplied to prisoners. Following a terrible food shortage in 1769, the Besançon academy launched a competition in 1771 on the following theme: "Indicate the plants that could replace those commonly used for human consumption in the event of a shortage, and how they should be prepared. Parmentier won first prize, ahead of other competitors who had also written a thesis on the potato, proof that its use was really on the agenda.

More than a century before Parmentier, thanks to Jean Bauhin (1541–1612), brother of Gaspard Bauhin and director of the "Grands-Jardin" in Montbéliard, the potato was used to alleviate the famine in the independent Comté de Montbéliard, which became French in 1793. That very year, "potatoes were considered so indispensable that a Commune decree dated 21 Ventôse ordered a census of luxury gardens to devote them to the cultivation of this vegetable; as a result, the grand allée of the Tuileries Garden and the flower beds were cultivated with potatoes, which for a long time gave them the nickname of royal oranges, in memory of the restoration that had made them so useful".

Subsequently, Parmentier succeeded in obtaining the support of the authorities to encourage the population to eat potatoes. In particular, he used a famous stratagem: he had a (light) guard posted around a potato field, giving local residents the impression that potatoes were a rare and expensive crop, destined only for the nobility. Some stole them, cooked them and enjoyed them. King Louis XVI congratulated him, saying: "One day, France will thank you for having invented bread for the poor". Their use in popular cuisine grew rapidly.

At the end of the 18th century, 45 km^{2} of France were devoted to potato cultivation. A century later, in 1892, this area had increased to 14,500 km2. Shortly before the French Revolution, the agronomist Jean Chanorier developed this crop on his land in Croissy-sur-Seine.

In France, on 25 Nivôse An II (13 January 1794), the Convention, faced with insufficient wheat requisitions and riots, passed the law on potato cultivation, which called for the widespread cultivation of potatoes throughout the country. Article 1 of this law stipulates that:

"The constituted authorities are required to use all means in their power in communes where potato cultivation has not yet been established, to encourage all farmers in these communes to plant a portion of their land with potatoes, according to their ability.

== Production trends and structure ==
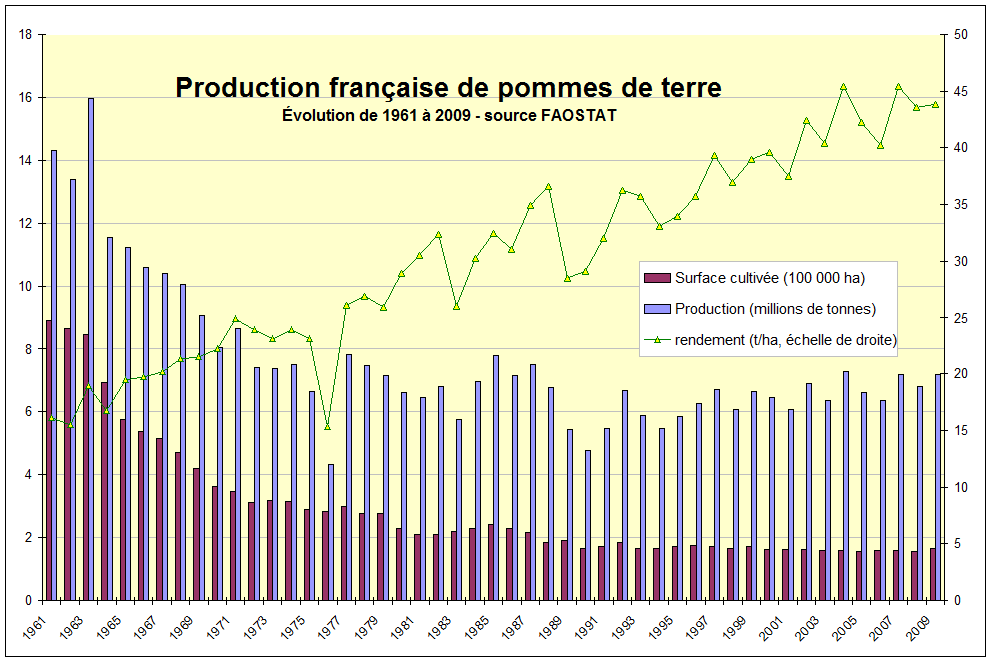
Trends in French potato production from 1961 to 2009.

French potato production has declined significantly over the last few decades. According to statistics published by the FAO, it fell from 14.3 million tonnes in 1961 to 7.16 Mt in 2009, practically halving. In fact, after reaching an all-time low of 4.33 Mt in 1976 (a year of severe summer drought during which the average yield was 15.3 t/ha, returning to its 1962 level), then 4.75 Mt in 1990 (two years of drought in 1990 and 1991 caused the average yield to fall), it has recovered slightly and stabilized since the early 1990s. Over the same period, the area sown to the crop fell by a factor of 5.4, from 890,000 to 164,000 hectares, while average yield increased by a factor of 2.7, from 16.1 to 43.8 tonnes per hectare.

This sharp increase in yield is due to a number of factors: new, more productive varieties, better-quality plants (elimination of viruses which considerably weakened production), better control of agronomic techniques (soil preparation, chemical weeding, development of irrigation, etc.), reduced storage losses (refrigeration, anti-sprouting treatments, etc.). It can also be partly explained by the concentration of production in the most fertile and favorable regions for this crop (Nord, Picardie, Champagne).

=== Geographical distribution of production ===
Geographical distribution of total potato production in 2009.

French potato production is heavily concentrated in the northern part of the country (Nord and Paris Basin), where most of the processing industry is also located. In 2009, the top three producing departments were Somme (1.5 Mt), Nord (1.2 Mt) and Pas-de-Calais (0.95 Mt), accounting for 51% of the national total. Seedling production is mainly located in coastal regions, in Brittany (Finistère) and Pas-de-Calais, while early fruit production is spread along the coast, from Pas-de-Calais to Landes via Finistère and Charente-Maritime, in the Centre region, as well as in southern regions (Pyrénées-Orientales).

== Varieties and geographical indications ==
=== Variety ===
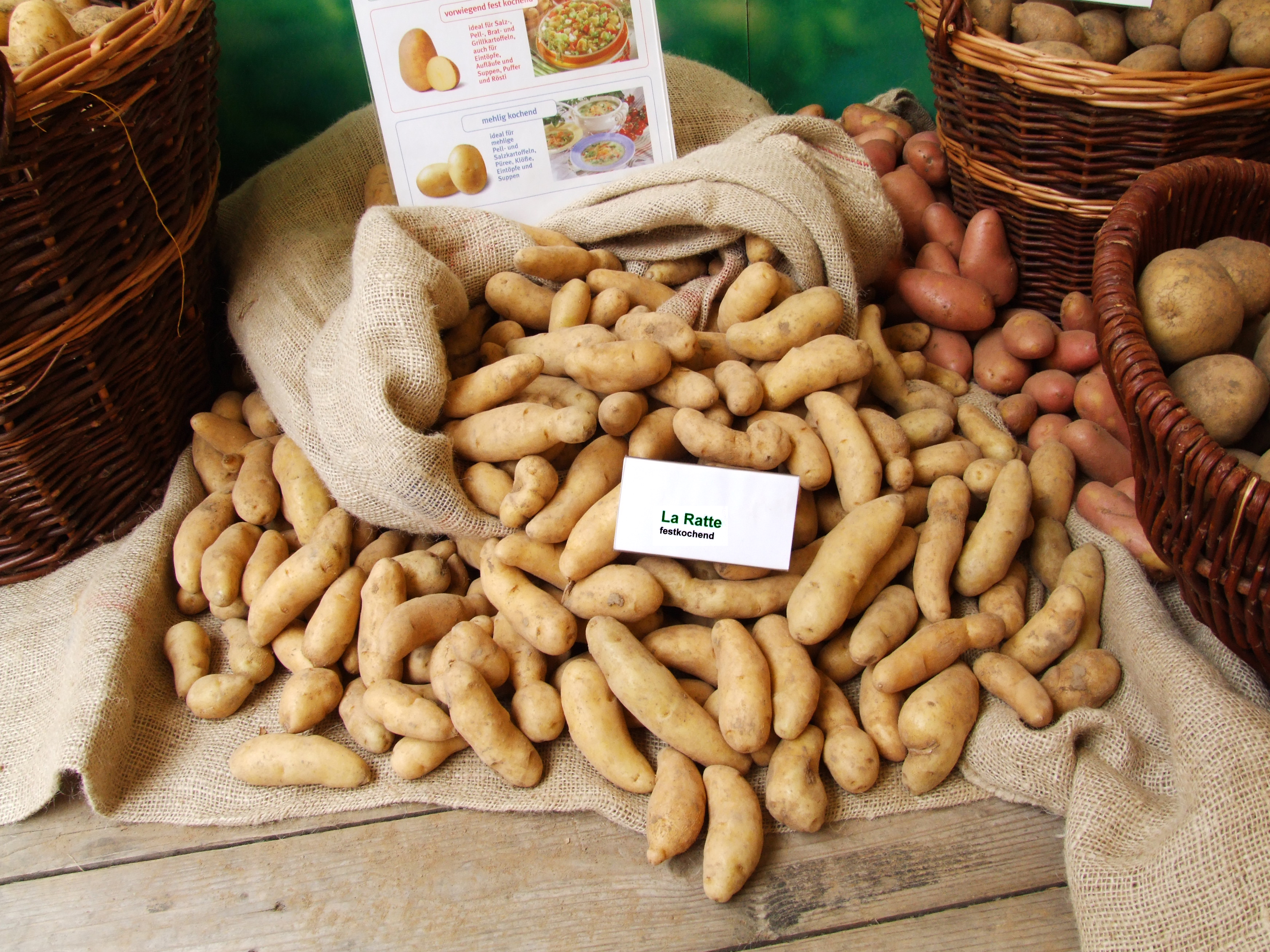
Ratte tubers.

Many potato varieties are grown in France. Around 200 varieties (compared with several thousand worldwide) are listed in the official catalog of plant species and varieties grown in France, but other varieties belonging to the Community catalog are also grown, as well as a few traditional varieties.

The official French catalog is managed by the Comité Technique Permanent de la Sélection (CTPS) and lists varieties that have passed the DUS (Distinction, Homogeneity, Stability) and VATE (Valeur Agronomique Technologique et Environnementale) tests, which are a prerequisite for marketing authorization, for lists A and B.

In 2009, the main varieties multiplied for the production of certified seedlings were the following: Spunta, Bintje, Charlotte, Agata, Kaptah Vandel, Monalisa, Amyla, Atlas, Kardal, Caesar, Amandine and Safrane.

Among the traditional varieties, some have come back into fashion in recent years, such as 'Ratte', 'Bonnotte de Noirmoutier' and 'Vitelotte'. Since the decree of 18 June 2012, six old varieties: 'Bleue d'Auvergne', 'Bonnotte de Noirmoutier', 'Early Rose', 'Fleur de pêcher', 'Rouge de Flandre' and 'Vitelotte noire', as well as 'Catarina' created in 1966, have been registered in the Official Catalogue as "conservation varieties" (list C) for a period of ten years. Their maintenance is ensured by the FNPPPT, the national federation of seed potato producers.

=== Indications of origin ===
Several local potato productions in France are distinguished by geographical indications which are either quality labels (AOC/AOP, IGP, Label Rouge) or trademarks.

The INAO lists the following appellations:

- Pomme de terre de l'île de Ré (AOC/AOP, 2000)
- Béa du Roussillon (AOC/AOP, 2006)
- Pommes de terre de Merville (IGP, 1996)
- Belle de Fontenay firm-fleshed potato (label rouge, 1999)
- Pomme de terre Manon spéciale frites (label rouge, 2009)
- Pompadour firm-fleshed potatoes (label rouge, 2001)
- Label rouge potato plants (label rouge, 1999)

== Potato industry ==
The potato industry comprises two sub-sectors: the extraction of potato starch and other products, and the production of processed food products in dehydrated, frozen or appetizer form.

=== Starch ===
Starch production in France has declined sharply since the 1950s and has become more concentrated. There are now just two plants, at Vecquemont in the Somme and Haussimont in the Marne, compared with 59 in 1952. The former belongs to the Roquette group, which specializes in starch extraction and also processes other sources such as corn, wheat and protein peas, while the latter was sold by the Dutch Avebe group, which wished to cease operations, to the Sphère company, associated with a group of producers, which is focusing on the production of biodegradable plastics.

Starch production is regulated at European level within the framework of the common organization of the starch market, which has set production quotas for each country. France has a starch quota of 265,354 tonnes, or 13.6% of the EU total. This quota is allocated by the French authorities as follows between the two starch plants: 63,258.85 tons for the Haussimont plant and 202,095.15 tons for the Vecquemont plant. Actual production is estimated at 252,000 tonnes for the 2009/2010 campaign, for a volume of potatoes delivered of 1.037 million tonnes.

=== Processed products ===
The potato processing industry is located mainly in the Nord-Pas-de-Calais, Picardie and Champagne-Ardenne regions. In the 2008/2009 season, it processed 1.07 million tonnes of potatoes, producing 533,174 tonnes of finished products, including 420,452 tonnes (79%) of frozen products. It is mainly operated by foreign groups, such as Farm Frites (Netherlands), Intersnack (Germany) and above all McCain Foods (Canada), which produces three-quarters of processed potato products in France.

This production is insufficient to satisfy domestic demand, and France imports over 600,000 tons of processed products, three-quarters of them frozen, mainly from Belgium and the Netherlands.

Main companies involved in potato processing in France :

- McCain Foods, French fries and other frozen fillings, flakes and dehydrated purée, three plants located in Béthune and Harnes (Pas-de-Calais), and in Matougues (Marne). Harnes is the Canadian group's first site in France, and the headquarters of its French subsidiary. Béthune, a former Beaumarais plant acquired in 1986, also produces dehydrated products. Matougues, commissioned in 2001, is the world's largest production unit for frozen French fries, capable of producing 25 tonnes per hour.
- Farm Frites, frozen French fries, Dutch group based in Montigny-le-Roi (Haute-Marne) since the purchase of the Lesudeba plant from the Unilever group in 1996.
- Intersnack France, potato chips (Vico brand), Vic-sur-Aisne (Aisne) plant, taken over in 1998.
- Nestlé, (Mousline brand), plant at Rosières-en-Santerre (Somme).
- Altho, chips (Brets brand), plant at Saint-Gérand (Morbihan).
- Sibell, potato chips, La Ciotat (Bouches-du-Rhône).
- Lunor, vacuum-packed potatoes and other cooked vegetables (5th range), cooperative group, three plants in Luneray (Seine-Maritime), Plancy-l'Abbaye (Aube).
- Ghisetti 1870 France, vacuum-packed potatoes and other cooked vegetables (5th range), Italian group, plant at Le Chêne (Aube).
- The Flodor potato chip factory in Péronne (Somme) was liquidated in 2005 by the Italian group Unichips, which had bought it in 1990. This group continues to market products under the "Flodor" brand.
- Terr'Loire in Chécy (Loiret), vacuum-packed potatoes and other vegetables (5th range), was taken over in 2009 by the Agralys group.

== Professional organizations and institutions ==
Potato growers are grouped within the Union nationale des producteurs de pommes de terre (UNPT), which was formed in 2002 from the merger of two pre-existing organizations: fédération nationale des producteurs de pommes de terre industrielles (FNPTI) and fédération nationale des pommes de terre de consommation (FNPTC).

In the processing sector, all the professional organizations in the potato industry are united in the Groupement interprofessionnel pour la valorisation de la pomme de terre (GIPT). This brings together the professional unions of producers and the two industrial branches (starch and processed products):

- The National Union of Potato Producers (UNPT),
- The National Federation of Potato Processors (FNTPT),
- The National Professional Chamber of Potato Starch Producers (CSF)

In the French ware potato sector, the Comité national interprofessionnel de la pomme de terre (CNIPT) brings together the professional organizations of the various stakeholder groups: producers, cooperatives, distributors, brokers and retailers:

- Union nationale des producteurs de pommes de terre (UNPT),
- Fédération française de la coopération fruitière légumière et horticole (FELCOOP),
- Fédération française des syndicats de négociants en pommes de terre et légumes en gros (FEDEPOM)),
- Syndicat national des courtiers en pommes de terre et fruits et légumes (SNCPT),
- Fédération du Commerce et de la Distribution (FCD),
- Union nationale des syndicats de détaillants en fruits et légumes (UNFD)

The Fédération nationale des producteurs de semences de pommes de terre (FN3PT) brings together all those involved in the breeding and production of certified seed potatoes. These growers and grower unions are organized into three "Établissements producteurs régionaux" (EPR): Bretagne-Plants, Comité Nord and Grocep (Groupement du Centre des producteurs de plants de pomme de terre). "France Obtention" is an organization created by the FN3PT to develop institutional or professional partnerships abroad (mainly in North Africa and the Middle East) to promote French seed potatoes.

The Association des créateurs de variétés nouvelles de pomme de terre (ACVNPT) brings together the four French breeders: Bretagne Plants, Grocep and Comité Nord, as well as Germicopa, a private seed company based in Brittany and specialized in potatoes (research station at Châteauneuf-du-Faou, Finistère).

== Consumption evolution ==
The potato is the most widely consumed vegetable in France, but its consumption has been falling steadily for many years. Average annual consumption was 152.7 kg per capita in 1950, 95.6 kg in 1970, 68.5 kg in 2008,38 and 50 kg in 2016, of which around 20 to 25 kg was fresh (purchases, garden production, catering).

Within this total, the share of processed products, which are developing especially in out-of-home consumption (fast food, company restaurants), is tending to increase at the expense of fresh potatoes. These figures are slightly underestimated, as they do not take into account self-consumption by farmers and individuals with home gardens, estimated at between 400,000 and 500,000 tonnes per year.

Analyses carried out in the 1999–2001 period as part of the monitoring plan for residues of phytosanitary products on potatoes showed that 92.3% of cases (out of 1,417 analyses involving 340 samples) were below the analytical limits of quantification (LOQ) and 99.3% below the maximum residue limits (MRL). Analyses exceeding the MRL (ten cases, or 0.7% of the total) concerned the following active substances: dimetomorph (1 case), dithiocarbamates (4), oxadixyl (4) and aclonifen (1). Among these substances, oxadixyl is a fungicide withdrawn from the market at the end of 2003.

In France, the marketing of early and ware potatoes for fresh sale is subject to the decree of 3 March 1997, which imposes a certain number of rules. Potatoes must belong to varieties registered in the official French catalog of varieties or in the common Community catalog (excluding starch varieties, considered unfit for consumption). The nature of the potatoes must be indicated (early or new potatoes, consumption or firm-fleshed consumption), as well as the name of the variety, as these elements can justify significant price variations. The decree sets minimum sizes (17 mm for "grenaille", 28 mm for early potatoes and 35 mm for ware potatoes). It also establishes two quality classes, I and II, for which it specifies acceptable defect limits

== Gastronomy ==
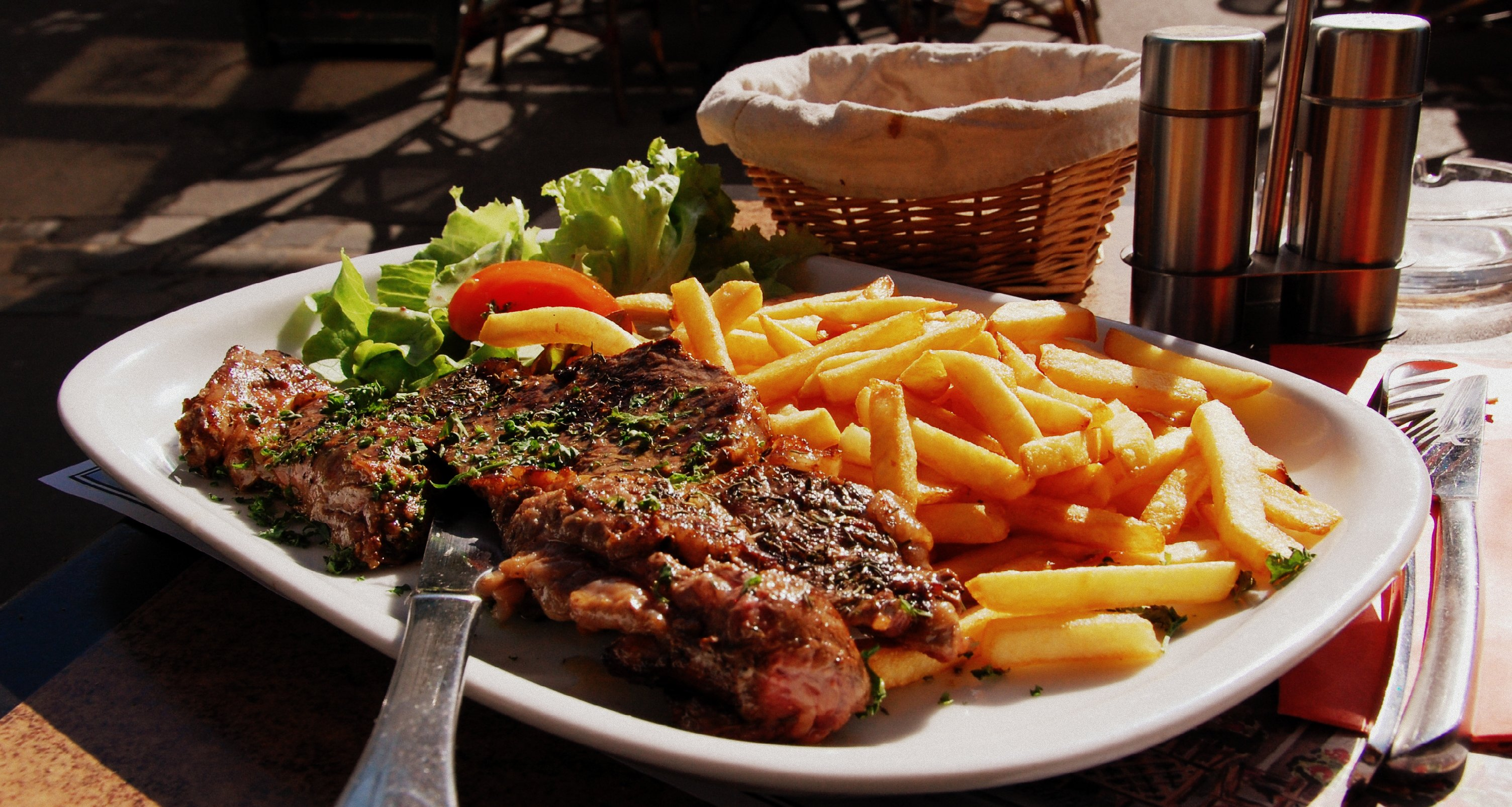
Steak frites are one of the symbols of French culinary identity.

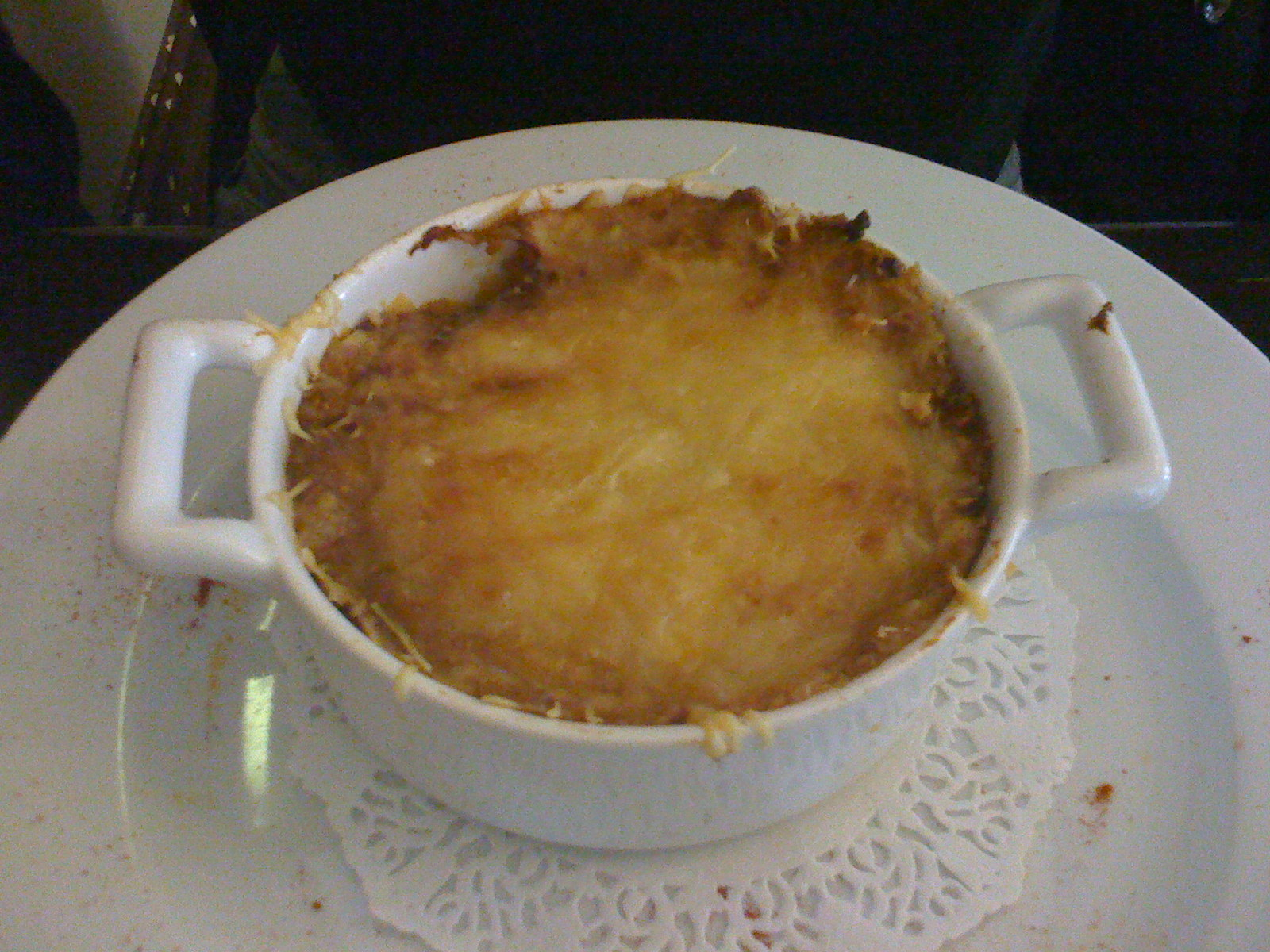
Hachis parmentier

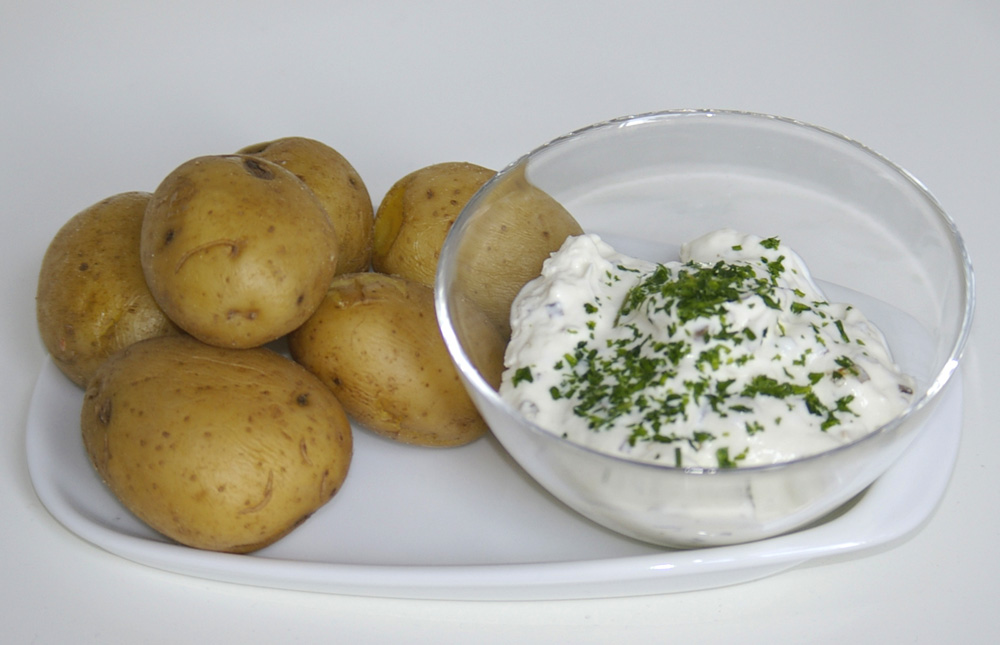
Pommes de terre en robe des champs et fromage blanc.

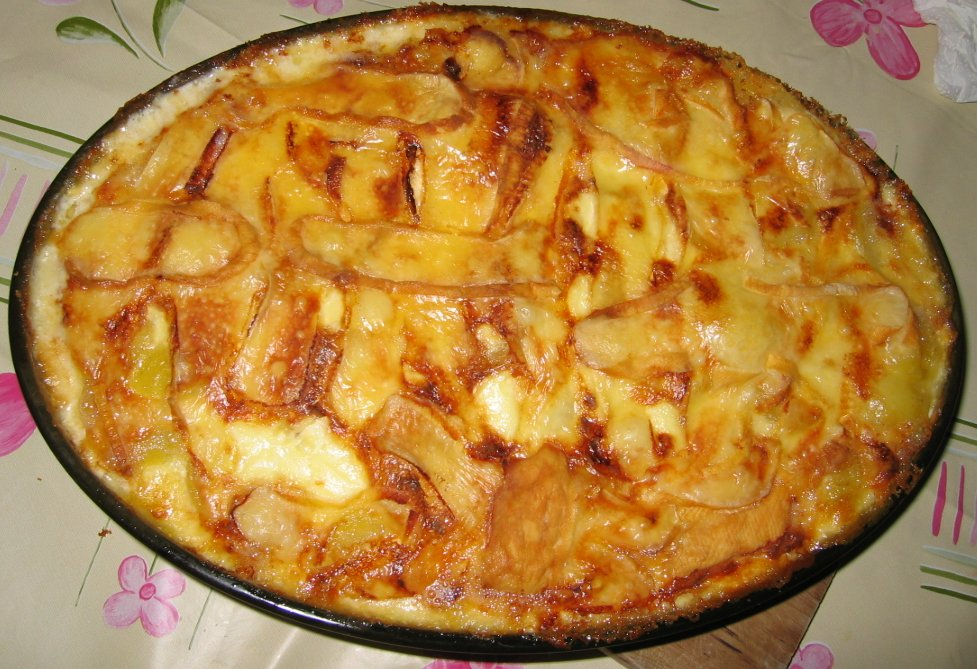
Tartiflette.

A few French specialities made with potatoes or with potatoes as the usual accompaniment:

- aligot, mashed potatoes and fresh tomme (Aubrac)
- baeckeoffe, meat dish simmered with potatoes and vegetables (Alsace)
- potato doughnut, grated potatoes, fried (Savoie)
- crêpes vonnassiennes, small pan-fried pancakes made from mashed potatoes (Ain)
- crique (cuisine), pan-fried grated potato pancake (Ardèche)
- farcement, traditional Savoyard dish made with grated potatoes, bacon, prunes and raisins (Savoie)
- farinade, a kind of thick pancake made with rye flour and grated potatoes (Auvergne)
- farcidure, boiled potato bread (Corrèze)
- frites, potatoes cut into sticks and fried in oil;
- potato pancake, grated potatoes shaped into patties and baked or fried
- potato waffle, waffles made with grated potato dough (also sold in frozen form)
- gratin dauphinois, gratin of sliced potatoes and crème fraîche (Dauphiné)
- gratin savoyard, variant of gratin dauphinois, with cheese (Savoie)
- hachis parmentier (Corrèze)
- Toupinel eggs, poached eggs served in baked potatoes cooked in their skins (Paris)
- potato bread, bread made by substituting potatoes for part of the flour
- Pâté aux pommes de terre
- péla, potato and reblochon gratin (Savoie)
- pfloutes, wheat and potato semolina dumplings (Alsace)
- pommes dauphine, fried dumplings of mashed potatoes and savory choux pastry
- pommes duchesse, mashed potato and egg preparation
- pommes Anna, potato gratin with lots of butter
- pomme de terre au four, oven-baked potatoes with their skins on
- pomme de terre en robe des champs, potatoes cooked in water or in the oven and served with their skins on;
- hash browns
- pommes soufflées, thinly sliced potatoes fried twice (France)
- mashed potatoes, a mixture of cooked, mashed potatoes mixed with butter and milk
- potato salad
- potato sausage (Kartoffelwurst), pre-cooked sausage made from meat, bacon and potatoes (Alsace)
- steak frites, steak with French fries
- tartiflette, potato and reblochon gratin (Savoy)
- tourte berrichonne, potato and onion pie with herbs and crème fraîche, originally from Berry (France)
- truffade, traditional Auvergne dish made with potatoes and fresh Cantal tomme (Auvergne)
- vichyssoise, a thick soup of mashed potatoes and leeks.

== See also ==
- Potato
- Antoine-Augustin Parmentier

== Bibliography ==
- Rousselle, Patrick; Robert, Yvon; Crosnier, Jean-Claude (1996). et, La pomme de terre : Production, amélioration, ennemis et maladies, utilisations. Paris: INRA éditions – ITPT – ITCF. ISBN 2-7380-0676-0.
- Bourget, Dorothée (1998). Le grand livre des variétés de pommes de terre. Paris. ISBN 2-9513185-0-2.
- Variétés de pommes de terre produites en France : Catalogue 2008. Paris: Lavoisier. 2008. ISBN 978-2-7562-0286-0.

=== External links ===
- Le plant français de pomme de terre
