= Patranque =

French rural dish

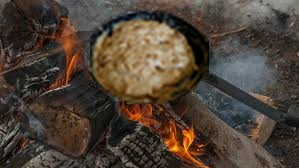
- Patranque cooked on a wood fire
- Place of origin: France
- Region or state: Auvergne
- Main ingredients: Tome fraîche or Cantal cheese, milk, butter, bread.

Patranque (Occitan: Patranchus) is a rural dish from Auvergne in France made by soaking stale bread in milk and tome fraîche (which is very different from actual tomme cheese: the recipe will fail if tomme cheese is used, since that melts in a very different way) or young Cantal cheese.

== Recipe ==
Chop the stale bread or cut it into cubes into a hollow dish. Pour the milk over it and let it soak. Cut the Cantal cheese into thin cubes, as finely as possible, and set aside. Drain the bread, then press it into a colander to remove the milk. Heat the butter in a large, thick-bottomed skillet. As soon as it starts foaming, add the bread crumb and stir with a wooden spatula to soak up melted butter. Then add the cheese gradually without ceasing to stir. Continue the operation on medium heat, while the cheese starts to melt. Season with pepper, salt, onions and garlic. Halfway through cooking, the patranque can be turned over like a large patty.

== Bibliography ==
- Guillemard, Colette (1980). Ethnocuisine de l'Auvergne (in French). Avallon: Civry. p. 152. ISBN 2-85983-019-7.
- Anglade, Jean; Soissons, Pierre (1996). Trésors de bouche (in French). Clermont-Ferrand: De Borée. ISBN 2-908592-54-1.

== See also ==
- Aligot
- Truffade
