= Toma cheese =

Italian cheese

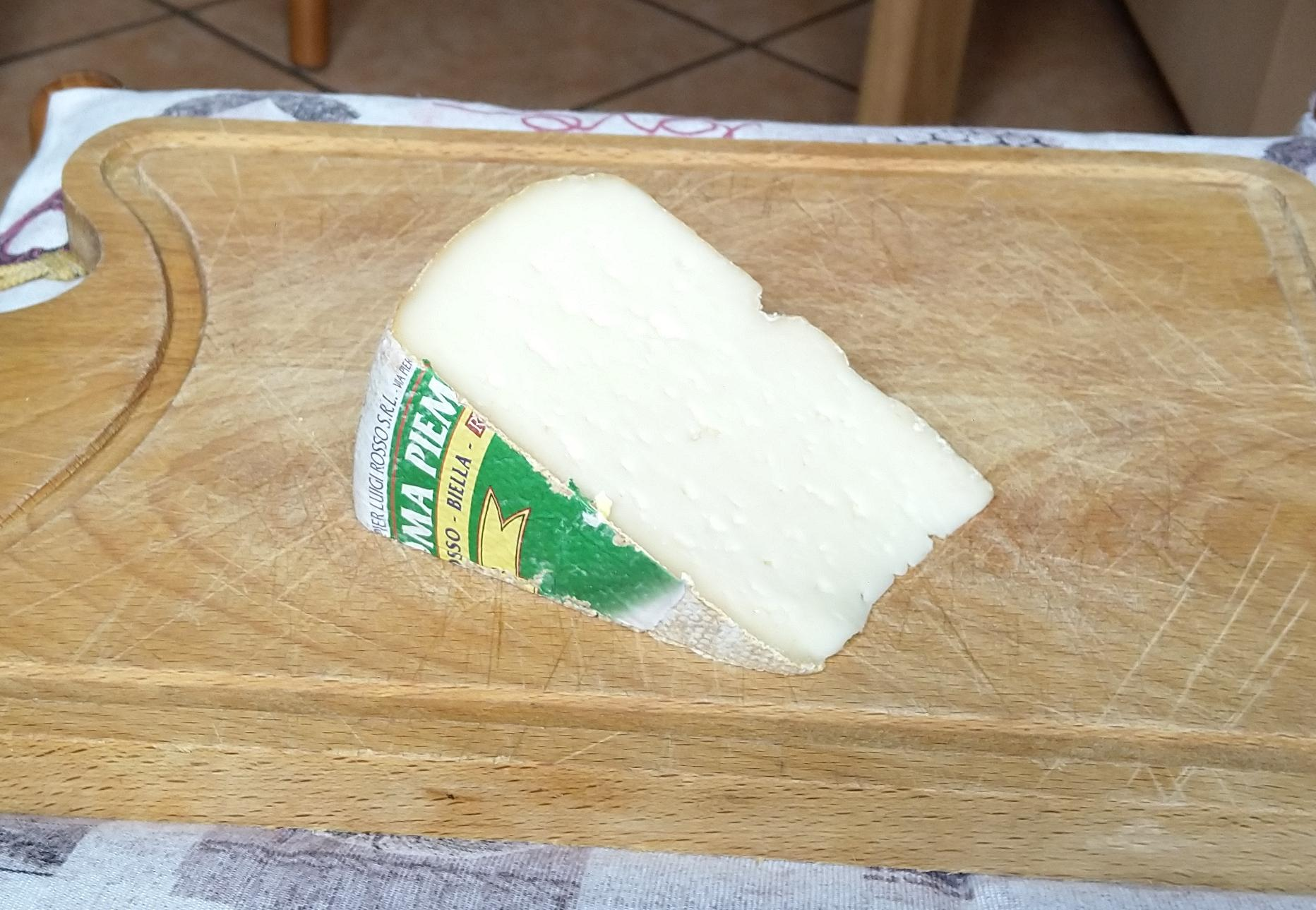
Toma piemontese DOP

Toma is a soft or semi-hard Italian cow's milk cheese, noted for its excellent melting qualities. It is made primarily in the Aosta Valley (it is one of the region's specialties) and Piedmont regions of Italy. Toma varies with region and locale of production, and is closely related to the French tomme.

The toma piemontese variety from Piedmont has protected designation of origin (PDO) status under EU legislation, while the toma di Gressoney or tomme de Gressoney (French), produced in the Gressoney Valley, is officially recognized as a prodotto agroalimentare tradizionale (PAT) and is included in the Ark of Taste catalogue of heritage foods.

Toma is not very common in central and southern Italy, with Basilicata as the only main producer. Toma Lucana is also recognized as a prodotto agroalimentare tradizionale.

It can have a fat content of 45%–52%.

== See also ==
- List of Italian cheeses
- Tomme
