= Tome fraîche =

French cheese

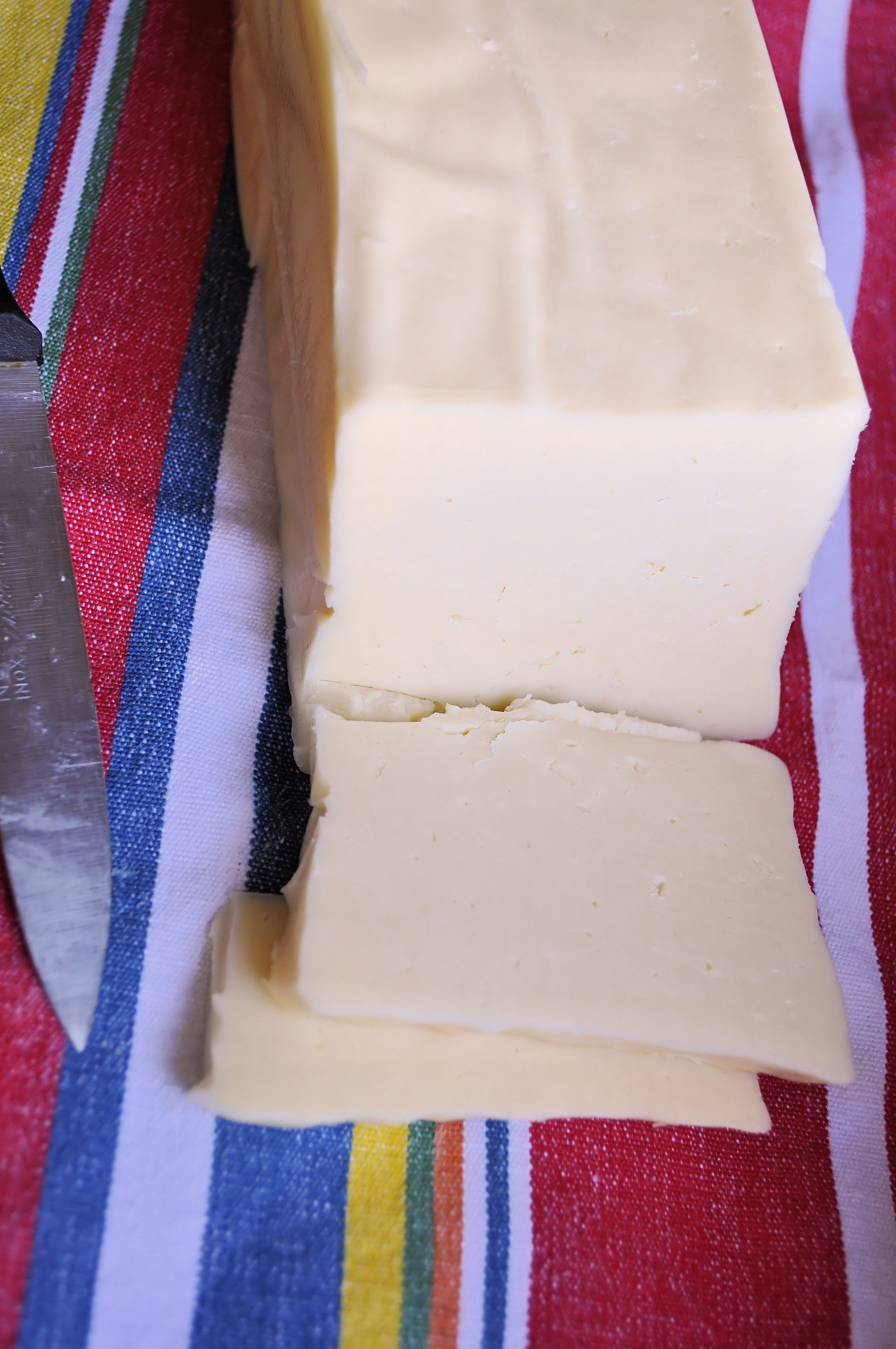
- Country of origin: France
- Source of milk: Cows
- Pasteurised: no
- Texture: Hard
- Named after: Aubrac

The Tome fraîche (Occitan: Toma fresca) or Tomme fraîche (Formatge tomme fresc) is a slightly fermented, unsalted, hard-pressed curd cheese based on cow's milk. It is traditionally produced in the region of Aubrac and Cantal in Haute-Auvergne (Massif central).

== History ==
Tome comes from the occitan word toma designating a fresh cheese. The French orthography used at the end of the 19th century to designate the fresh volume was tome and not tomme.

== In cooking ==
Typically, cooked in a fondue form. Traditionally used in aligot, truffade and patranque. Its milky taste, its slight acidity and its melting properties have extended its use to the making of gratins, vegetable pies, pizzas, etc.

== See also ==
- Aligot
- Auvergne
- Laguiole cheese
- Patranque
- Truffade
