= Tomme de Savoie =

Upland variety of Tomme cheese

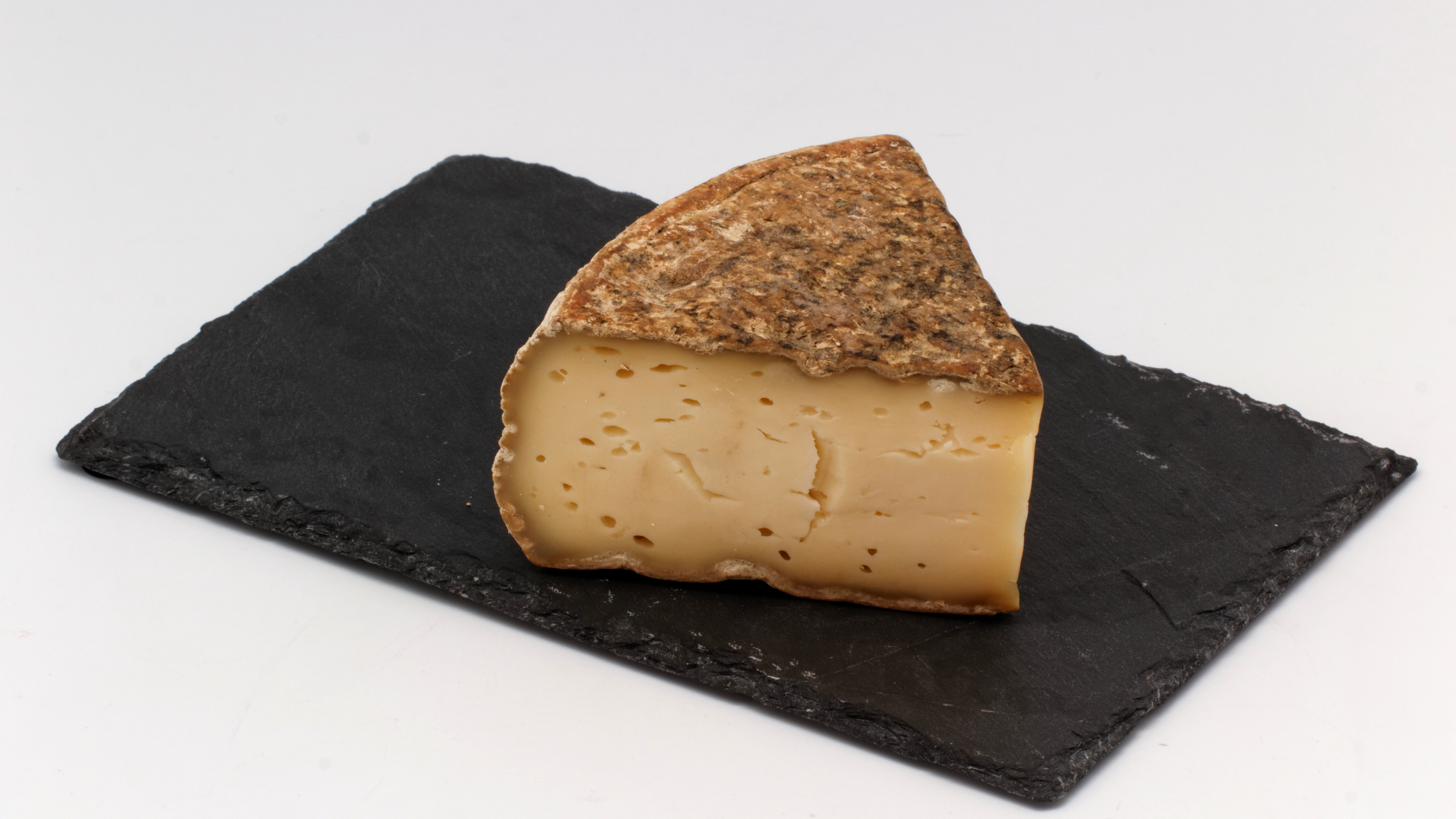
- Country of origin: France
- Region: Savoie
- Source of milk: Cows
- Pasteurized: No
- Texture: Semi-soft
- Aging time: 10 weeks
- Certification: PDO 1992

Tomme de Savoie (French pronunciation: [tɔm də savwa]) is an upland variety of tomme cheese, specifically, one from Savoy in the French Alps. It is a mild, semi-firm cow's milk cheese with a beige interior and a thick brownish-grey rind. Tomme de Savoie dates back to ancient history.

Tomme de Savoie, like most tommes, is usually made from the skimmed milk left over after the cream is used to make butter or richer cheeses. As a result, the cheese has a relatively low fat content (between 20 and 45%). The cheese is made year-round, and typically has a slightly different character depending on whether the cows are fed on winter hay or summer grass.

The cheese normally comes in discs approximately 18 cm (7 in) across, 5–8 cm (2–3 in) in thickness, and weighing between 1 and 2 kg (2 and 4 lb). It is first pressed, and then matured for several months in a traditional cellar, producing the characteristically thick rind and flavor.

== See also ==
- List of ancient dishes and foods
- List of cheeses
