= French Simmental =

Breed of cattle

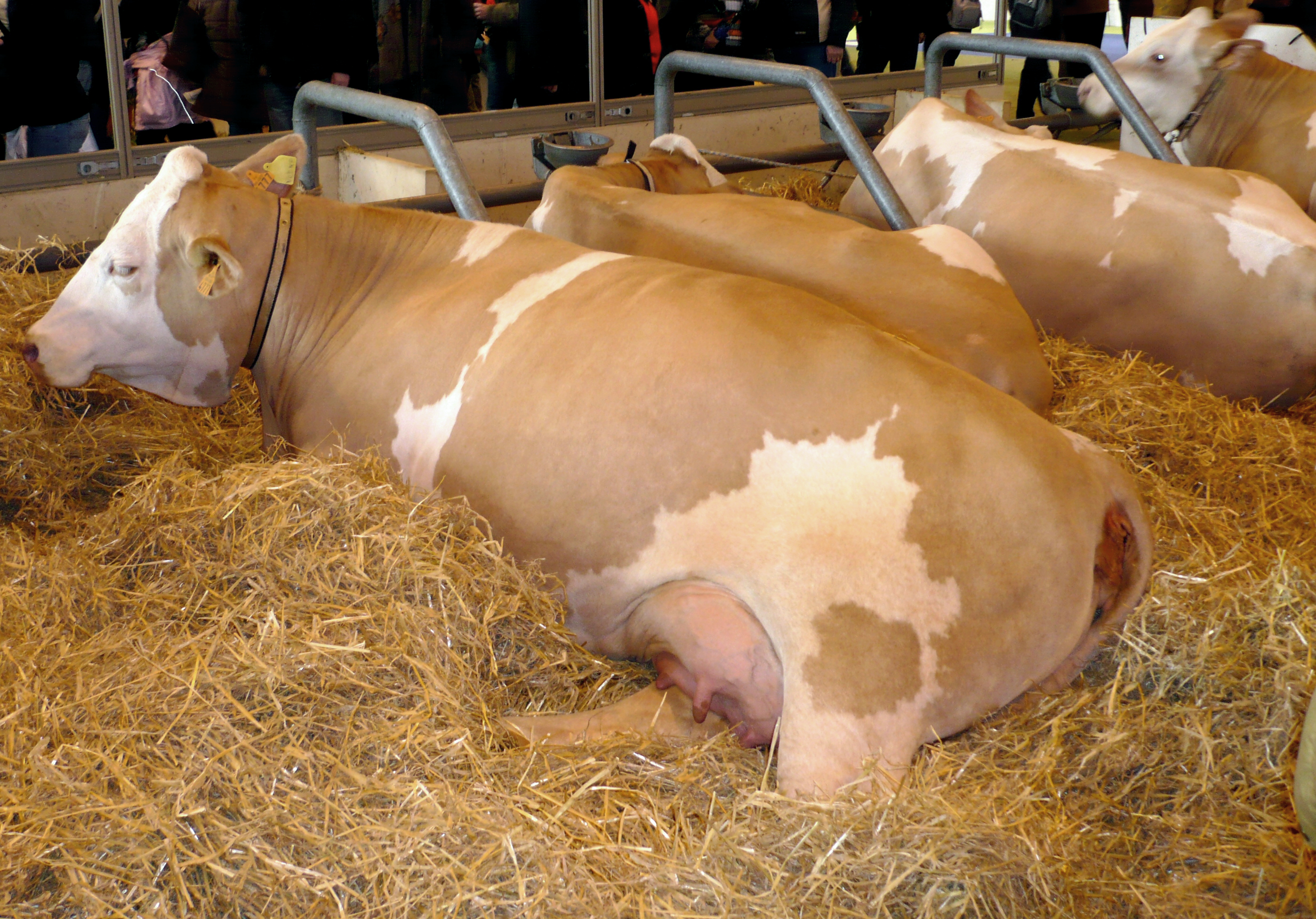
French simmental cows.

French Simmental is a French cattle breed.

== History ==
The breed originates from Simmental cattle from Switzerland. They were imported to France at the beginning of the 20th century. In 1930, the stud book was opened. The breed was named Eastern red pied. (in French, pie rouge de l'est).

During the 1970s, the French authorities tried to cross this breed with Montbeliard, but Montbeliard's breeders refused. French simmental are crossed with Fleckvieh cattle and Swiss Simmental. The breed is named French Simmental at this moment. First bred in Franche-Comté, the breed is now found in the Auvergne. There are about 35,000 cows.

== Morphology ==
The colour is red pied, with white head and legs. The red is a clear tan.

Mature cows weigh 700 kg at 140 cm tall. Mature bulls weigh 1,100 kg at 150 cm tall.

== Uses ==
They are used in both beef and milk production, but primarily for dairy. The cows give about 6,400 kg of milk every year. (4% fat and 3.3% of proteins) The milk is used for AOC cheeses, such as comté and laguiole. This breed is also used crossing with beef cattle such as charolais and limousin.

== See also ==
- List of breeds of cattle
- Cattle
