= Comté cheese =

French medium-hard Alpine cheese

Comté
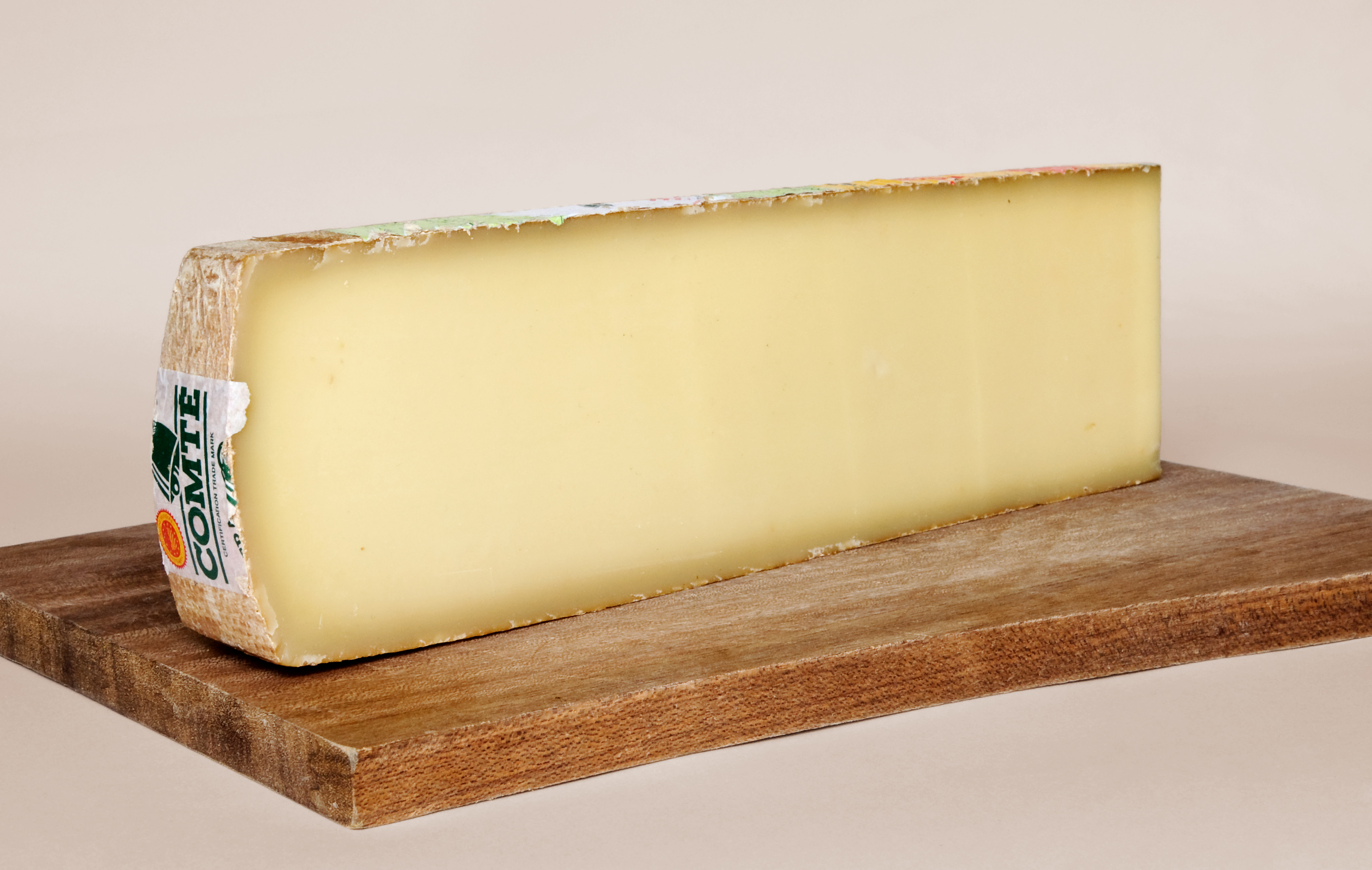
- Country of origin: France
- Region: Franche-Comté
- Source of milk: Cows
- Pasteurised: No
- Texture: semi-hard
- Aging time: 4–36 months
- Certification: Protected Designation of Origin (1996)

Comté (French pronunciation: [kɔ̃te]), also known as Gruyère de Comté, is a hard cheese made from unpasteurised cow's milk in eastern France. The production of Comté is the largest of the Protected designation of origin (PDO) cheeses made in France.

== History ==
Comté is based on artisanal techniques developed in the Jura Mountains 1,000 years ago. It is a cooked and pressed cheese made daily from raw cow's milk partially skimmed. It was manufactured seasonally and had to be kept for many months to ensure a source of food for the farmer's family throughout the cold season. The natural resources of pasture, water and firewood available in the Jura Mountains allowed the production and heating of the large quantity of milk (500 litres) required for manufacturing each wheel of Comté. The milk was collected from farms and made into cheese at co-operative dairies known as fruitières, of which there were eventually about 150 throughout the area. A traditional method of cheese-making involved the use of a large linen cloth. The cheesemakers used the cloth to collect the grains of curd – suspended in whey – from the vat; this method has largely disappeared.

France introduced the Appellation d'origine contrôlée (AOC) rules for cheese in the 1920s. Comté was awarded AOC status in 1958 The EU-wide Protected Designation of Origin (PDO) largely superseded the AOC in the 1990s; Comté received PDO status in 1996. In 2026, it is one of 46 French PDO cheeses.

=== Production ===
Comté has the highest production of all French PDO cheeses: 65,000 tonnes (72,000 short tons) annually. It is eaten by 40 per cent of the French population. The cheese is made in discs, or wheels, each between 40 and 70 cm (16 and 28 inches) in diameter, and around 9 and 13 cm (4 and 5 inches) in thickness. Each disc weighs up to 55 kg (121 lb) with a fat in dry matter (FDM) content around 45%. The rind is usually a dusty-brown colour, and the internal paste, pâte, is a pale creamy yellow. The texture is fairly hard but flexible, and the taste is mild, nutty, salty and slightly sweet.

Fresh from the farm, milk is poured into large copper vats where it is gently warmed. Each cheese requires up to 600 litres (160 US gal) of milk. Rennet is added, causing the milk to coagulate (curdle). The curds are cut into small white grains the size of rice or wheat, stirred, then heated again for around 30 minutes. The contents are then placed into moulds and the whey is pressed out. After several hours the mould is opened and left to mature in cellars, first for a few weeks at the dairy, and then over several months elsewhere.

The manufacture of Comté has been controlled by AOC regulations since it became one of the first cheeses to receive AOC recognition in 1958, with full regulations introduced in 1976. The AOC regulations for Comté prescribe:

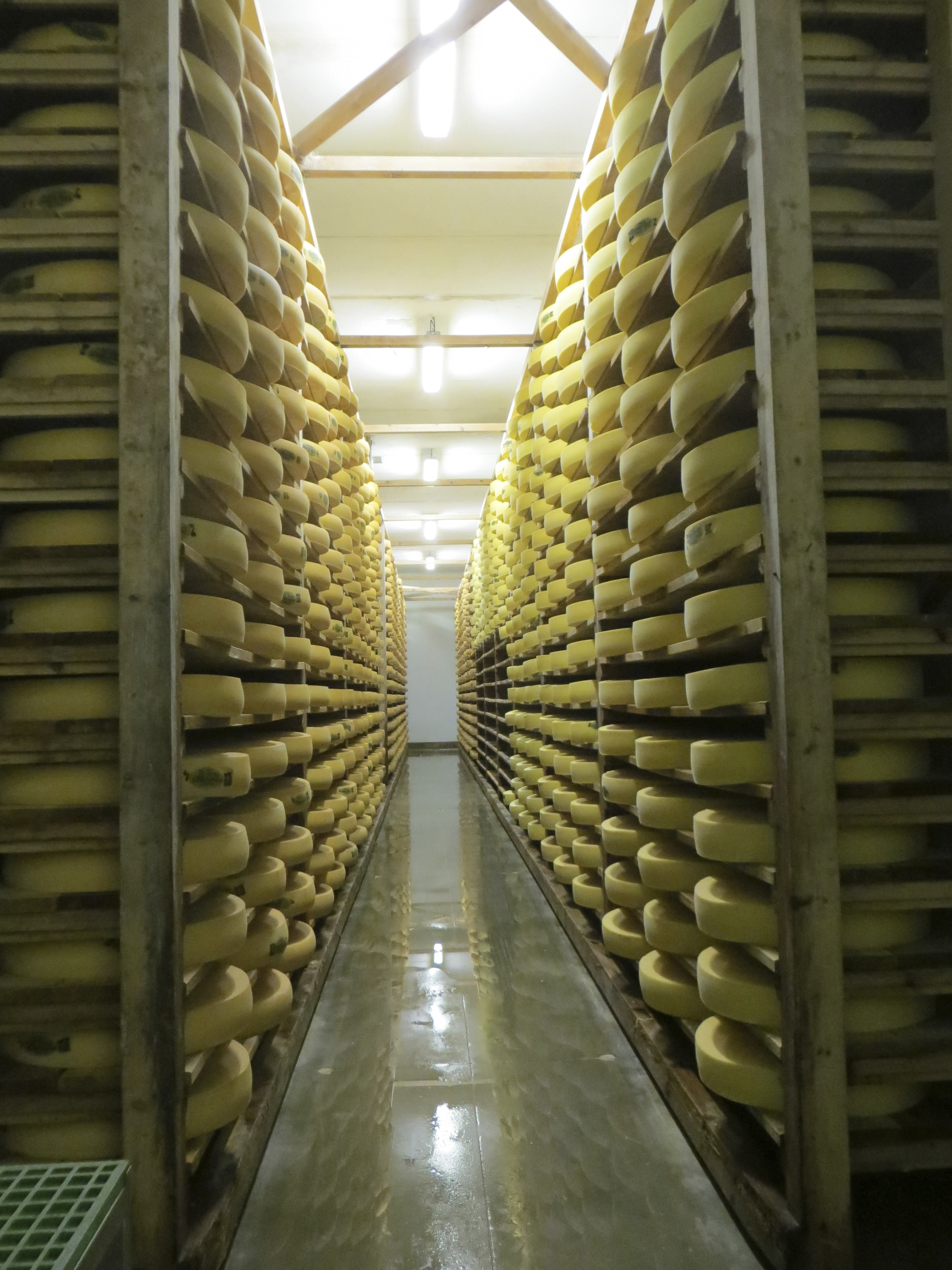
Wheels of comté cheese in storage, Burgundy, France

- Only milk from Montbéliarde or French Simmental cows (or cross breeds of the two) is permitted.
- There must be no more than 1.3 cows per hectare of pasture.
- Fertilisation of pasture is limited, and cows may only be fed fresh, natural feed, with no silage.
- The milk must be transported to the site of production immediately after milking.
- Renneting must be carried out within a stipulated time after milking, according to the storage temperature of the milk.
- The milk must be used raw. Only one heating of the milk may occur, and that must be during renneting. The milk may be heated up to 56 °C (133 °F).
- Salt may only be applied directly to the surface of the cheese.
- A casein label containing the date of production must be attached to the side of the cheese, and maturing must continue for at least four months.
- No grated cheese could be sold under the Comté name between 1979 and 2007.

In 2005, the French Government registered 175 producers and 188 affineurs (agers) in France. The growing number of cows raised to produce milk for this cheese has led to pollution entering waterways in the Ain, Doubs, and Jura departments, spurring debates on how to balance economics and culture with the environment.

== Grading ==
Each cheese is awarded a score out of 20 by inspectors: the highest possible scores are 1 point for overall appearance, 1.5 for quality of rind, 3.5 for internal appearance, 5 for texture, and 9 for taste. Those cheeses scoring higher than 14 points are given a green casein label with the logo of a green bell, and are called Comté Extra. Those cheeses scoring from 12 to 14 points are given a brown label and are called simply Comté. Any cheese scoring only 1 or 2 points for taste (out of the possible 9), or scoring below 12 overall, is prohibited from using the Comté name and is sold for other purposes.

== Jury terroir ==
Area in eastern France, centred on Franche-Comté, covered by the AOC/PDO designation

Comté is well known for its distinct terroir: it is made in 160 village-based fruitières (cheese-making facilities) in the region, owned by farmers who bring milk from their own cows; strict production rules linking place and product; and the seasonal environmental effects. Comté cheeses go through the process of "jury terroir", where panels of trained volunteer tasters from the Comté supply chain and from the region discuss and publish bi-monthly in the newsletter Les Nouvelles de Comté about the taste and their results. This jury terroir was created by Florence Bérodier, a food scientist, to elaborate in response to a set of formidable challenges that Comté cheese underwent in the beginning for its unfamiliar taste and smell. "The jury terroir is there to speak of all the richness in the tastes of a Comté", the original member confirmed. For Comté cheese to be world-renowned, the quality improved, but the challenge stood still to create a uniform taste, which was impossible to achieve since there were 160 different fruitières specialising in it. But through the process of jury terroir, people came to focus on communication among the tasters, which improved their ability to perceive and gained in value. They acquired a general culture that enabled them to describe and exchange the taste of Comtés. According to Pierre Androuët in his Guide du fromage (1983), "There is a world of difference between lowland Comté and mountain Comté. The original Comté and the lowland Comté may not differ much in appearance but there are variations in quality".

== Sources ==
- Androuët, Pierre (1983). Guide du fromage. Henley-on-Thames: Aidan Ellis. ISBN 9780856280078.
- Barthélemy, Roland (2004). Cheeses of the World. London: Hachette. ISBN 9781844301515.
- Masui, Kazuko; Joël Robuchon (1996). French Cheeses. London: Dorling Kindersley. ISBN 9780751303469.
- Papademas, Photis; Thomas Bintsis (2017). Global Cheesemaking Technology. Hoboken: Wiley. ISBN 9781119046158.

== See also ==
- List of cheeses
