= Cacasse à cul nu =

French potato and meat dish

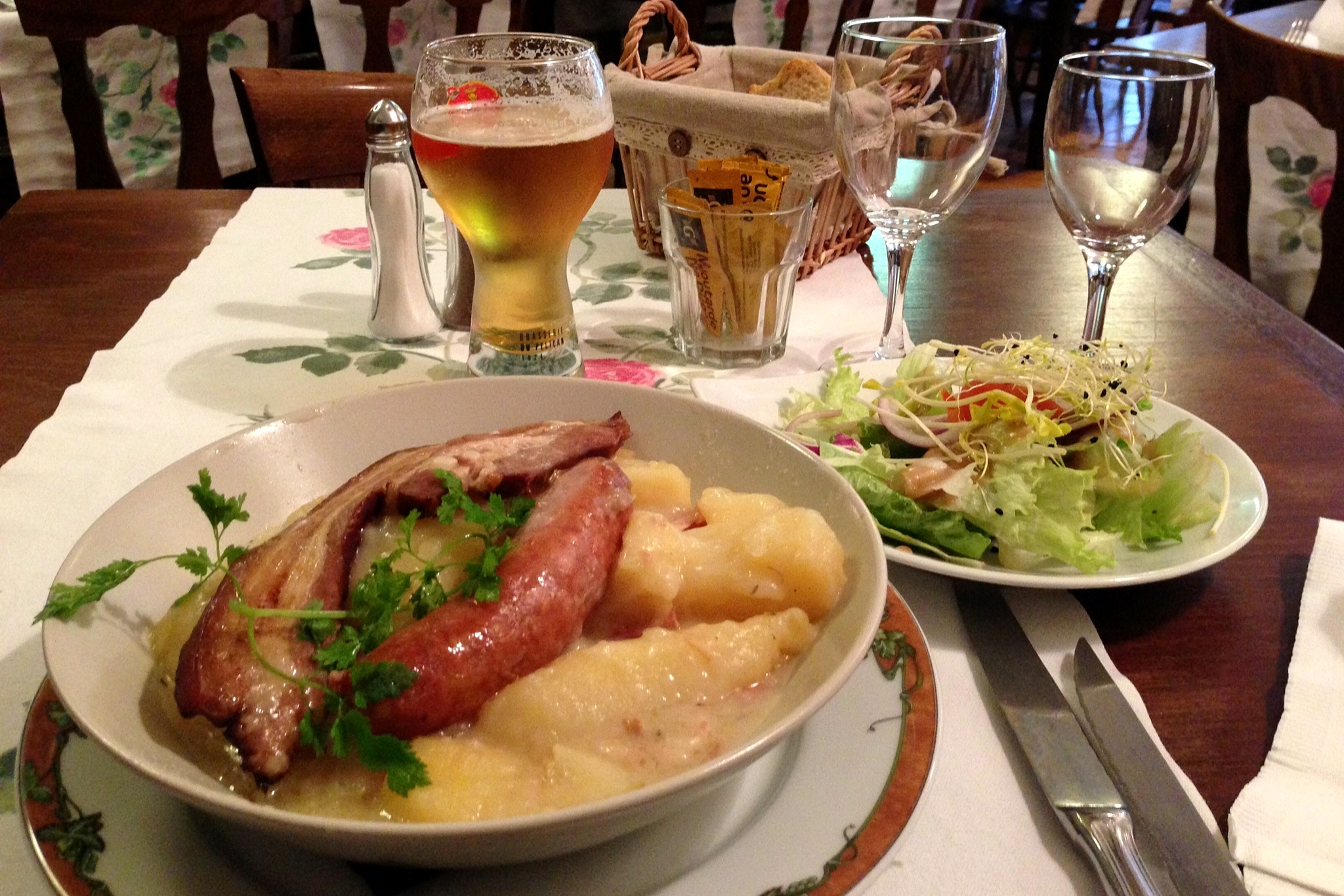
- Cacasse à cul culottée
- Course: Main course
- Place of origin: France
- Region or state: Ardennes
- Associated cuisine: France
- Main ingredients: potatoes, bacon, onions
- Similar dishes: Tartiflette, Bauernfrühstück

Cacasse à cul nu (transl. bare ass) is a dish originating from the Ardennes department of France. It is made in a Dutch oven with potatoes and onions, and is often served with bacon or smoked sausage. The dish was originally flavoured by rubbing the Dutch oven with bacon before cooking, but was not served with meat, hence the term "nu" (transl. nude). The terms culottée (transl. with underwear) or habillée (transl. dressed) are often included to indicate that the dish contains meat.

== History ==
There have not been any documents found that describe the exact place and date of origin of the dish, but it likely comes from the Meuse valley. It was a dish linked to a self-sufficient economy, where the villagers lived off their own agricultural resources.

The dish is mentioned in the work of Gérard Gayot, La Révolution en Ardenne, de l'Argonne au Namurois, during the years 1789–1792. In his work on the Ardennaise countryside in the 19th and 20th century, Jacques Lambert discusses "potée roussie", "roussade", or "potée à cul nu", also called "cacasse" or "frigousse": potatoes cooked with onions and lard.

Agnès Paris discusses the "cacasse" of the habitants of Bogny-sur-Meuse, reserved for days of opulence during the German occupation of France during the Second World War. Françoise Branget also mentions the dish in her book La Cuisine de la République.

== Description ==
The dish is a symbol of Ardennaise cuisine. It was originally a fricassee of potatoes and a roux, cooked in a cast-iron Dutch oven, that the most modest people consumed when meat was unaffordable.

"À cul nu" indicates the absence of meat, with bacon fat traditionally only being used to add flavour, while the bacon itself was not added to the dish.

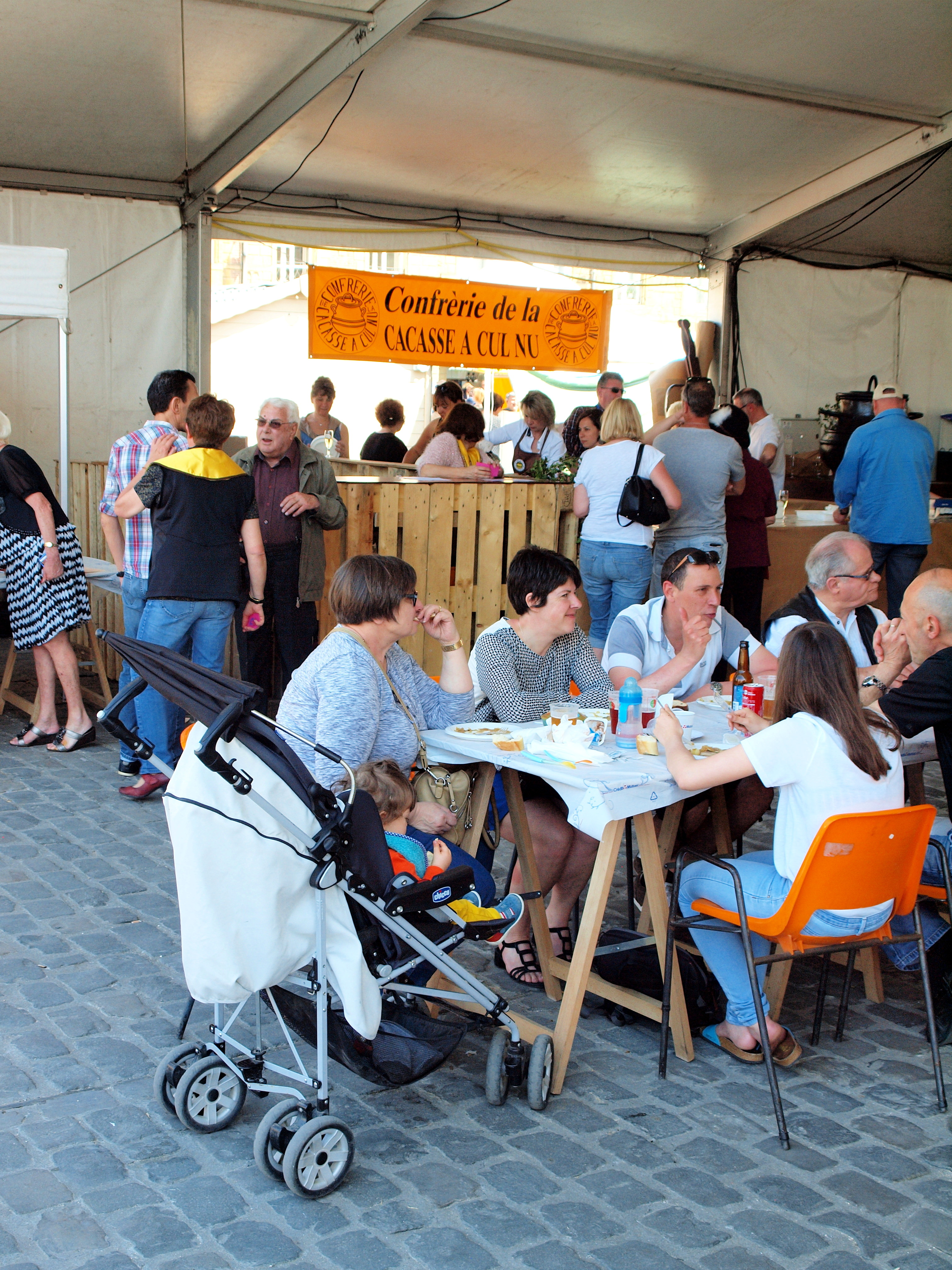
Stand at the "Confrèrie de la Cacasse à cul nu", during the 13th annual "Festival des Confréries" in the Ardennes, in Charleville-Mézières, in May 2016

Since 2001, the "Confrérie de la Cacasse à cul nu" updated the recipe by adding meat. The dish is now usually served with smoked sausage or slices of bacon.

== Bibliography ==
- Clerc, Jean (October 1985). Cuisine pauvre, pauvres nourritures (in French). pp. 46–53. ISSN 0758-3028.
- Lambert, Jacques (1988). "L'alimentation". Campagnes et paysans des Ardennes : 1830-1914 (in French). Éditions Terres Ardennaises. pp. 307–352.
- Claeys-Pergament, Sophie (12 March 2008). Terroir, la cacasse à cul nu se culotte (in French). lunion2008.
- Coutant, Catherine; Schmidt, François (2010). Atlas du patrimoine gastronomique de Champagne-Ardenne (in French). Éditions de l'Effervescence. ISBN 9782952538657.
- G.-M., G. (8 February 2011). Toute la confrérie au labo pour mitonner la cacasse (in French). lunion2011.
- Branget, Françoise (2011). La Cuisine de la République : cuisinez avec vos députés ! (in French). Le Cherche midi. ISBN 978-2-7491-1613-6.
- Rédaction FR3 (13 November 2012). La cacasse à cul nu des Ardennes ou le ragout à la bonne femme (in French). fr32012.
