= Truffade =

Rural French dish made with potatoes and curd

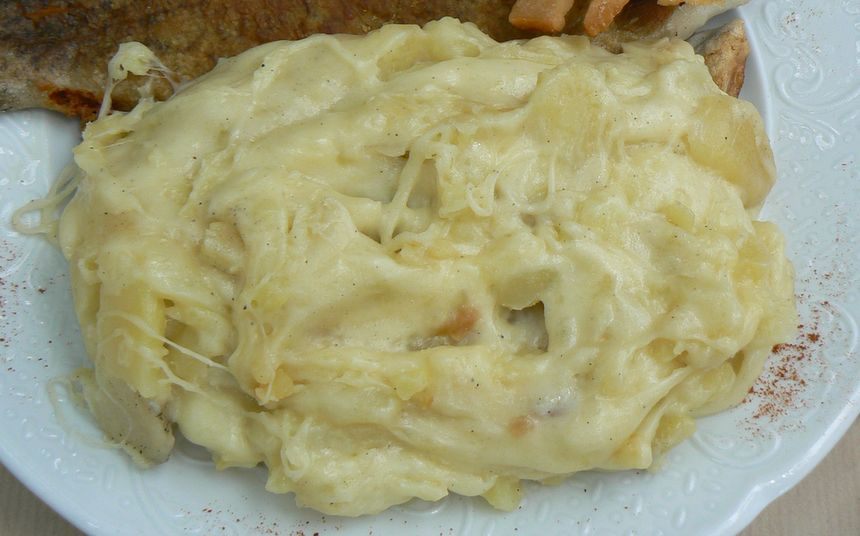
- Place of origin: France
- Region or state: Auvergne
- Main ingredients: Tomme fraîche, potatoes, goose fat

Truffade is a rural dish traditionally associated with Auvergne in France. It is a thick pancake made with thinly sliced potatoes that are slowly cooked in goose fat until tender, then mixed with thin strips of tomme fraîche (which is different from actual tomme cheese, which melts differently and will cause the recipe to fail). This mixture is stirred until it sticks together in a thick pastry, which is sometimes decorated with fresh parsley and may be served with a simple green salad.

Sometimes the truffade is flipped over to brown the other side, or lardons are added to it.

== See also ==
- Aligot
- Pachade
- Patranque
