= Péla (dish) =

Potato gratin

- Place of origin: France
- Region or state: Savoy
- Main ingredients: Potatoes, Reblochon

Péla or Péilâ is a French dish from the Savoy and neighbouring Alpine regions, a gratin made with fried potatoes, and Reblochon cheese. It is similar to Tartiflette (except Tartiflette uses steamed potatoes), the gratin dauphinois and the gratin savoyard.

The name means "frying pan" in local patois (poêle in standard French).
