= Tartiflette =

French baked potato dish

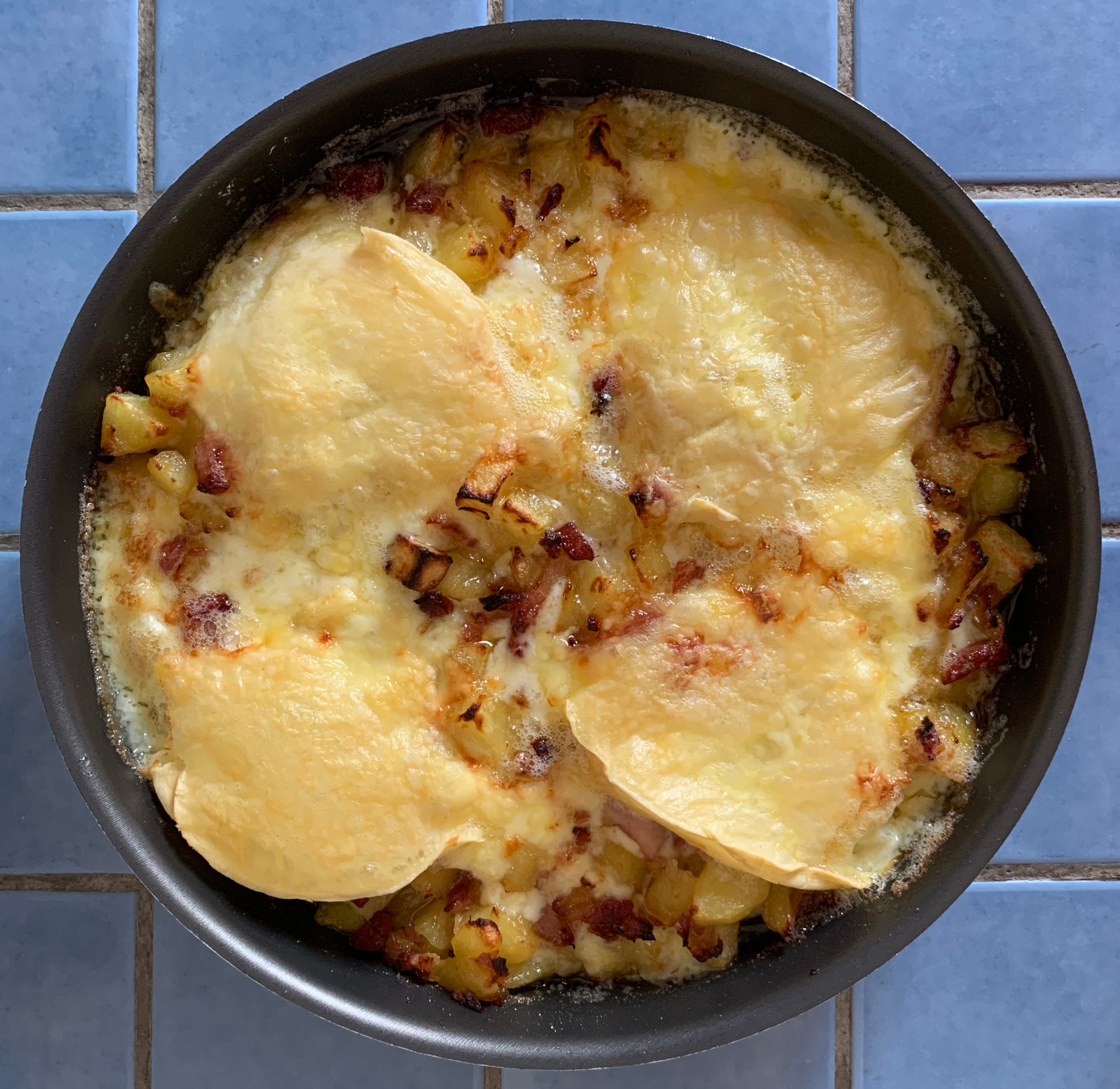
- Place of origin: France
- Region or state: Savoy
- Main ingredients: Potatoes, reblochon, lardons, onions
- Variations: Croziflette
- Similar dishes: Cacasse à cul nu

Tartiflette (French pronunciation: [taʁtiflɛt]) is a dish from Savoy in the French Alps. It is made with potatoes, reblochon cheese, lardons and onions. A splash of white wine can be added too.

The word tartiflette is probably derived from the Arpitan word for potato (tartiflâ) or from the Savoyard tartifles, a term also found in Provençal and Gallo-Italian. This modern recipe was inspired by a traditional dish called péla: a gratin cooked in a long-handled pan.

Often served as an après-ski meal, tartiflette conveys an image of Alpine authenticity and conviviality.

== History ==
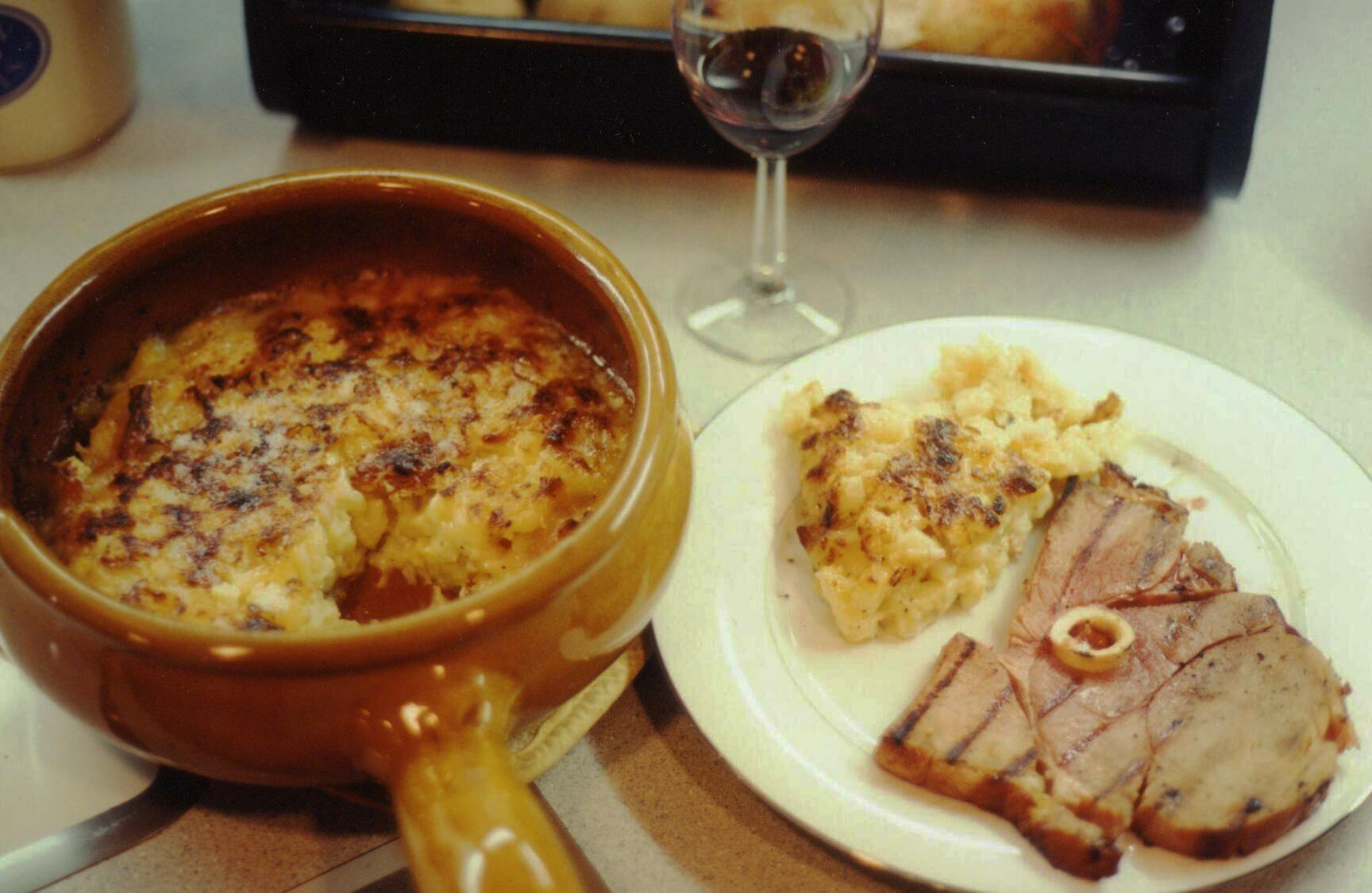
A cooked tartiflette and grilled ham

As with many traditional dishes in the region, the potato is a staple ingredient. Savoy was historically part of the Holy Roman Empire, and the Savoyards were exposed to potato tubers earlier than the French. Tartiflette was first mentioned in a 1705 book, Le Cuisinier Royal et Bourgeois, written by François Massialot and his assistant cook B. Mathieu.

In its modern form, tartiflette began to appear on the menus of restaurants in the ski resorts in the 1980s. Its popularity is partly thanks to the promotional effort by Le Syndicat Interprofessionnel du Reblochon to boost the sales of reblochon, as is confirmed also by Christian Millau (of the Gault-Millau Guide) in his gastronomic dictionary.

== Variations ==
A common related dish found throughout the region is the croziflette. Its preparation resembles that of the original dish in everything but the use of potatoes, in place of which minuscule squares of locally produced pasta are used. These are known as crozets de Savoie (which are usually made from buckwheat, but sometimes durum), hence the name of this dish, which is a blend of "crozet" and "tartiflette".

Another related dish is the morbiflette prepared with the Morbier cheese in place of the Reblochon.
