= Tomme =

Type of cheese

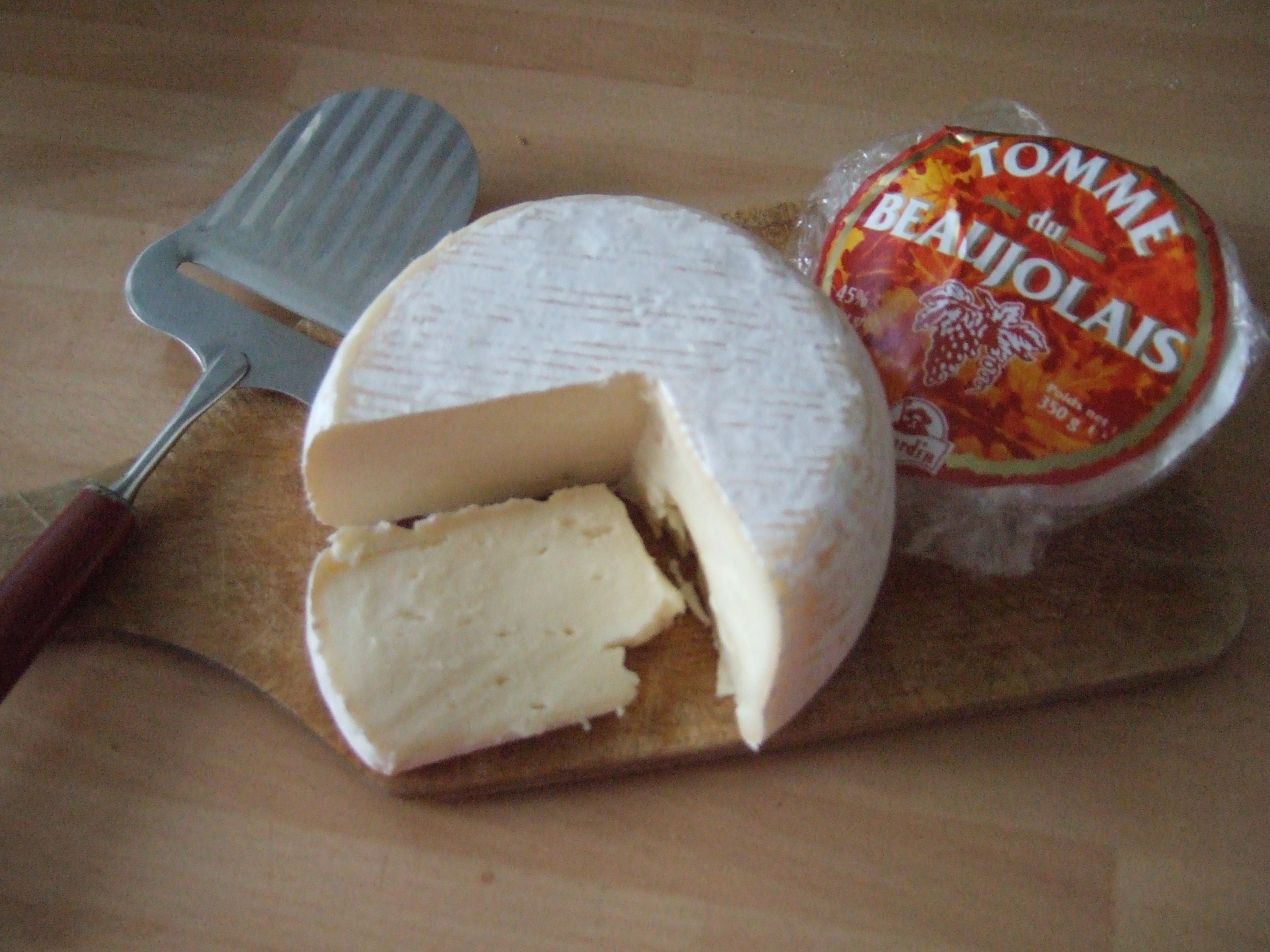
- Country of origin: France; Switzerland
- Source of milk: Cows, goats, sheep
- Pasteurised: No
- Texture: Hard

Tomme (French pronunciation: [tɔm]), occasionally spelled Tome, is a class of cheeses produced mainly in the French Alps and in Switzerland. It can be made from cow's, ewe's, or goat's milk. Tommes are normally produced from the skimmed milk left over after the cream has been removed to produce butter and richer cheeses, or when there is too little milk to produce a full cheese. As a result, they are generally low in fat. However, Tomme de Boudane and Tomme de Revard can contain as much as 20–40% fat. Tomme cheeses date back to ancient history.

There are many varieties of Tommes, which are usually identified by their place of origin. The most famous of these is Tomme de Savoie. Other Tommes include Tomme Boudane, Tomme au Fenouil, Tomme de Crayeuse, Tomme d'Aydius, Tomme de Grandmère, Tomme Affinée and Tomme du Revard. Tomme de Montagne is a collective term for the upland varieties, e.g., Tomme de Savoie but not Tomme de Beaujolais. An Italian product spelled Toma or Tuma originates from the area between Val d'Aoste and Ventimiglia, and is usually made from cow's milk.

Tomme fraîche is traditionally used to make aligot, an Auvergnat dish combining melted cheese and mashed potatoes.

== See also ==
- Swiss cheeses and dairy products
- Toma (Italy)
