= Laguiole cheese =

French cheese

Laguiole
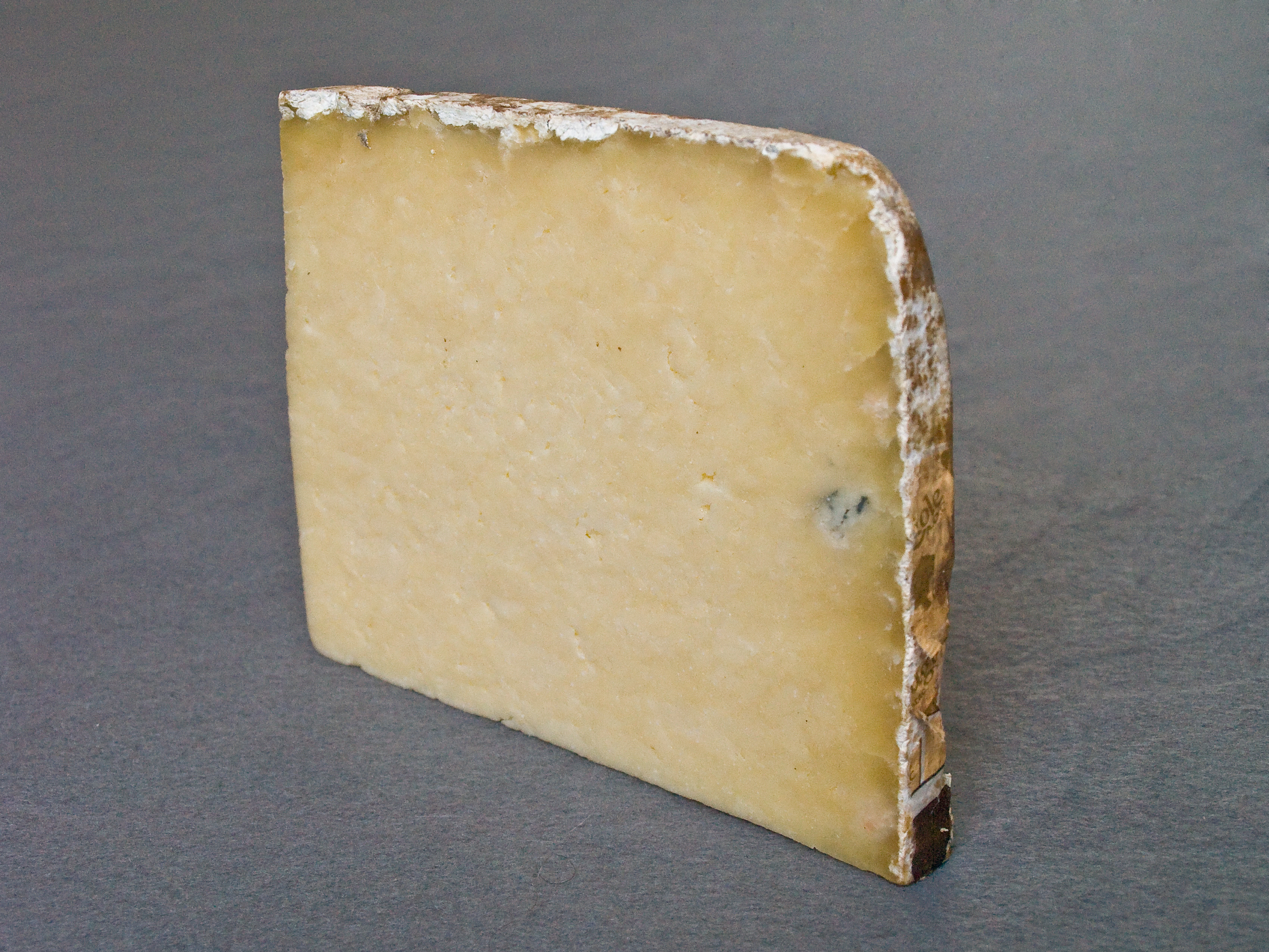
- Country of origin: France
- Region, town: Aveyron, Laguiole
- Source of milk: Cows
- Pasteurized: No
- Texture: semi-hard
- Aging time: 6–12 months
- Certification: French AOC 1961
- Named after: Laguiole

Laguiole (French pronunciation: [laɡjɔl], locally [lajɔl]; Languedocien: La Guiòla), sometimes called Tome de Laguiole, is a pressed uncooked French cheese from the plateau of Aubrac, situated between 800 and 1400 metres, in the Aveyron region in southern France. It takes its name from the small town of Laguiole and has been protected under the French appellation d'origine contrôlée (AOC) since 1961 and a appellation d'origine protégée since 1996. Laguiole is said to have been invented at a monastery in the mountains of Aubrac in the 19th century. According to historical accounts, the monks passed down the recipe for making this cheese from cows milk during the alpages to the local buronniers, the owners of burons, or mountain huts.

french-cheese.com describes it as:

surprisingly tender on the palate leaving a persistently wettish sensation. Its first hazelnut taste quickly transforms into a subtle acidic bouquet, in which touches of floral aromas with a very slight bitter sensation are mixed together with a low acidic piquant taste because of the salt.

Today, Laguiole is made in three different départements: Aveyron, Cantal and Lozère by the coopérative Jeune Montagne. It is the only producer currently licensed to produce this cheese. With a 45% fat content, Laguiole has a pressed, uncooked paste made exclusively from raw, unpasteurised French Simmental or Aubrac cow's milk collected between May and October above 800 m altitude. 666 tonnes were produced in 1998 (-9.14% since 1996) from 20,000 – 30,000 litres of milk collected from 79 different farms.

A Tome weighs 40–50 kg (88–110 lb) and is distinguished by a bull sign and its name stamped on the rind, as well as by an aluminum identification plaque. Its production process starts with renneting before the curd is pressed in two consecutive stages. Maturing takes at least six months and may be as long as twelve months. The rind is natural and thick, the straw-coloured paste supple and firm, and the texture rich and creamy. Recommended wines: fruity red wines such as the Marcillac, Cahors or Etraygues.

Traditionally, Tome (or Tomme) de Laguiole is one of the principal ingredients in aligot (mashed potatoes with cheese, cream and butter).

== See also ==
- List of cheeses
