= Reblochon =

French cheese made from raw cow's milk

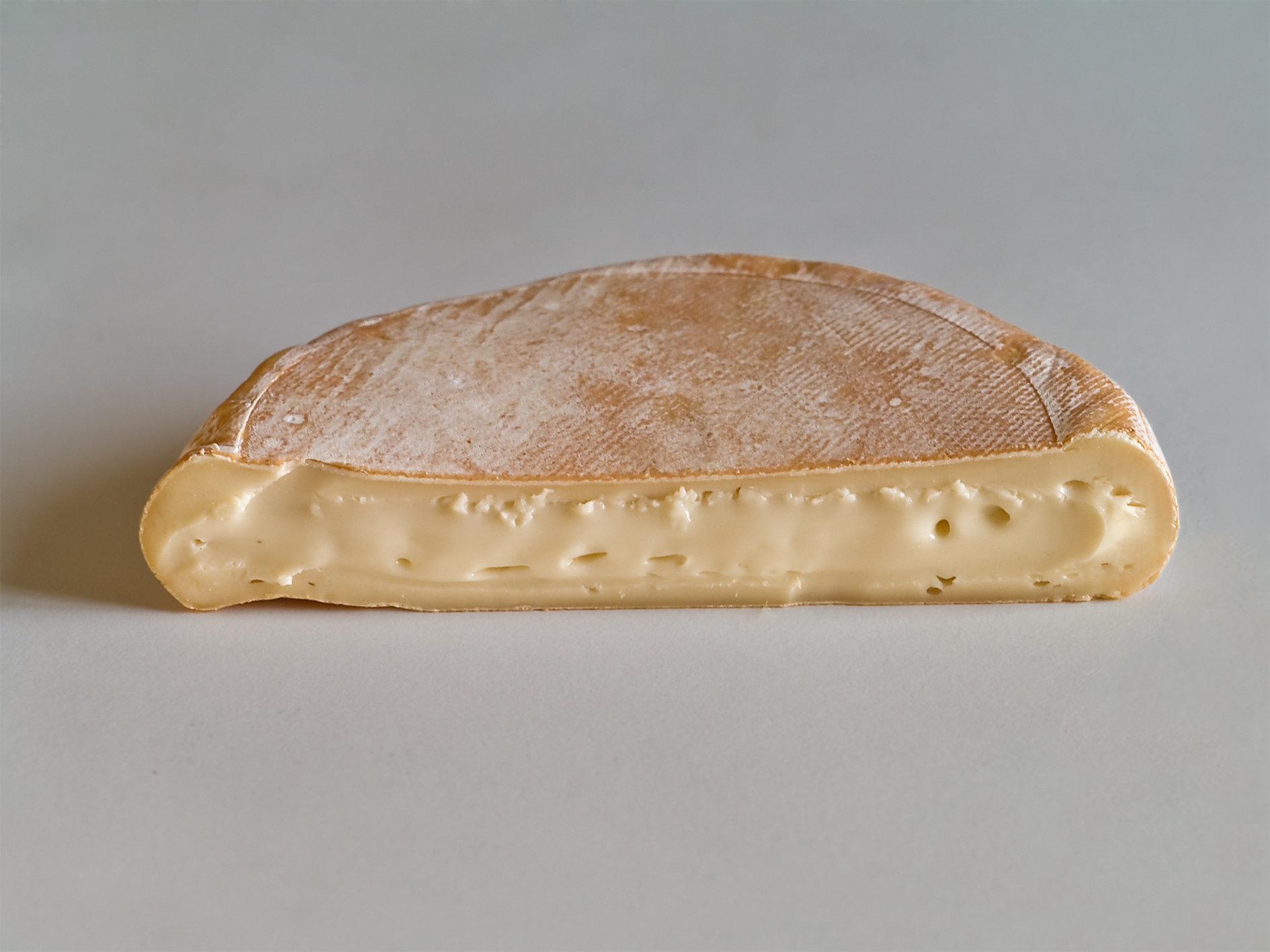
- Country of origin: France
- Region: Alps valley, Arly valley (Aravis Range)
- Source of milk: Cows
- Pasteurised: No
- Texture: Soft washed-rind, smear-ripened
- Fat content: 45%
- Weight: 450 g (avg)
- Aging time: 6–8 weeks
- Certification: French AOC 1958

Reblochon (French pronunciation: [ʁəblɔʃɔ̃]) is a soft washed-rind French cheese made in the Alpine region of Haute-Savoie from raw cow's milk. It has its own AOC designation.

Reblochon was first produced in the Thônes and Arly valleys, in the Aravis massif. Thônes remains the centre of Reblochon production; the cheeses are still made in the local cooperatives. Until 1964 Reblochon was also produced in Italian areas of the Alps. Subsequently, the Italian cheese has been sold in declining quantities under such names as Rebruchon and Reblò alpino.

== History ==
Reblochon derives from the word "reblocher" which when literally translated means "to pinch a cow's udder again". This refers to the practice of holding back some of the milk from the first milking. During the 14th century, the landowners would tax the mountain farmers according to the amount of milk their herds produced. The farmers would therefore not fully milk the cows until after the landowner had measured the yield. The milk that remains is much richer, and was traditionally used by the dairymaids to make their own cheese.

In the 16th century the cheese also became known as "fromage de dévotion" (devotional cheese) because it was offered to the Carthusian monks of the Thônes Valley by the farmers, in return for having their homesteads blessed.

=== U.S. unavailability ===
Reblochon has not been available in the United States since 2004, as it is unpasteurised and has not been sufficiently aged to pass U.S. import laws concerning the pasteurization of soft and semi-soft cheese. Delice du Jura, a pasteurized soft ripened cheese, is being marketed as a close relative and a good substitute in the United States. Préféré de nos Montagnes and Raclette can also be used as substitutes.

== Characteristics ==
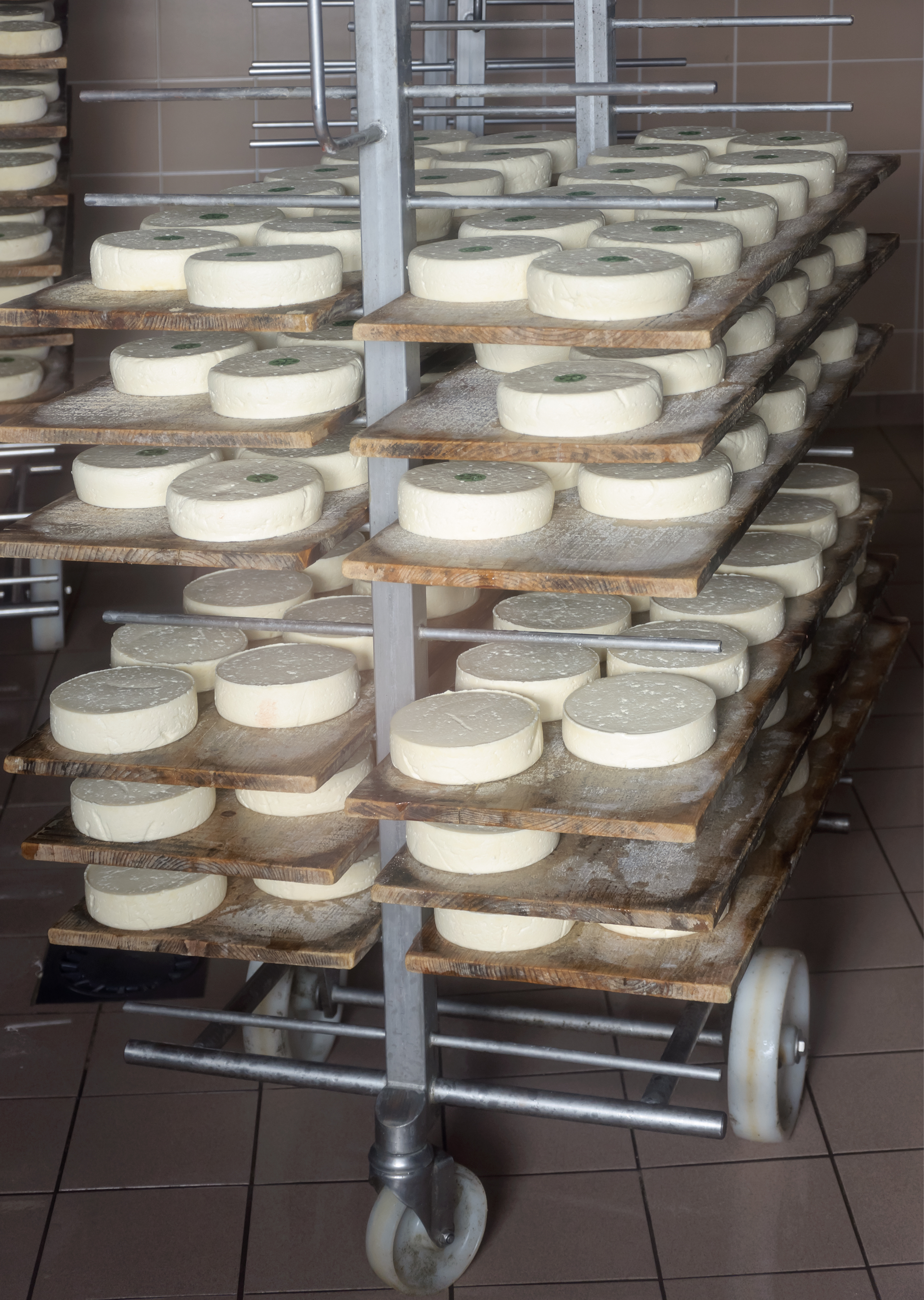
Farmhouse Reblochon, drying before ripening

Reblochon is a soft washed-rind and smear-ripened cheese traditionally made from raw cow's milk. The cow breeds best for producing the milk needed for this cheese are the Abondance, Tarentaise and the Montbéliarde. This cheese measures 14 cm (5.5 in) across and 3–4 cm (1.2–1.6 in) thick, has a soft centre with a washed rind and weighs an average of 450 grams (16 oz).

Reblochon has a nutty taste that remains in the mouth after its soft and uniform center has been enjoyed. It is an essential ingredient of tartiflette, a Savoyard gratin made from potatoes, bacon (lardons), and onions.

== See also ==
- List of cheeses
- Camembert
- Tartiflette
