= Aligot =

French cheese and potato dish

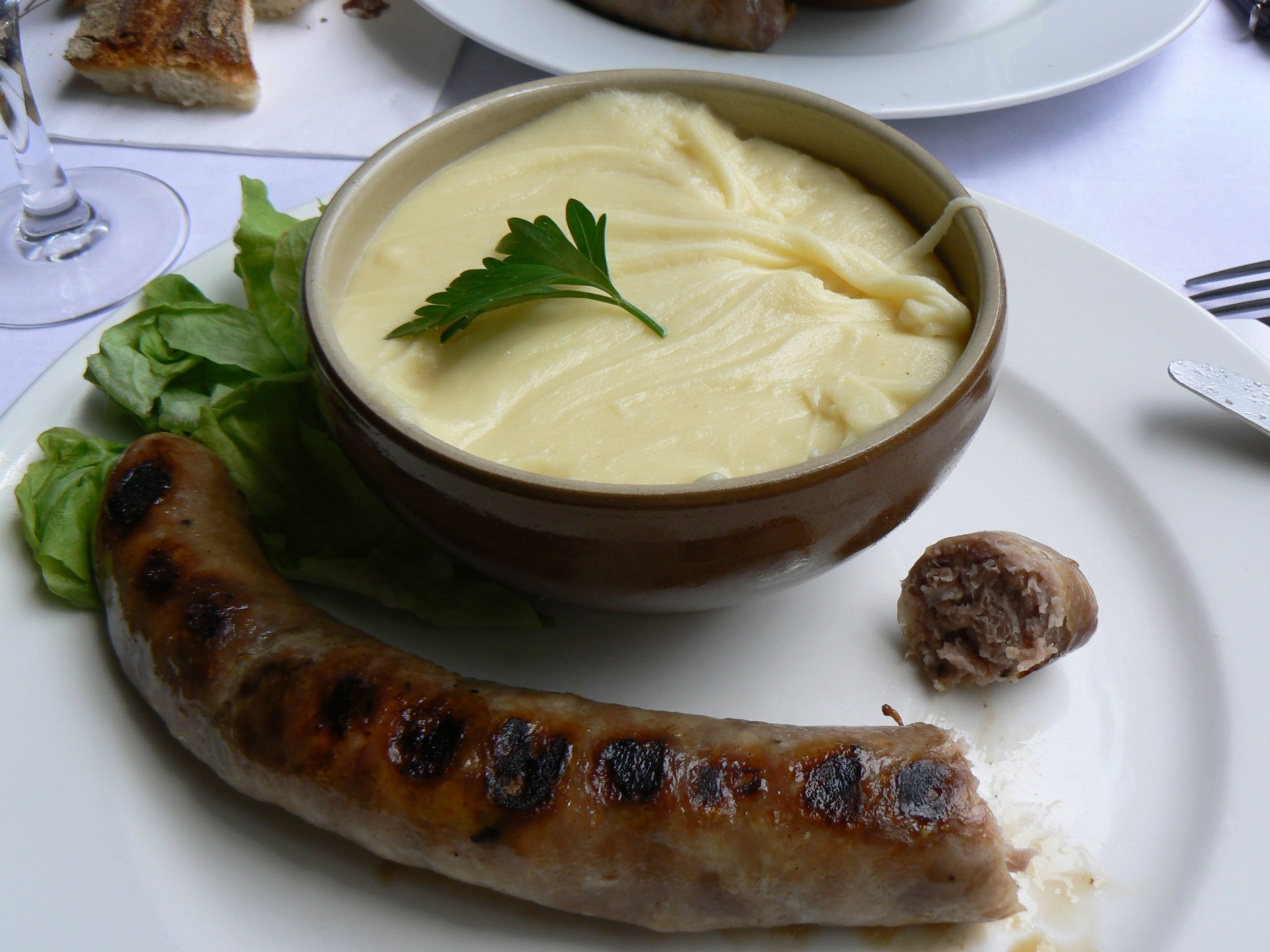
- Place of origin: France
- Region or state: Occitania
- Main ingredients: Mashed potatoes, butter, cream, cheese (tome de Laguiole or tome d'Auvergne), garlic

Aligot (Occitan: Aligòt) is a dish made from cheese blended into mashed potatoes (often with some garlic) that is made on the high plateau of Aubrac (part of the Aveyron, Cantal, and Lozère departments) in the southern Massif Central of France. This dish is a common sight in Auvergne restaurants.

== Background ==
Traditionally made with fresh tomme de Laguiole (tomme fraîche), or tomme d'Auvergne cheese, aligot is highly appreciated in the local gastronomy with thick Toulouse sausages or roast beef. Other cheeses are sometimes used in place of fresh tomme, which is hard to get as it should ideally be used in the days following its making, or else it will be too strong in taste. The choice of cheese is important, and strongly affects the result. The cheese must be mild, with a lactic tang, but not too much salt, and melt easily. Floury potatoes are preferable, rather than waxy.

== Ingredients ==
Aligot is made from mashed potatoes blended with butter, cream, and melted cheese, often but not always with crushed garlic. The dish is ready when it develops a smooth, elastic texture. While recipes vary, the Larousse Gastronomique gives the ingredients as 1 kg potatoes; 500 g tomme fraîche, Laguiole, or Cantal cheese; 2 garlic cloves; 30 g butter; salt and pepper.

== Serving history ==
This dish was prepared for pilgrims on the way to Santiago de Compostela who stopped for a night in that region. According to legend, aligot was originally prepared with bread, and potatoes were substituted after their introduction to France. Today, it is enjoyed for village gatherings and celebrations as a main dish. In the region of Aubrac, and more generally in the south of Auvergne, Aligot is still cooked by hand in homes and street markets. During the summer, it is the main (and often only) dish served in traditional farm buildings known as "burons", where cows used to be milked, that are converted into seasonal restaurants.

== Etymology ==
The name aligot may have been derived from the Occitan alicouot, from the Latin aliquid, or from the Old French harigoter.

== See also ==
- Truffade
- List of cheese dishes
- List of potato dishes
