= List of French desserts =

List of Pâtisserie

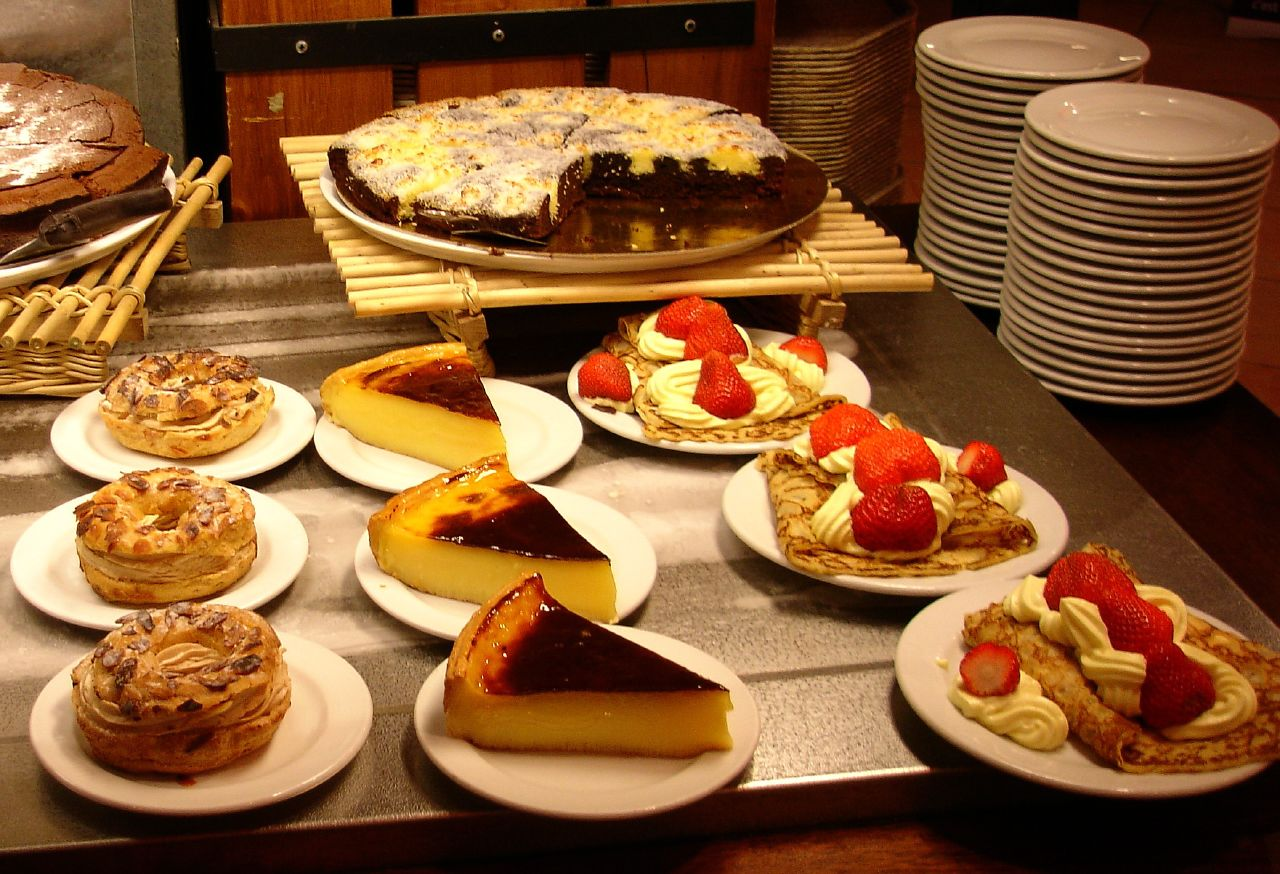
Desserts in Paris

This is a list of French desserts, sweet pastries and cakes that come from French cuisine. In France, a chef who prepares desserts, cakes and sweet pastries is called a pâtissier, who is part of a kitchen hierarchy in French cuisine termed brigade de cuisine (kitchen staff). In France, both the bakery and the goods they make are called pâtisserie, although simple rustic goods are made at home.

== A to C ==
Name	Image	Course	Description	Reference
Baba au rhum		Dessert	A rum baba or baba au rhum is a small yeast cake saturated in syrup made with alcohol, usually rum, and sometimes filled with whipped cream or pastry cream.	
Beignet		Breakfast / dessert / snack	A deep-fried dessert or snack made from either choux pastry, rice flour or a yeast leavened batter.	
Bichon au citron		Breakfast / dessert / snack	A puff pastry turnover filled with lemon curd.	
Biscuit rose de Reims		Biscuit/Cookie	A pink biscuit used in French pâtisserie, including Charlotte.	
Bombe Alaska		Dessert	A cake of ice cream and meringue.	
Bombe glacée		Dessert	An ice cream dessert frozen in a spherical mould so as to resemble a cannonball, hence the name ice cream bomb.	
Bûche de Noël		Dessert / snack	A Christmas cake made up of a rolled sponge filled with a buttercream or ganache, and then covered by the same ingredients to resemble a log.	
Bugnes		Dessert / snack	Similar to a beignet.	
Café liégeois		Dessert	A French cold dessert made from lightly sweetened coffee, coffee-flavoured ice cream and Chantilly cream.	
Calisson		Dessert	A French candy that is consumed as part of the 13 desserts of Christmas.	
Canelé		Breakfast / dessert / snack	A pâtisserie made with a batter, rum and vanilla. It has a soft and tender, custardy centre and a dark, thick, caramelized crust.	
Charlotte		Dessert	Classed as a bread pudding or an icebox cake, either Bread, sponge cake, crumbs or biscuits/cookies are used to line a mould, which filled with fruit puree or custard, and then baked.	
Chichis fregis		Snack	A type of donut shaped similar to a Churros.	
Chouquette		Breakfast / snack	Small pieces of choux pastry, sugared and baked.	
Clafoutis		Dessert / breakfast	A baked dish made with sour cherries and batter.	
Compote		Dessert	Fruit stewed in water with sugar and spice.	
Crème bavaroise		Dessert	A dessert consisting of an egg-based cooked custard and gelatin or isinglass, into which whipped cream is folded.	
Crème brûlée		Dessert	A rich custard base topped with a contrasting layer of hard caramel.	
Crème caramel		Dessert	A custard dessert with a layer of clear caramel sauce.	
Crème chiboust		Dessert	A type of crème pâtissière. Sometimes called Crème Saint Honoré.	
Crêpes sucrées		Dessert	A dessert made from unleavened batter that is cooked on a frying pan or a griddle.	
Crêpe Suzette		Dessert	A dessert consisting of crêpes with beurre Suzette, a sauce of caramelized sugar and butter, tangerine or orange juice, zest, and Grand Marnier, triple sec or orange Curaçao liqueur on top, flambéed tableside.	
Croquembouche		Dessert	Dessert consisting of choux pastry puffs piled into a cone and bound with threads of caramel.	
Croustade		Dessert / snack	French fruit pies or tarts.	

== D to G ==
Name	Image	Course	Description	Reference
Dacquoise		Dessert	A dessert cake made with layers of almond and hazelnut meringue and whipped cream or buttercream. The term dacquoise can also refer to the nut meringue layer itself.	
Dame blanche		Dessert	An ice-cream sundae created by Auguste Escoffier.	
Dariole		Dessert	A French term for a small culinary mold in the shape of a truncated cone used in making desserts, but also can be used to name the dishes made inside the molds.	
Diplomate au Bavarois		Dessert	A cold dessert prepared in a mold, made with crème bavaroise.	
Divorcé		Dessert / snack	Two choux pastry balls, one filled with chocolate, the other with coffee flavoured pastry cream, are joined and covered with corresponding fondant icing and a piping of pastry cream to separate the two different balls.	
Éclair		Dessert / snack	A choux dough in an oblong shape, filled with a cream and topped with a flavored icing.	
Far Breton		Dessert / snack	A cake or dessert made with a batter similar to clafoutis, normally with prunes or raisins.	
Fraisier		Dessert	A cake composed of a genoise, strawberries and crème mousseline.	
Financier		Dessert / snack	A small French almond cake, flavoured with beurre noisette, usually baked in a small mold.	
Flan pâtissier/parisien		Dessert / snack	A baked tart consisting of an outer pastry crust filled with custard.	
Flaugnarde		Dessert	A baked dessert with fruit arranged in a buttered dish and covered with a thick batter.	
Galette des Rois			A flaky puff pastry traditionally filled with frangipane.	
Gâteau à la broche		Dessert / snack	A cake made with butter, eggs, flour, sugar, and cream, cooked on a rotating spit in the oven or over an open fire.	
Gâteau opéra		Dessert	A cake made with layers of almond sponge cake (known as Joconde in French) soaked in coffee syrup (or Grand Marnier), layered with ganache and coffee-flavoured French buttercream, and covered in a chocolate glaze.	
Gâteau des rois		Dessert / snack	A crown-shaped brioche dough decorated with candied fruit and coarse sugar.	
Gâteau St-Honoré		Dessert	A dessert made of a circle of shortcrust pastry at its base with a ring of pâte à choux piped on the outer edge. Baked choux puffs are dipped in caramelized sugar and attached side by side on top of the circle of the pâte à choux.	
Gâteau au yaourt		Breakfast/ snack	A yoghurt cake.	

== H to M ==
Name	Image	Course	Description	Reference
Jésuite		Snack	A triangular, puff pastry filled with frangipane cream and topped with sliced almonds and sugar.	
île flottante		Dessert	A dessert consisting of soft meringue floating on crème anglaise.	
Kouign-amann		Dessert / snack	A sweet, round laminated dough baked product, originally made with bread dough, but is also made with laminated viennoiserie dough, containing layers of butter and incorporated sugar.	
Macaron		Dessert / snack	A sweet meringue-based confection made with egg white, icing sugar, granulated sugar, ground almond, and often food colouring, often filled with a ganache, buttercream or jam.	
Madeleine		Snack	Small sponge cakes with a distinctive scallop-like shape acquired from being baked in pans with shell-shaped depressions.	
Marjolaine		Dessert	A dessert of Dacquoise meringue layers with chocolate buttercream.	
Mendiant	upright=0 5	Dessert	A traditional French confection composed of a chocolate disk studded with nuts and dried fruits representing the four mendicant religious orders, eaten as part of the 13 desserts for Christmas.	
Meringue		Dessert	A dessert made with whipped egg whites and sugar.	
Mille-feuille	upright=0 5	Dessert	A puff pastry layered with pastry cream.	
Mont Blanc		Dessert	A dessert of sweetened chestnut purée in the form of vermicelli, topped with whipped cream.	
Mousse		Dessert	A dessert made with flavoured whipped cream.	

== N to P ==
Name	Image	Course	Description	Reference
pouding à la Nesselrode		Dessert	A chestnut-based frozen dessert.	
Nonnette (dessert)		Dessert / snack	A small gingerbread cake made of honey, rye flour, and usually filled with orange marmalade or honey.	
Oreilette		Dessert	A fried sweet fritter made with dough, part of the 13 desserts of Christmas and Mardi Gras.	
Pain d'épices		Dessert / snack	A spiced cake, part of the French baking category of Gateau de Voyage. It is made with rye flour, honey and spices. It is the closest French dish to a gingerbread.	
Pain perdu		Dessert / snack	A dish of sliced bread soaked in beaten eggs and often milk or cream, then pan-fried. It is known as french toast in English.	
Paris–Brest		Dessert	A choux pastry filled with a praline flavoured cream and covered with flaked almonds.	
Pêche Melba		Dessert	A dessert of peaches and raspberry sauce with vanilla ice cream.	
Petit four		Dessert	A small bite-sized confectionery, pâtisserie or savory appetiser.	
Plombières	upright:0.5	Dessert	An almond extract ice cream, flavored with kirsch and candied fruit.	
Profiterole		Dessert	A filled French choux pastry ball with a typically sweet and moist filling of whipped cream, custard, pastry cream, or ice cream.	
Poire à la Beaujolaise		Dessert	A dessert of pears poached in red wine.	
Poire belle Hélène		Dessert	A dessert of pears poached in a sugar syrup served with vanilla ice cream and chocolate syrup.	
Pot de crème		Dessert	A dessert of baked custard.	
Puits d'amour		Dessert	A French pâtisserie made with puff pastry with a hollow center filled with redcurrant jelly or raspberry jam.	

== Q to Z ==
Name	Image	Course	Description	Reference
Quatre-quarts		Snack	A creamed sponge or pound cake.	
Queyras pie		Snack, dessert	A tart filled with jam and covered with lattice patterns of pastry, similar to a Tarte de Alpes.	
Religieuse		Dessert	A dessert made of a small choux pastry case stacked on top of a larger one, both filled with crème pâtissière, commonly flavoured with chocolate or mocha.	
Riz à l'impératrice		Dessert	An elaborate molded version of a rice pudding.	
Roulé à la cannelle		Snack	A cinnamon roll.	
Savarin		Dessert	A cake similar to baba au rhum.	
Soufflé		Main, Dessert	A baked egg dish.	
Tarte des Alpes	upright=0 5	Snack, dessert	A tart filled with jam and covered with lattice patterns of pastry.	
Tarte à l'badrée		Dessert	A type of custard tart.	
Tarte à la brimbelle		Dessert	A blueberry tart.	
Tarte à la châtaigne		Dessert	A sweet chestnut pie from Cevennes d'ardeche	
Tarte au citron		Dessert	A Dessert tart made shortcrust pastry and a lemon curd.	
Tarte conversation		Dessert	A type of tart made with puff pastry that is filled with frangipane cream and topped with royal icing.	
Tarte aux mirabelles		Dessert	A sweet French tart, combining pastry and mirabelle plum.	
Tarte Normande		Dessert / snack	A shortcrust pastry variant of the apple tart made in Normandy, filled with apple, sliced almonds and sugar, topped with creamy egg custard and baked until the topping is slightly caramelised.	
Tarte Tatin		Dessert	A tart in which the fruit (usually apples) is caramelized in butter and sugar before the tart is baked.	
Tarte Tropézienne		Dessert	A dessert viennoiserie consisting of a halved brioche filled with a mix of two creams, thick crème pâtissière and buttercream.	
Teurgoule		Dessert	A rice pudding that is a speciality of Lower Normandy.	
Tuile		Dessert	A baked wafer served as an accompaniment of other dishes.	
Vitréais		Snack, dessert	A sponge layer cake made of apples with salted butter caramel, eggs and almonds.	

== See also ==
- Pâtisserie – a French or Belgian bakery that specializes in desserts, cakes and sweet pastry. The goods made are also called Pâtisserie. In both countries it is a legally controlled title that may only be used by bakeries that employ a licensed maître pâtissier (master pastry chef).
- Viennoiserie
- Cuisine
- List of desserts
- List of French cheeses
- List of French dishes § Common desserts and pastries
- Feuilletine, an ingredient of French confectionery, made from crisped crêpes
