= Tarte =

Tarte may refer to:

== Food ==
- Tarte flambée (German: Flammkuchen), Alsatian wood-fired dish
- Tarte Tatin, upside-down fruit tart
- Tarte Tropézienne, dessert pastry
- Tarte des Alpes a pastry found specifically in the Southern Alps
- Tarte al d'jote culinary speciality of the city of Nivelles, Belgium

== Other ==
- Tarte Cosmetics, a brand of beauty products
- Tarte (surname)
- Tarte (album), 2007 debut album by Majandra Delfino

== See also ==
- Tart (disambiguation)
