= Tart (surname) =

Tart is a surname, and may refer to:

- Carl Tart (born 1989), American actor, writer and comedian
- Charles Tart (1937–2025), American psychologist and parapsychologist
- Indrek Tart (born 1946), Estonian poet, husband of Aili Aarelaid-Tart
- Josh Quong Tart (born 1975), Australian actor
- Levern Tart (1942–2010), American basketball player
- Mei Quong Tart (1850–1903), Chinese-Australian merchant
- Teair Tart (born 1997), American football player

== See also ==
- Tartt
- Tarte (surname)
- Tarto
- Tartu (surname)
