= Nonette =

Nonette may refer to:

- Nonette (river), a tributary of the Oise in northern France
- The Prix de la Nonette, a horse race held in Deauville, France each August
- Nonette, Puy-de-Dôme, a commune of the Puy-de-Dôme department in France
- The Nonnette is a French small gingerbread cake with orange marmalade.
