= Tart (disambiguation) =

A tart is a pastry dish, usually sweet in flavor, with an open top.

Tart may also refer to:

== Common meanings ==
- Tart, a sharp, sour, or acidic flavor
- Slang for a prostitute or more generally a woman who is promiscuous or dresses or acts in a sexually provocative way

== Arts and entertainment ==
- Tart (film), a 2001 film
- Tart (Tokyo Mew Mew), a fictional character in the anime and manga series Tokyo Mew Mew
- tART Artist Collective, a feminist and artist collective based in New York City

== People ==
- Tart (surname)

== Other uses ==
- Tahoe Truckee Area Regional Transit(TART), the mass transit provider for the north shore of Lake Tahoe
- The Tart, a British satirical newspaper
- Tart, Côte-d'Or, a commune in the Côte-d'Or department in eastern France
- TART Trail, a cycle and walking track on disused railway lines in Michigan

== See also ==
- Tarte (disambiguation)
- Donna Tartt, American writer
