= Normandy tart =

French almond dessert tart

Normandy Tart
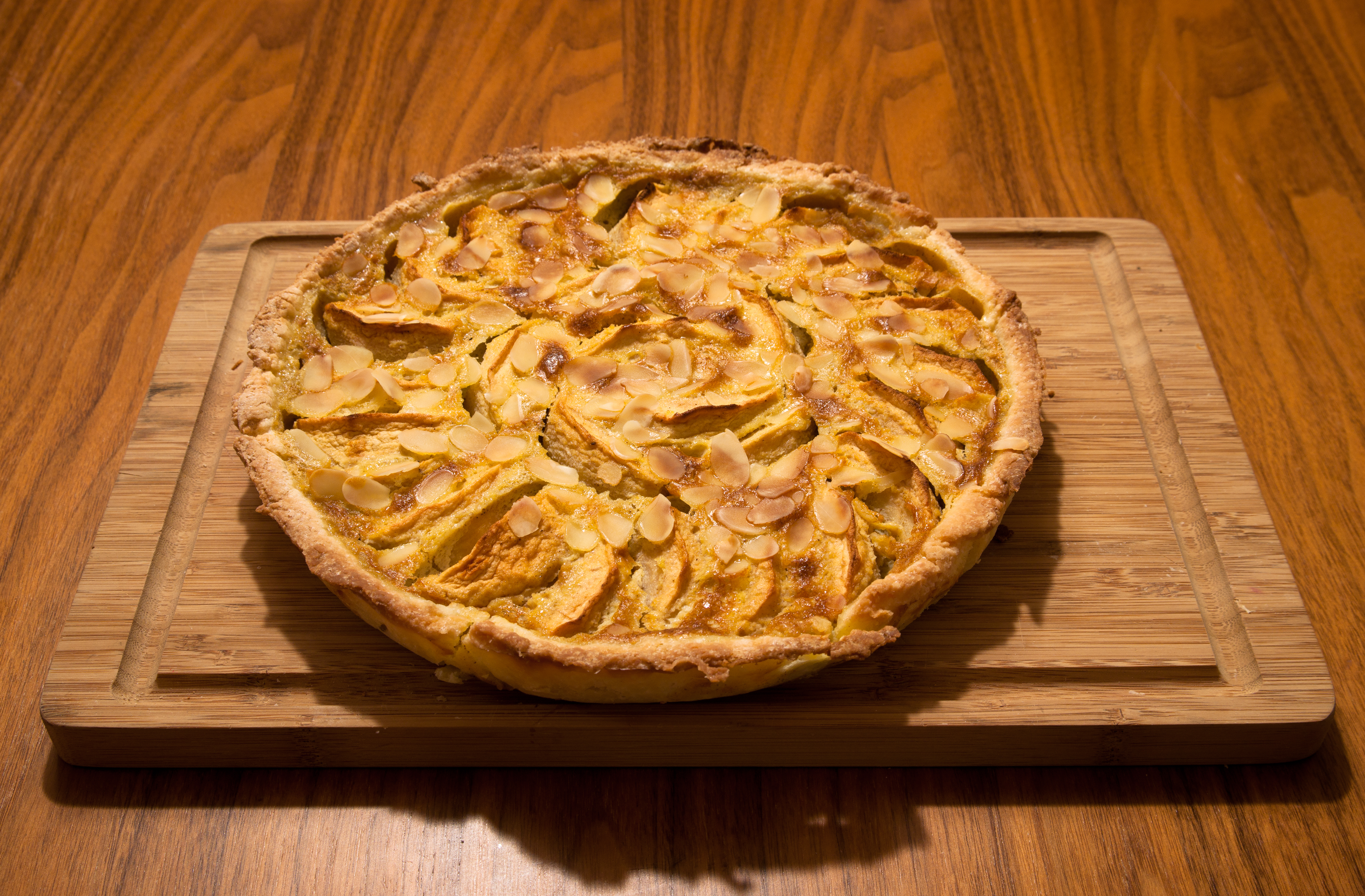
- Normandy Tart
- Place of origin: France
- Region or state: Normandy
- Main ingredients: Shortcrust pastry, apples, sliced almonds, sugar

Normandy tart is a shortcrust pastry-based (pâte brisée) variant of the apple tart made in Normandy filled with apples, sliced almonds and sugar, topped with creamy egg custard and baked until the topping is slightly caramelised. It is known in French as Tarte normande.

Other variations of the tart include substituting the egg custard for a layer of almond paste, or almond and apple paste, or frangipane almond pastry all topped with a pattern of semi-circular apple slices (some are decorated with a pastry lattice and most are made with short crust pastry).

In the UK, the French bakers chain Paul sells the dish under the product name Tarte Flan Normand, while some UK supermarkets sell the product in the Frozen section.

== See also ==
- List of almond dishes
- List of French desserts
