= Petit four =

French confection or pâtisserie

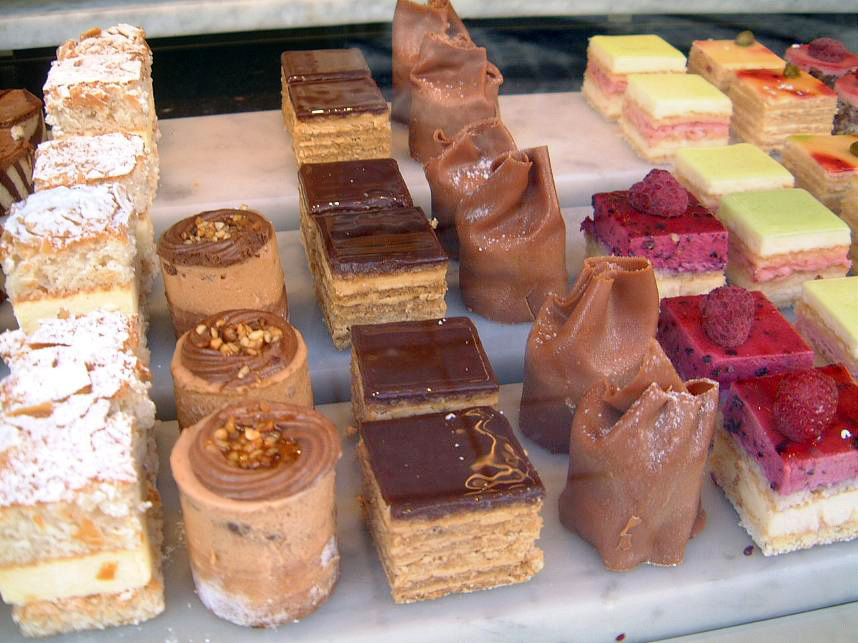
- An assortment of petits fours
- Type: Confectionery; Pâtisserie
- Course: Dessert
- Place of origin: France
- Main ingredients: Varies by type

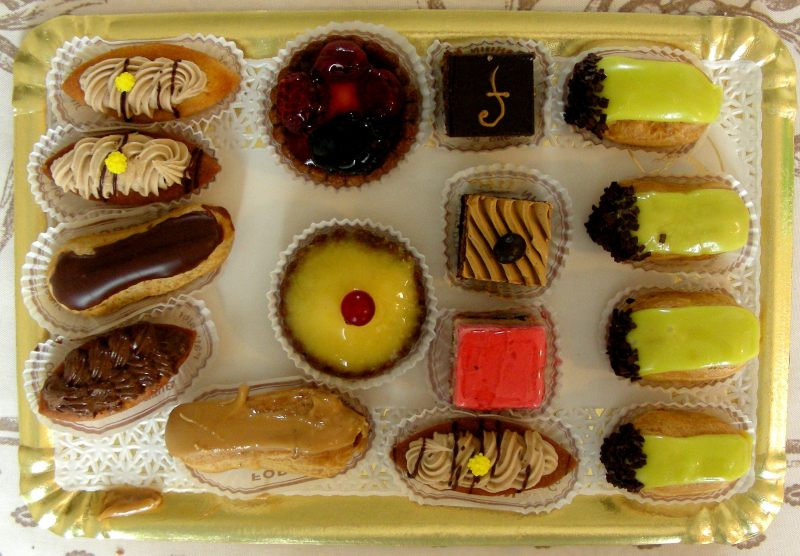
French assortment of petits fours

A petit four (French pronunciation: [pəti fuʁ]; plural: petits fours [pəti fuʁ]) is a small bite-sized confectionery, pâtisserie or savory appetiser. The name is French for "small oven". Certain petit fours are also known as mignardises [miɲaʁdiz]. In England they are also known as fancies and as dainties in the prairie provinces of Canada.

== History and etymology ==
There are two explanations for the name and development of petit fours. The most accepted is that during the 19th century in France, an oven was little more than a stone cabinet with a fire lit underneath. Because of this simplicity, there was no temperature control therefore you either had a hot oven or cooling down. The French called the hot oven grand four, which translates into English as 'big oven,' and was used to cook bread. Once the fire had extinguished, the oven took a while to cool down, so the residual heat was used to cook small cakes and pastries. The cooling oven was called petit four in French, or 'small oven' in English.

The alternative comes from historian Betty Wason in her book Cooks, Gluttons and Gourmets: A History of Cookery. According to Wason, the cakes were first presented as part of the course of entremet to Louis XIV as part of the competition between his chefs to impress him.

== Types ==
Petits fours come in the following varieties:

- Glacé ("glazed"), these are tiny cakes made from sponge or pound cake, layered with jam or buttercream, and fully coated in glossy fondant, icing, or chocolate.
- Salé ("salted"), savory bite-sized appetizers usually served at cocktail parties or buffets.
- Sec ("dry"), dainty biscuits, baked meringues, macarons, and puff pastries
- Frais ("fresh"), small cakes with perishable ingredients such as whipped cream, in products such as miniature Éclairs or tart.
- Deguises ("disguised"), bite-sized treats featuring fruits or nuts that are coated or "disguised" in a layer of marzipan, caramel, or chocolate.

In French pâtisserie, miniature iced cakes, such as éclairs, chocolate profiteroles or sweet tartlets are known as petit fours, while miniature desserts, that are not baked, such as mini chocolate mousses are called mignardises.

Different categories of petit four

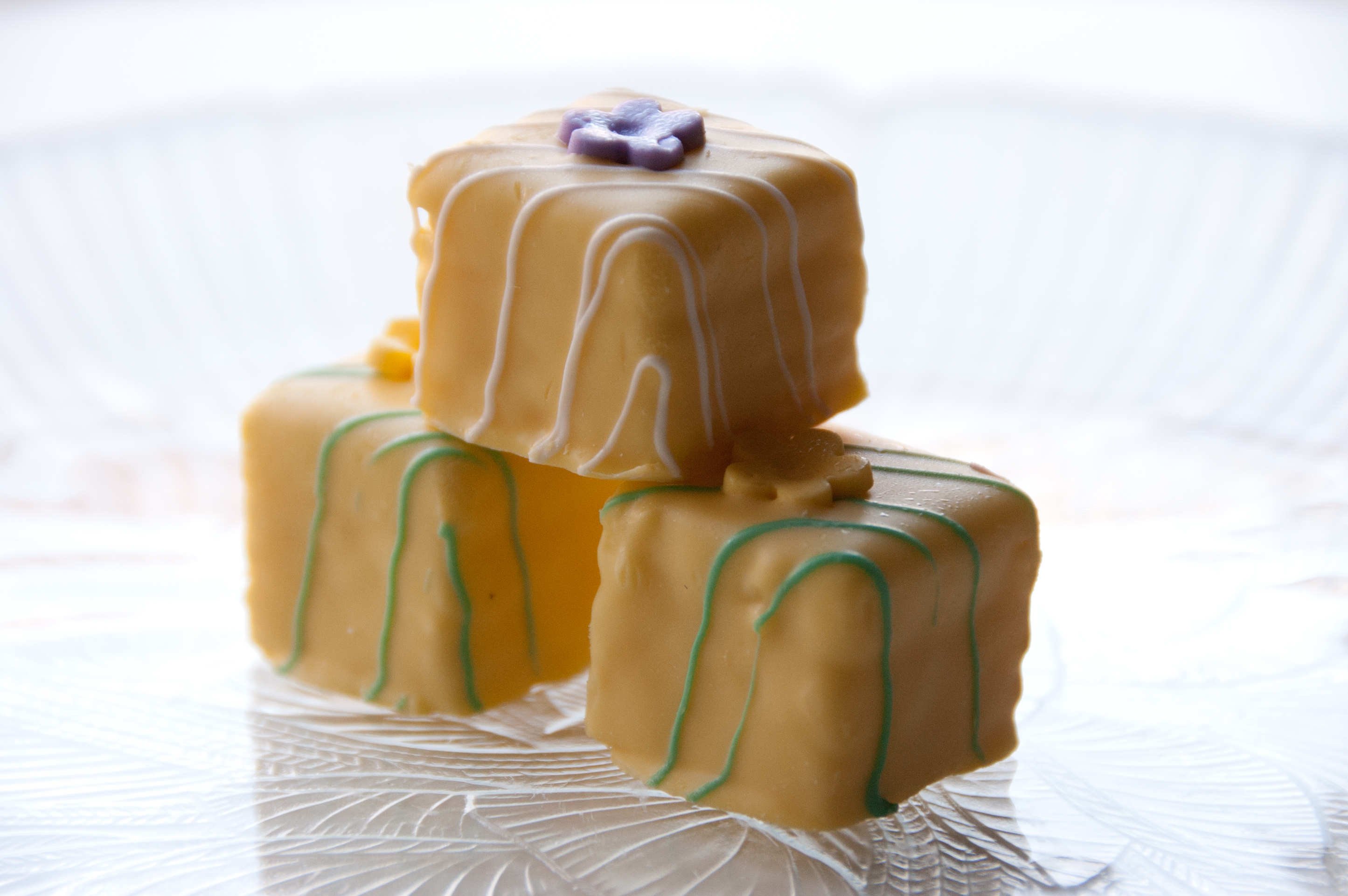
Petit four glacé

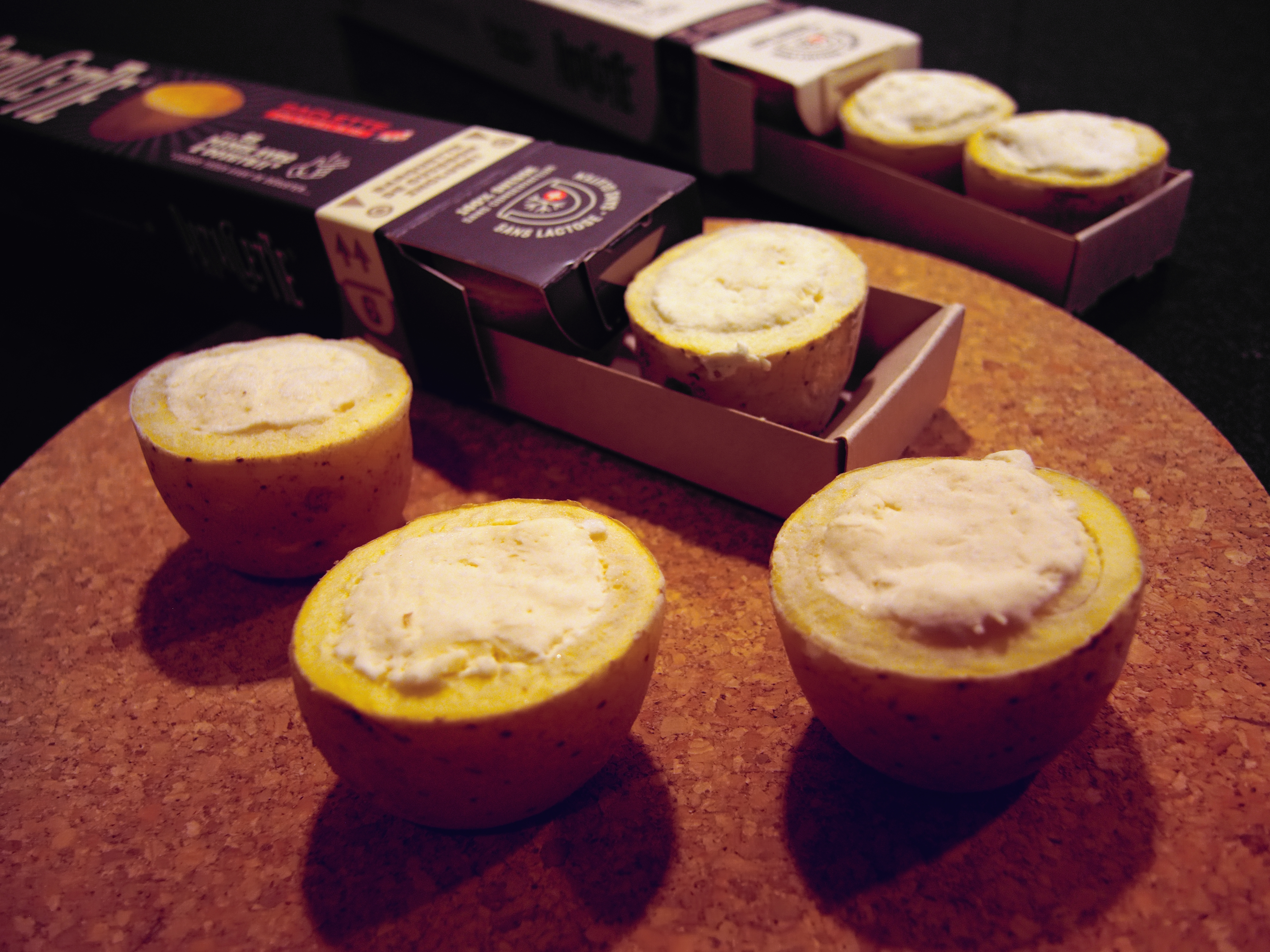
Petit four salé made of potato and cheese

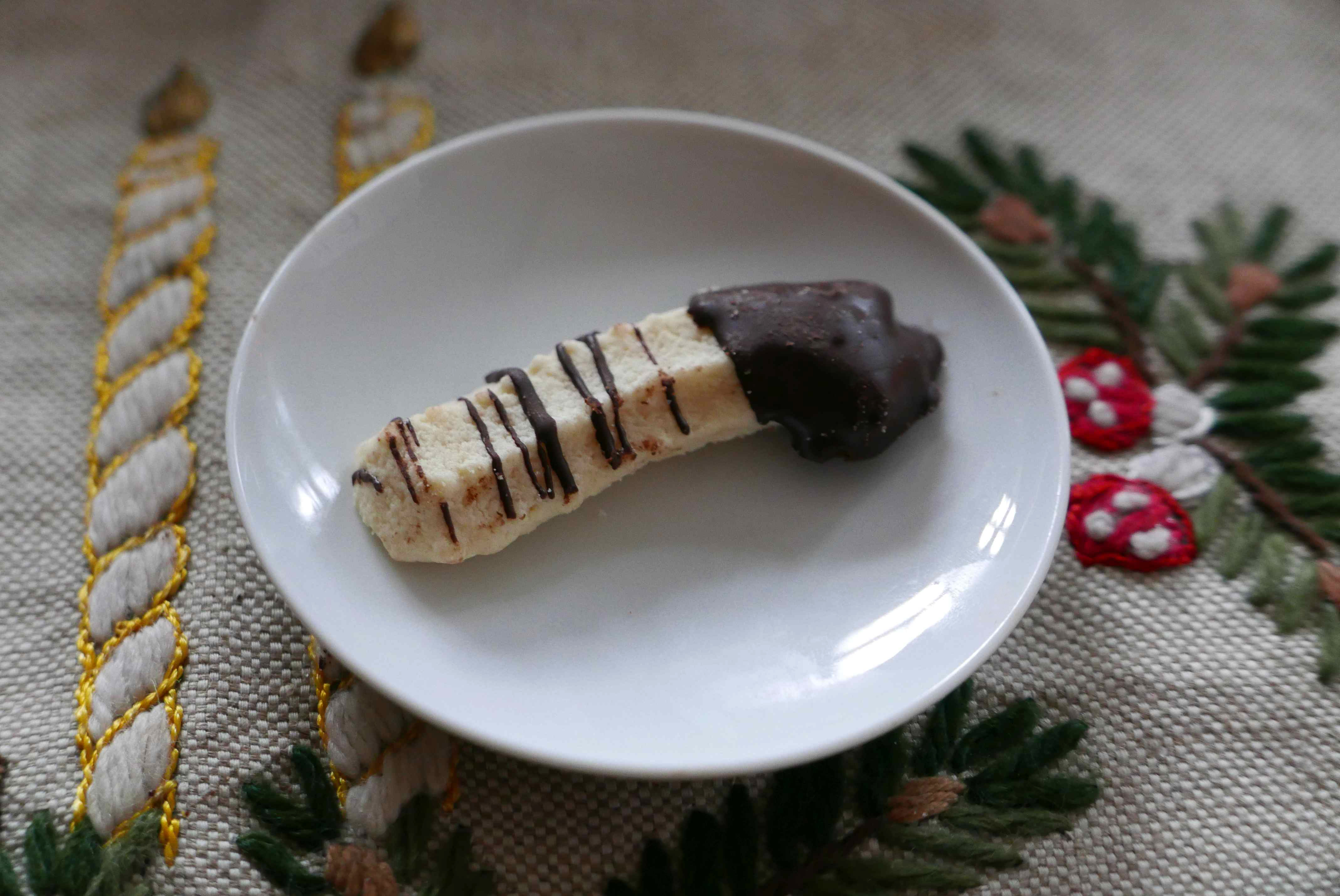
Petit four sec with chocolate coating

== See also ==
- List of French desserts
