= Tartu (surname) =

Tartu is a surname. Notable people with the surname include:

- Arnold Tartu (1910–1986), Estonian politician
- Jean-François Tartu (1751–1793), French naval officer
- Voldemar-Johannes Tartu (1900–1953), Estonian politician

== See also ==
- Tarto
