= Bichon au citron =

Puff pastry turnover filled with lemon curd

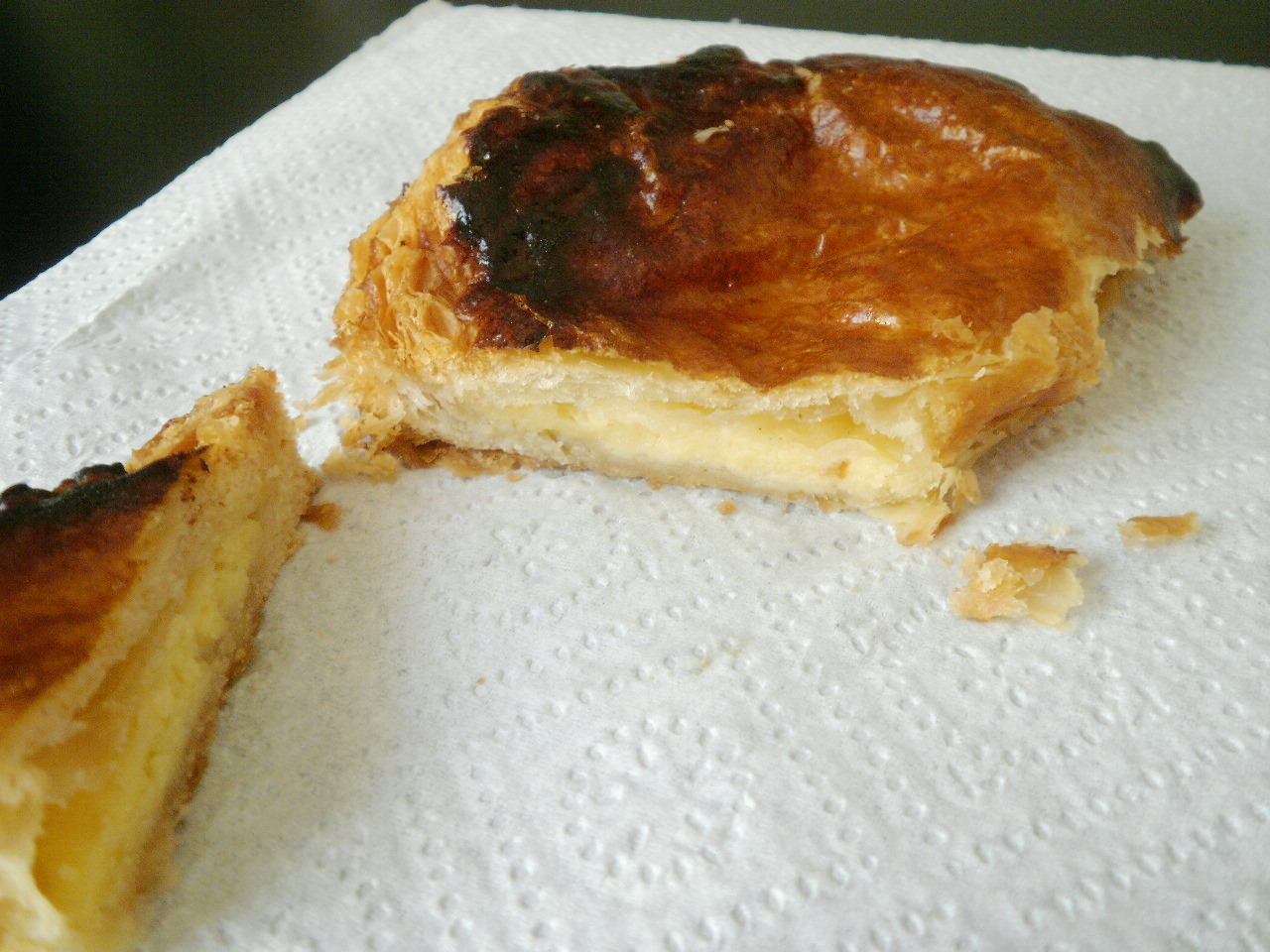
- Bichon au citron
- Type: Turnover
- Place of origin: France
- Main ingredients: Puff pastry, sugar, lemon curd

The bichon au citron is a French pâtisserie turnover that is made of puff pastry. A major distinguishing feature is that it is filled with lemon curd. The outer layer of sugar is sometimes partially caramelized.

== See also ==
- List of French desserts
