= Poire à la Beaujolaise =

Pear based dessert

Pears in wine
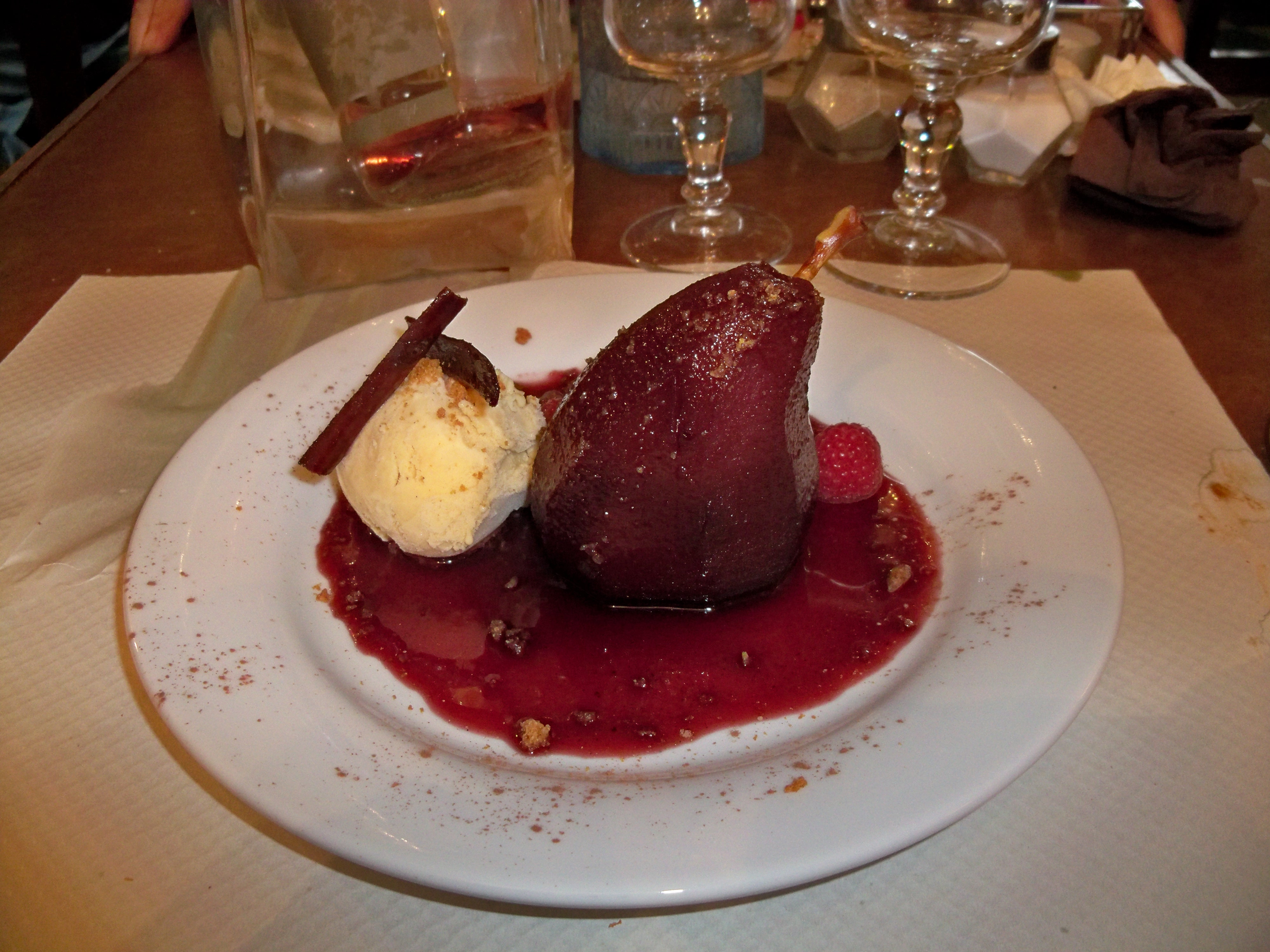
- Alternative names: poire au vin, pere al vino, pera al vino, pêras bêbadas
- Type: Dessert
- Place of origin: France, Italy, Spain, Portugal
- Main ingredients: Pear, red wine, sugar, spices

Pears in wine are a typical dessert consisting of peeled pears cooked in red wine and originating in Latin European countries, particularly in the wine-producing regions of Beaujolais, Burgundy, Bordeaux, Castile and León, Piedmont and La Rioja.

In northern Spain, pears in wine are a typical dessert from wine-growing regions such as Ribera del Duero or La Rioja. In Spanish cuisine, this dessert is also known as peras con salsa obispo (‘bishop sauce’) and has a long tradition. In France, pears in spiced wine was part of the quarter metz (fourth course) in medieval banquet, with the recipe appearing in the 14th century cook book Le Viandier de Guillaume Tirel dit Tallevent. The dessert is now known as poire au vin rouge or poire à la beaujolaise, as it is considered to originate from this wine-growing region. In Italy, it is mainly prepared in Piedmont, the northern region where Barolo is produced, and is called pere al vino or pere cotte. Also typical of Piedmont is the timballo de Martin Sec, a shortcrust pastry tart filled with the same pears cooked in wine with sugar and spices. In Portugal, the dessert is known as Pêras bêbadas (translates to English as Drunken Pears), and is sometimes made with Port wine. Peeres in Confyt was a 14th century English recipe in The Forme of Cury, a cook book written by the chief Master Cooks of King Richard II. A recipe for Wardonys in Syryp appears in from Harleian MS 279, a fifteenth-century English culinary manuscript preserved in Two Fifteenth-Century Cookery-Books. The pears are first softened, then simmered in red wine with cinnamon, sugar, ginger, vinegar, and saffron.

== History ==
Cooking pears in wine with spices started in medieval times as a method of preserving fresh fruit, as the noble houses had plenty of wine, and it was seen as a way to impress guests. An early recipe first appeared in English within the 1747 cookbook, The Art of Cookery made Plain and Easy by Hannah Glasse.

In the early 19th century, a recipe already existed, known as "old wife pear compote". The pears were cooked in a pan with red wine, sugar, a piece of cinnamon and cloves. Once cooked, the pears would develop wrinkles, thus the name "old wife". If the cooking did not result in the desired red color, cochineal was added and a tin spoon placed inside the jar. Gaston Bachelard in his book Rational materialism said, "Tin has the property on enhancing the red color of vegetable matter; this fact is known by cooks, who never fail to put a tin spoon in pear compote, in order to give it a good red color".

Poire belle Hélène, created by Auguste Escoffier, is a variation on the dessert, with the pears poached in a sugar syrup instead of wine.

== Preparation ==
To prepare the pears with red wine, a fruity wine should be used. The other ingredients are sugar or honey, cloves, peppercorn, a cinnamon stick, a vanilla pod and orange zest. The mixture is brought to the boil and drained, thus allowing the wine to be reduced. The dessert is served cold or tepid.
