= Nonnette (dessert) =

French gingerbread cake

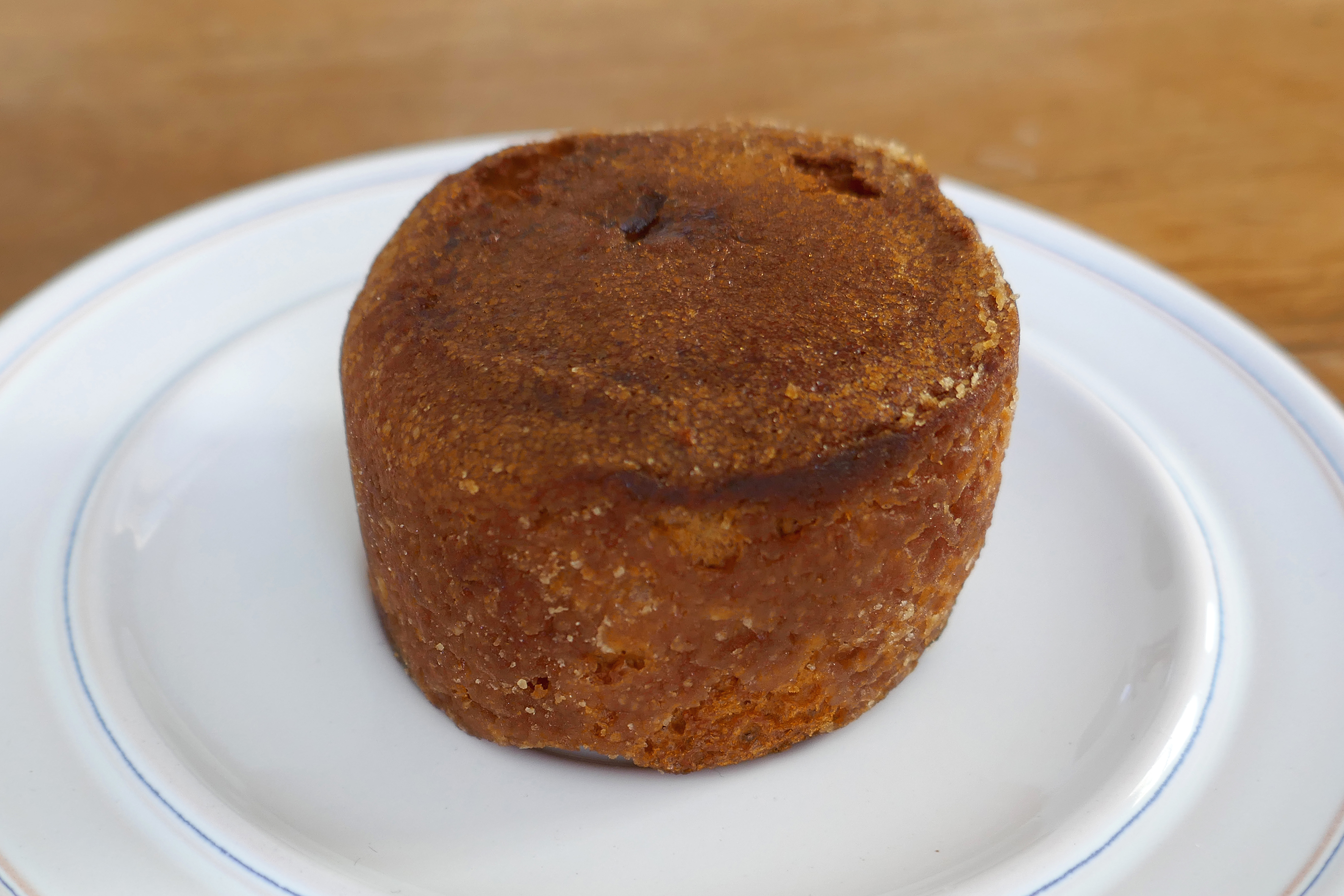
- Nonnette
- Type: Cake
- Course: Dessert
- Place of origin: France
- Main ingredients: Honey
- Ingredients generally used: Orange marmalade

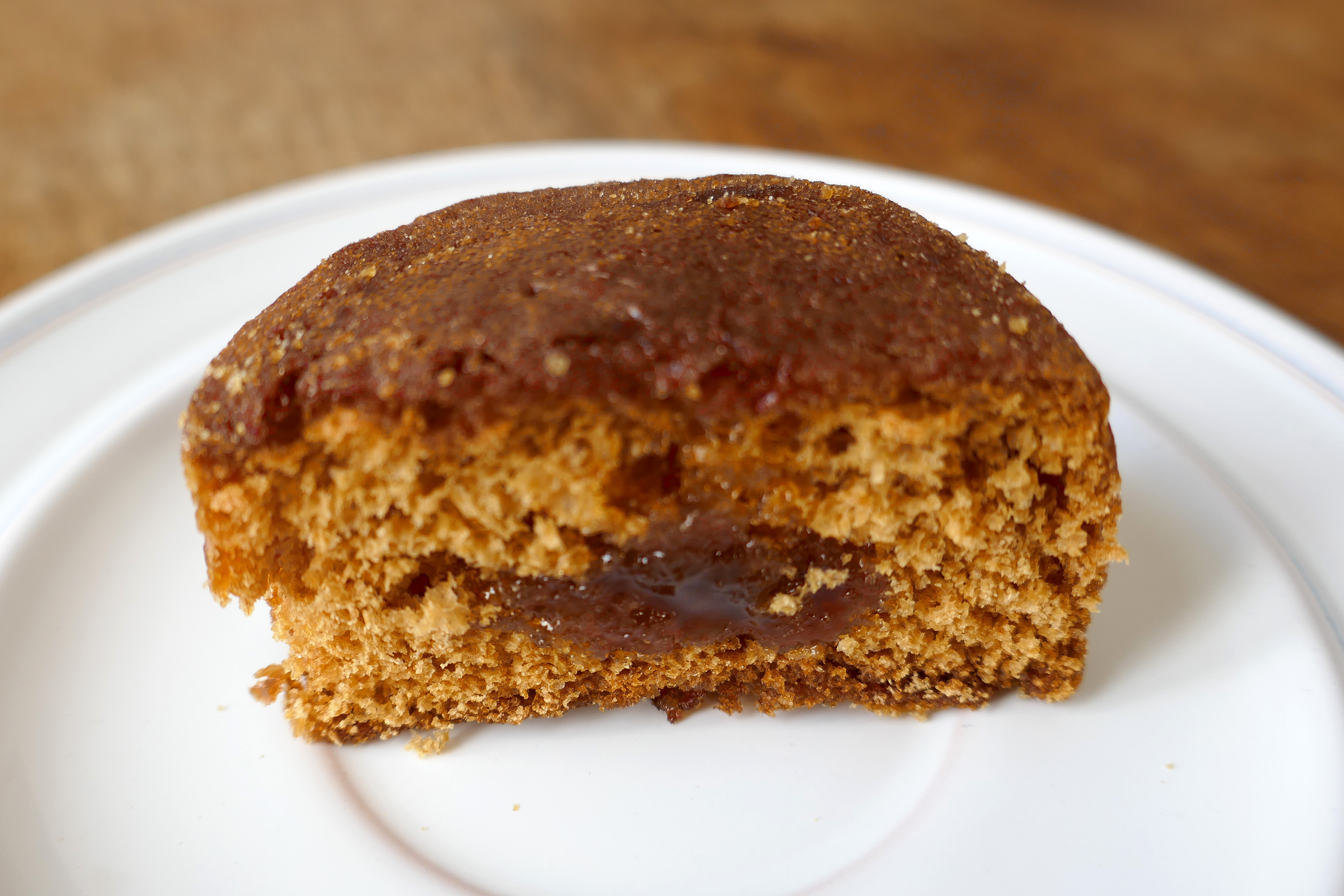
Cut nonnette

The nonnette is a French dessert, translating literally to "little nuns". It is a small gingerbread cake made of honey, rye flour, and usually filled with orange marmalade or honey. It is also typically glazed with a mixtures of egg whites, sugar, and lemon juice, and is frequently served during Christmastime.

Nonnettes tend to have a sticky, moist texture due to their glaze and a spicy taste due to a combination of cardamom, ginger, cinnamon, nutmeg, and allspice.

== History ==
Nonnettes were originally prepared in Dijon, France. According to legend, they were first created by nuns in the abbey during the Middle Ages, thus leading to their namesake. They were popularized by Mulot & Petitjean, a baking company established in Dijon in 1796, who began packaging and selling nonnettes to the general public.

== Gallery ==
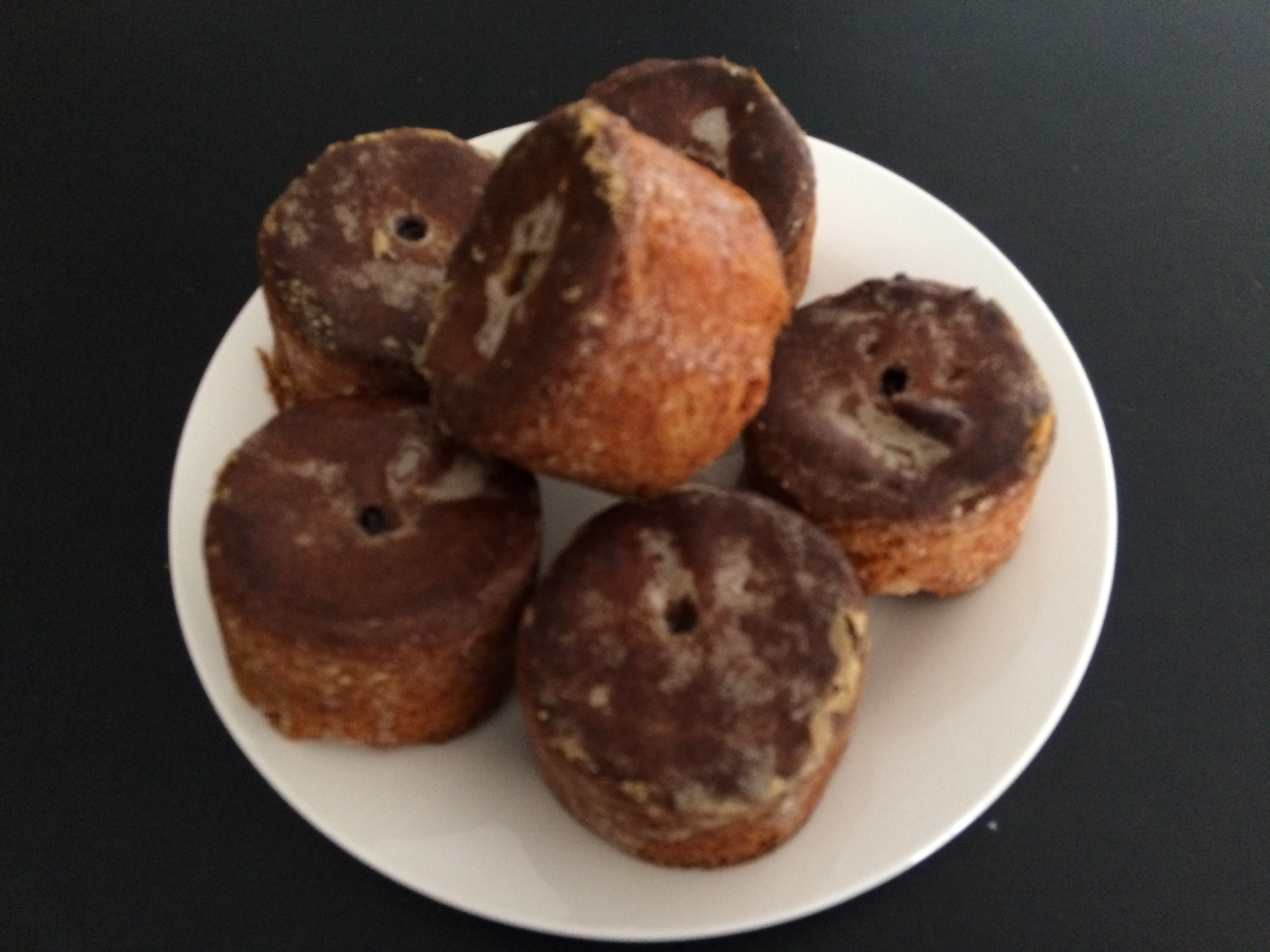
Glazed nonnettes

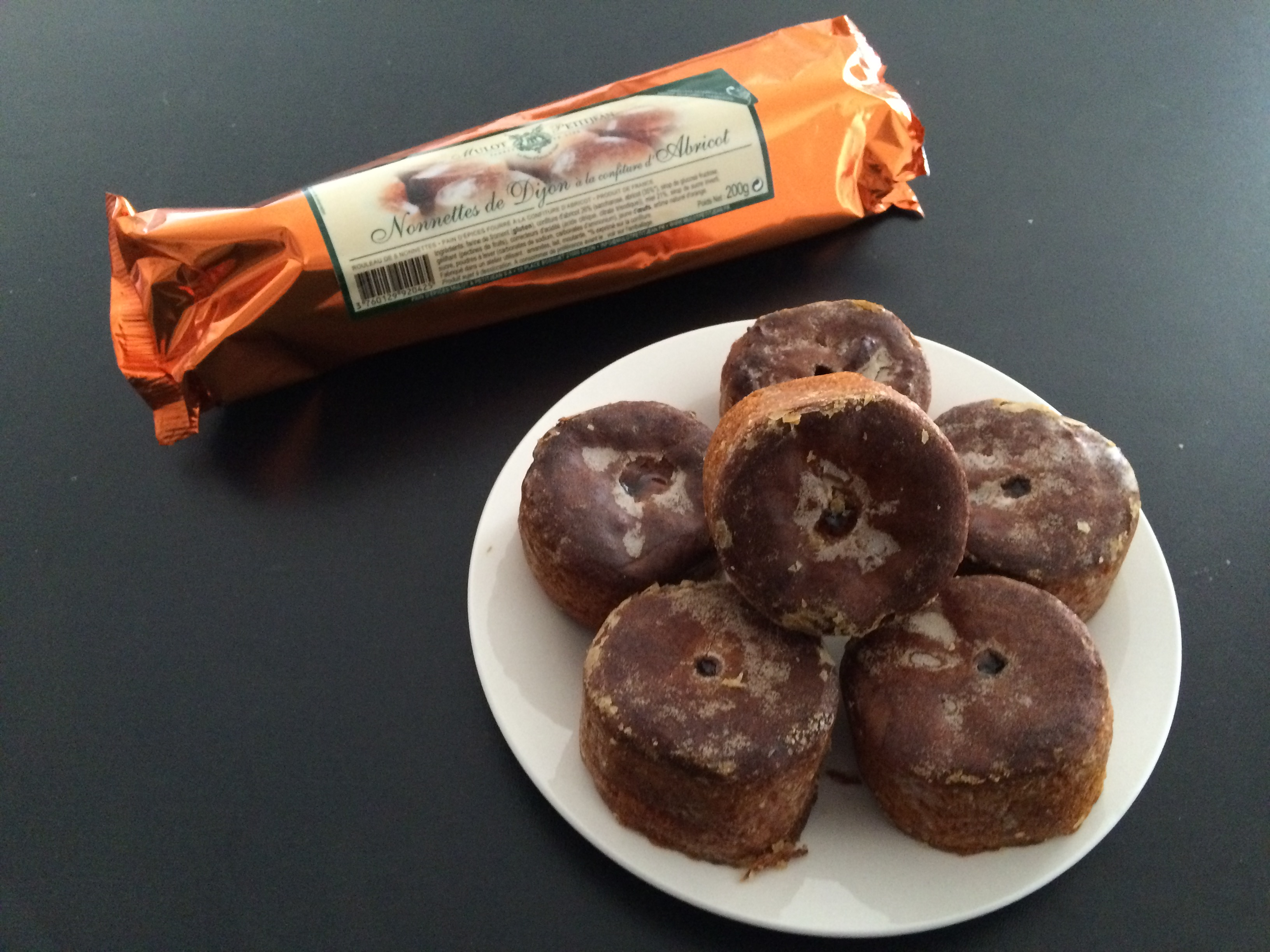
Nonnettes de Dijon created by Mulot & Petitjean

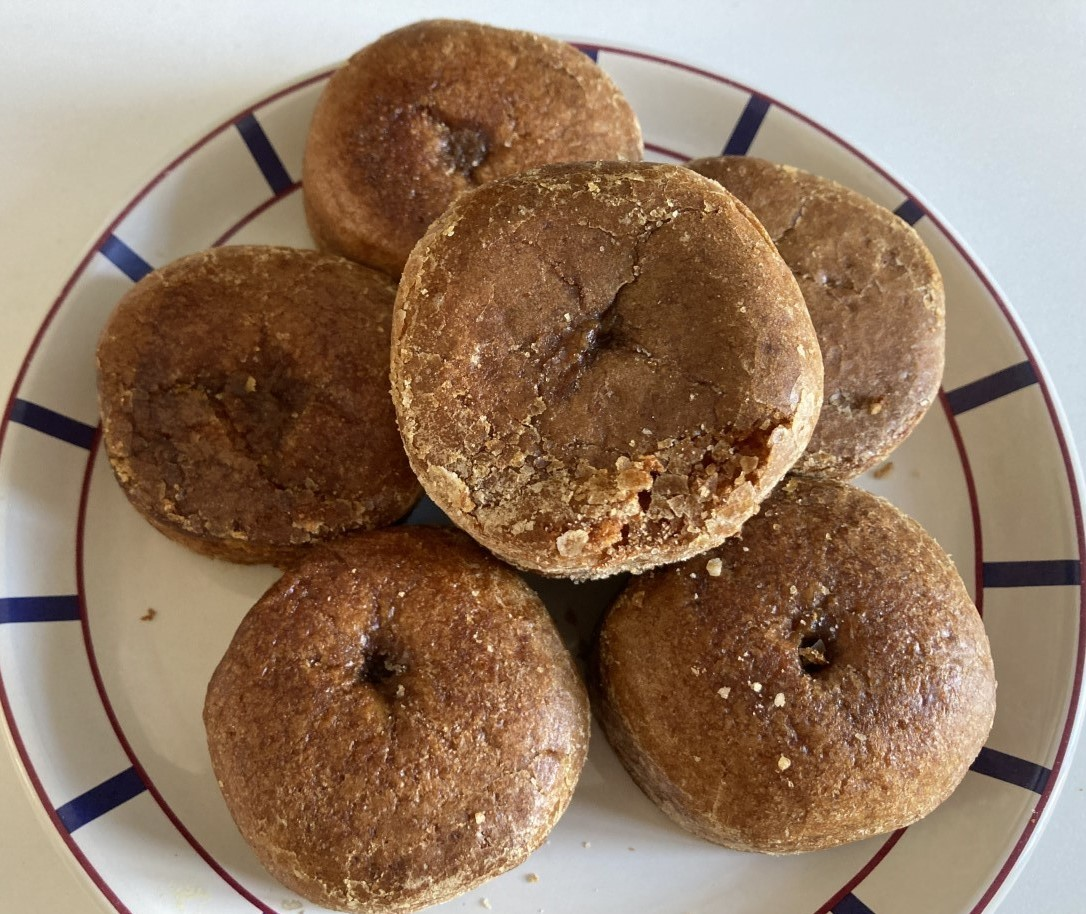
Stacked nonnettes

== See also ==
- List of pastries
- List of French desserts
- List of French dishes
