= Tarte al d'jote =

Belgian culinary specialty

Nivelles (Belgium) speciality, a cheese and chard tart

The Tarte al d'jote is the culinary speciality of the city of Nivelles, Belgium.

The main ingredients is chard (d'jote in the local dialect of Walloon), cream cheese (the boulette of Nivelles), and butter.

In 1980, the Confrérîye dèl Târte al D'jote (Brotherhood of the Tarte al D'jote) was founded with the objective of preserving the cultural, folkloric and gastronomic heritage of Nivelles. One of the missions of the Confrérîye is to promote this speciality, whose first mention traces back to 1218. All year long, its members meet and through blind tasting and well defined criteria, give grades to each producer (grades go from one to five stars). The ceremony of the awarding of the quality labels happens yearly at the beginning of February.
