= Tarte (surname) =

Tarte is a surname. Notable people with the surname include:

- Joseph-Israël Tarte (1848–1907), Canadian politician and journalist
- de:Kevin Tarte (born 1957), American singer in Germany Beauty and the Beast (musical)
- Sandra Tarte, Fijian academic and political commentator
