= Vitréais =

Breton layer cake

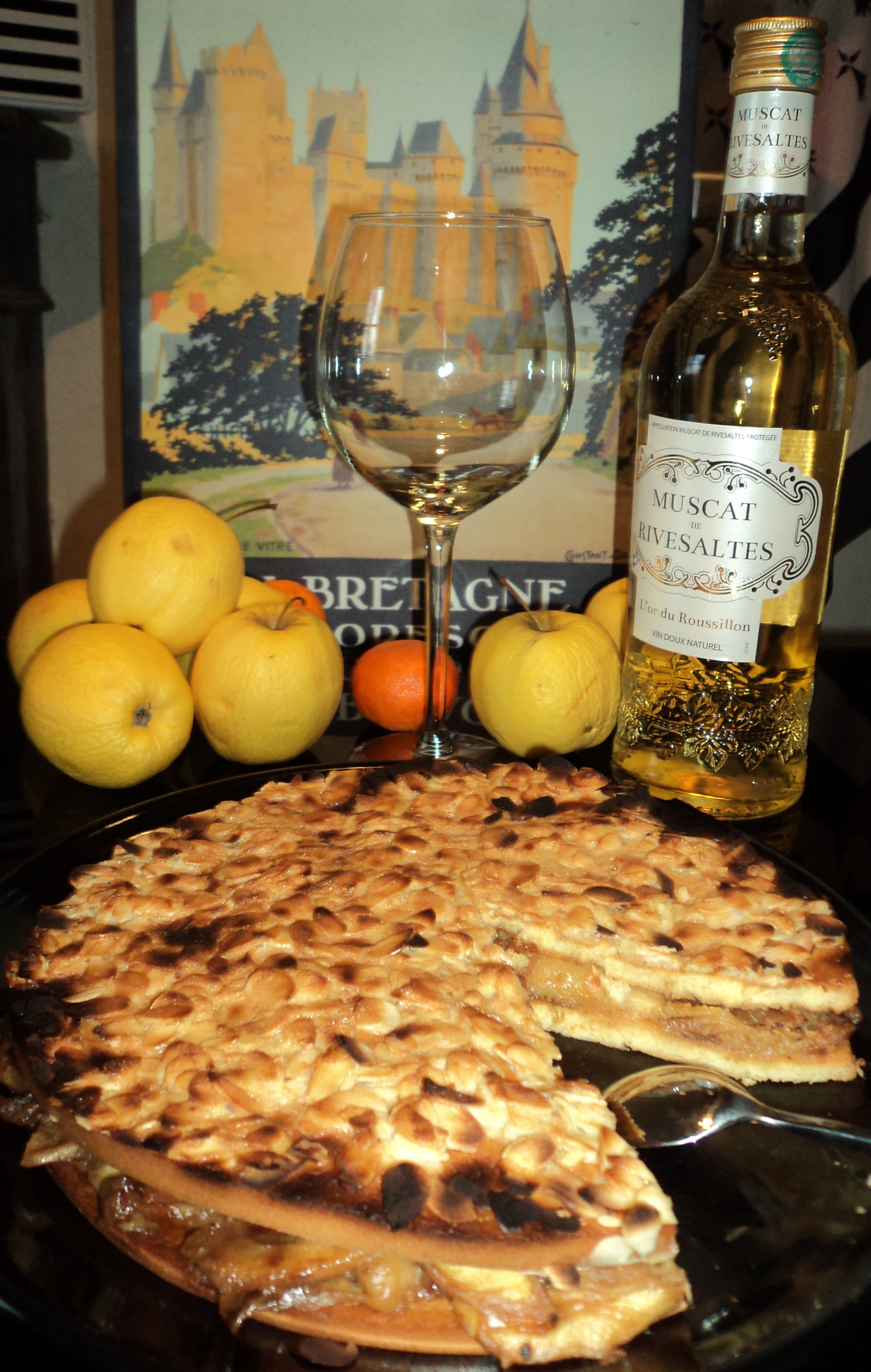
- Type: Cake
- Place of origin: France
- Region or state: Vitré, Ille-et-Vilaine
- Main ingredients: apple, salted butter, sugar, egg, almonds

The Vitréais is a Breton cake. It is a specialty of Vitré, a city in eastern Brittany, France. It is a sponge layer cake made of apples with salted butter caramel, eggs and almonds.

The cake was the winner of a competition held by the local tourism office in 1989, to find a dish to represent the area and its produce. The winner was local baker, Jules Gardan, with the cake being launched for sale in 1990.
