= Sandra Tarte =

Fijiian academic and political commentator

Dr Sandra Tarte

Academic background
- Education: University of Melbourne, Australian National University, University of Tokyo

Academic work
- Institutions: University of the South Pacific

Dr. Sandra Tarte is an academic and political commentator from Fiji.

== Background ==
Tarte grew up in Fiji. She has a BA in Political Science from the University of Melbourne and a PhD in East Asian Studies from Australian National University. She has also studied at the University of Tokyo.

== Career ==
Tarte began her career as a journalist for the Fiji Times and Islands Business magazine.

Since 1995, Tarte has been a lecturer and senior lecturer at the University of the South Pacific in Suva. She is currently Associate Professor and Head of the School of Government, Development and International Affairs in the Faculty of Business and Economics. Prior to her current position she was Head of School of Social Sciences in the Faculty of Arts and Law between 2007 and 2009.

Published books by Tarte include The New Pacific Diplomacy (2015, co-editor with Greg Fry), Japan’s Aid Diplomacy and the Pacific Islands (1998) and Diplomatic Strategies: the Pacific Islands and Japan (1997). She is also the author of numerous academic papers, including publishing in The Contemporary Pacific and Journal of Pacific Studies.

Tarte's academic focus is the Pacific region, specifically regarding regional cooperation and politics. She has consulted for several international organizations including the South Pacific Forum Fisheries Agency, the South Pacific Regional Environment Program, and Greenpeace (Pacific). She is currently on the advisory panel for the Pacific Leadership Forum and a regular speaker with the leadership forum, Leadership Fiji.
