= Tartt =

Tartt is a surname. Notable people with the surname include:

- Colin Tartt (born 1950), English footballer
- Donna Tartt (born 1963), American author
- Jaquiski Tartt (born 1992), American football player
- Ruby Pickens Tartt (1880–1974), American folklorist, writer, and painter
