= Poire belle Hélène =

Pear and ice cream dessert

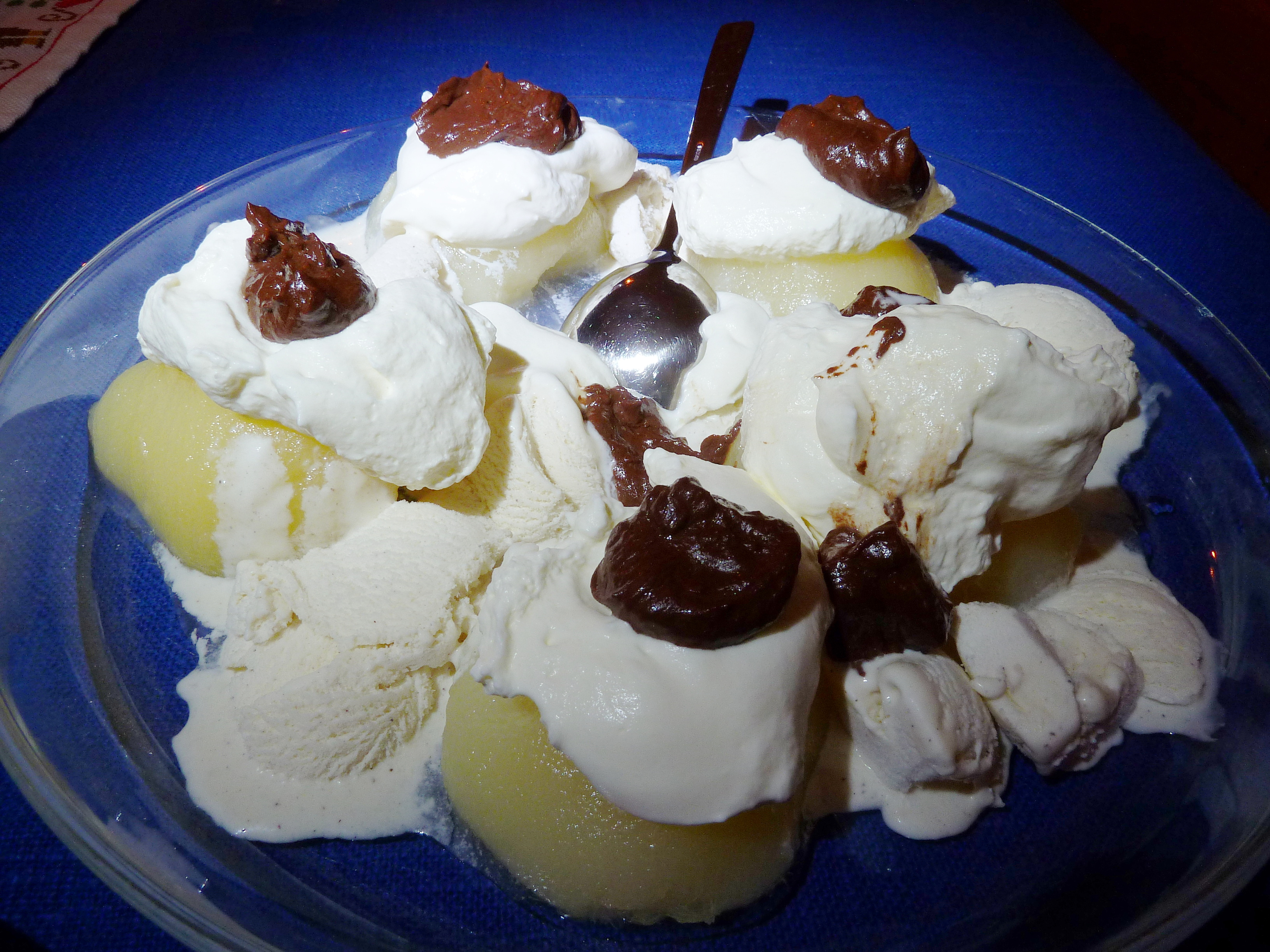
- Alternative names: Birne Helene
- Course: Dessert
- Place of origin: France
- Created by: Auguste Escoffier
- Serving temperature: Contrasting (hot pears, cold ice cream)
- Main ingredients: Pear and ice cream

Poire belle Hélène (pronounced [pwaʁ bɛl elɛn]) is a dessert made from pears poached in sugar syrup and served with vanilla ice cream and chocolate syrup. According to the traditional account, it was created around 1864 by Auguste Escoffier and named after the operetta La belle Hélène by Jacques Offenbach. Simpler versions replace poached pears with canned pears and sliced almonds.
