= Tarte des Alpes =

Tart originating from the southern Alps

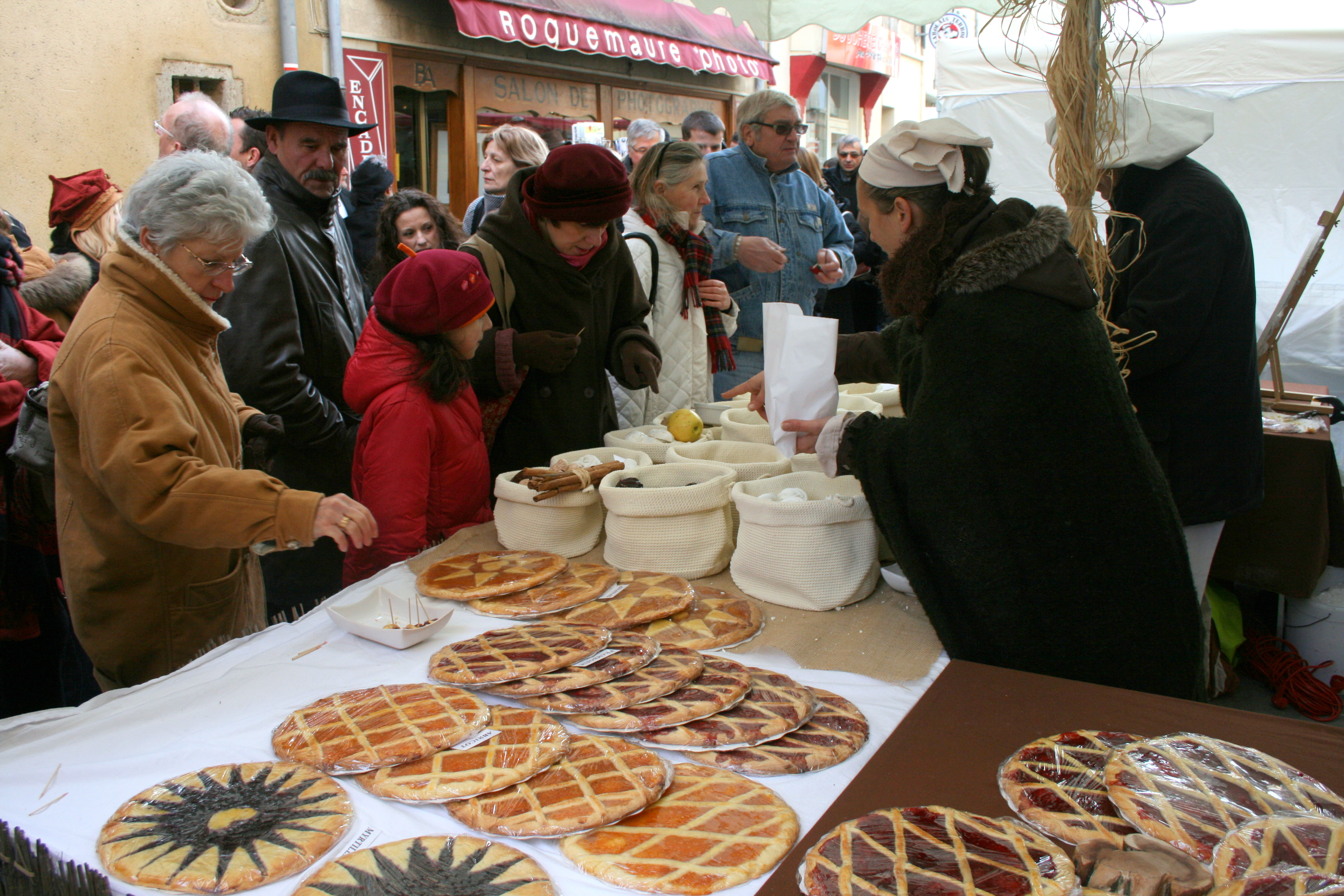
Tartes des Alpes being sold in the market in Roquemaure

Tarte des Alpes is a tart found specifically in, and originating from the Southern Alps. It is made with pastry and is filled with jam and covered with lattice patterns of pastry. Handmade by pastry chefs in the Hautes-Alpes and the Alpes-de-Haute-Provence, or industrially made by some manufacturers, it has the advantage of being able to be kept for months without losing its flavour.

== Origin and history ==
The Tarte des Alpes is a speciality of the Valgaudemar Valley in the Écrins National Park, where it is called "pie of the valley" or "country pie". An almost identical version can be found in the Champsaur or in the Queyras regions, where it is called "Queyras pie".

It was originally made in winter, using fruit jams from the summer. A creamy plum filling was used for the pie, with raspberry or blueberry jam added. Today this pie, with its decoration of strips of pastry, is one of the emblems of the regional gastronomy of the Southern Alps.

== Ingredients ==
Tarte des Alpes is made from a sweet shortcrust pastry and jam. Over time, the jams or jellies filling the pie have diversified and there are now many fruit flavours. The main ones are blueberry, raspberry, apricot, prune, strawberry, fig, lemoncurd, cherry, and forest fruits.

== Preparation ==
The pastry is made from flour, butter, caster sugar, eggs, salt and yeast. The choice of jam or jelly is a matter of taste; usually, a little pectin is added. Once the pastry has been rolled out, it is placed in a pie dish and filled with jam or fruit jelly. The strips of pastry for the covering are generally 3mm thick, 5mm wide and form a criss-cross pattern.

== Consumption and conservation ==
These pies can be eaten hot or cold; after meals; at breakfast; with coffee or afternoon tea. They can be kept for two or three months, all the while retaining their original flavour.
