= Tarto =

Tarto is a surname. Notable people with the surname include:

- Enn Tarto (1938–2021), Estonian politician
- Joe Tarto (1902–1986), American musician

== See also ==
- Tartu (Võro: Tarto), city in Estonia
