= List of Chinese bakery products =

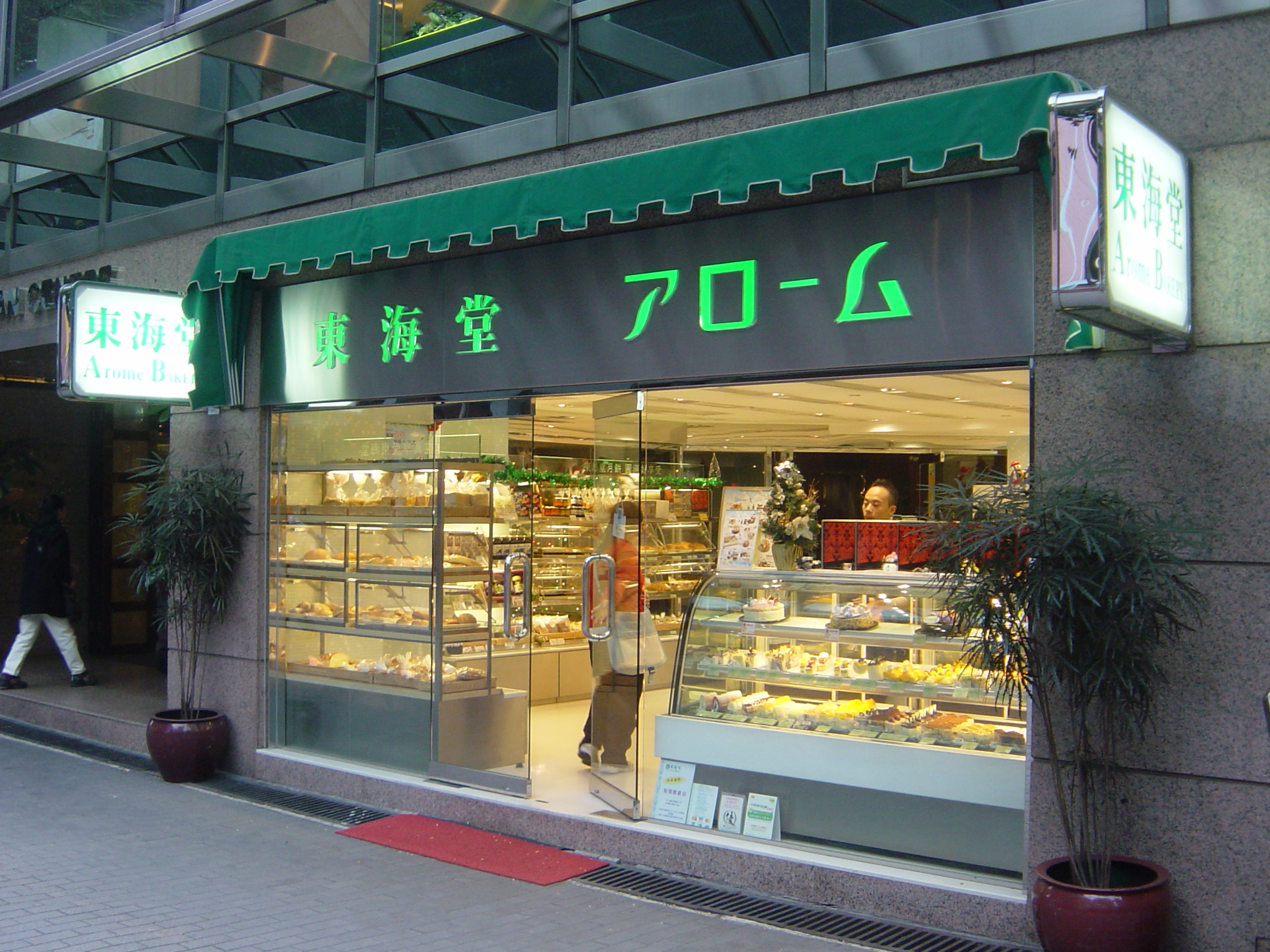
Arome Bakery in Hong Kong

Chinese bakery products (Chinese: 中式糕點; pinyin: Zhōngshì gāodiǎn; lit. 'Chinese style cakes and snacks' or Chinese: 唐餅; pinyin: Táng bǐng; lit. 'Tang-style baked goods') consist of pastries, cakes, snacks, and desserts of largely Chinese origin, though some are derived from Western baked goods. Some of the most common "Chinese" bakery products include mooncakes, sun cakes (Beijing and Taiwan varieties), egg tarts, and wife cakes.

Chinese bakeries are present in countries with ethnic Chinese people, and are particularly common in Chinatowns. The establishments may also serve tea, coffee, and other drinks.

== Bakery types ==
There are regional differences in cities with large Chinese presences, particularly those in Asia like Singapore, Kuala Lumpur, Penang, Ipoh, Jakarta, Manila, and Bangkok. Bakery fillings especially may be influenced by Indonesia, Malaysia, the Philippines, or Thailand. In North America, the largest Chinatowns, such as San Francisco, Vancouver, New York, and Toronto, have the widest range of offerings, including influences from France, Italy, Japan, and Mexico.

There are also large overlaps in the products sold at Hong Kong-style and Taiwan-style bakeries; there nevertheless remain significant differences between these two major types. For instance, bread cake and pineapple cake were developed in Taiwan-style bakeries, while the cocktail bun and pineapple bun is a Hong Kong style product. Hong Kong bakeries have more Western influence due to the 150 years of British rule that ended in 1997, and the nearby presence of the former Portuguese colony of Macau. Taiwan-style bakeries may have more influence from American bakery, Japanese bakery, or Korean bakery styles.

Chinese bakeries show considerable variation within mainland China due to the cultural and geographical diversity of the country. For example, Furu bing (腐乳饼) are sold in the Chaoshan region, while nang (馕) is sold in Xinjiang. Shanghainese bakeries are strongly influenced by European bakeries, particularly French and German traditions.

Some bakeries also offer small snacks traditionally associated with dim sum cuisine. There is considerable overlap between these categories.

== Eastern-origin pastry ==
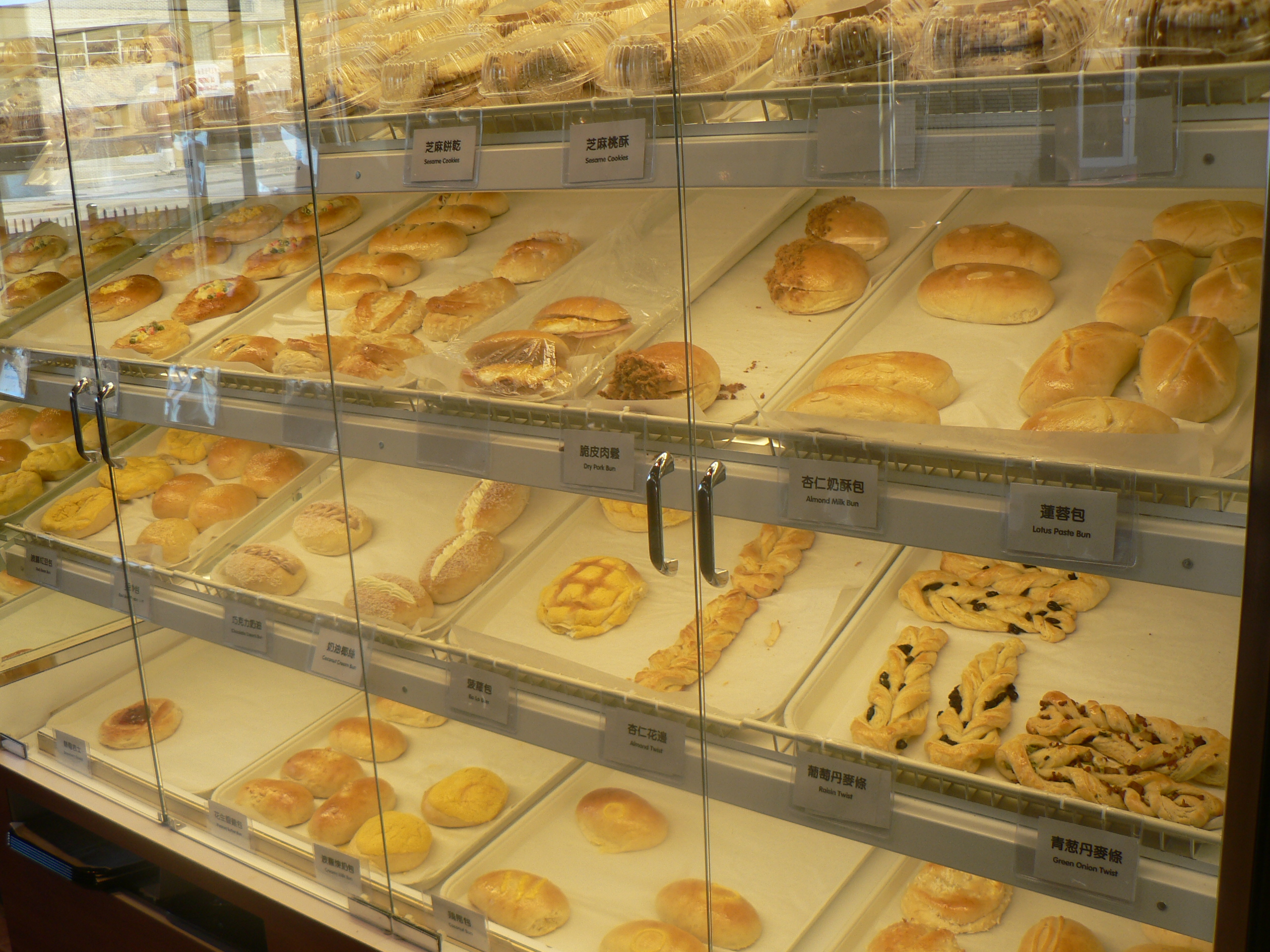
Eastern-origin pastry section

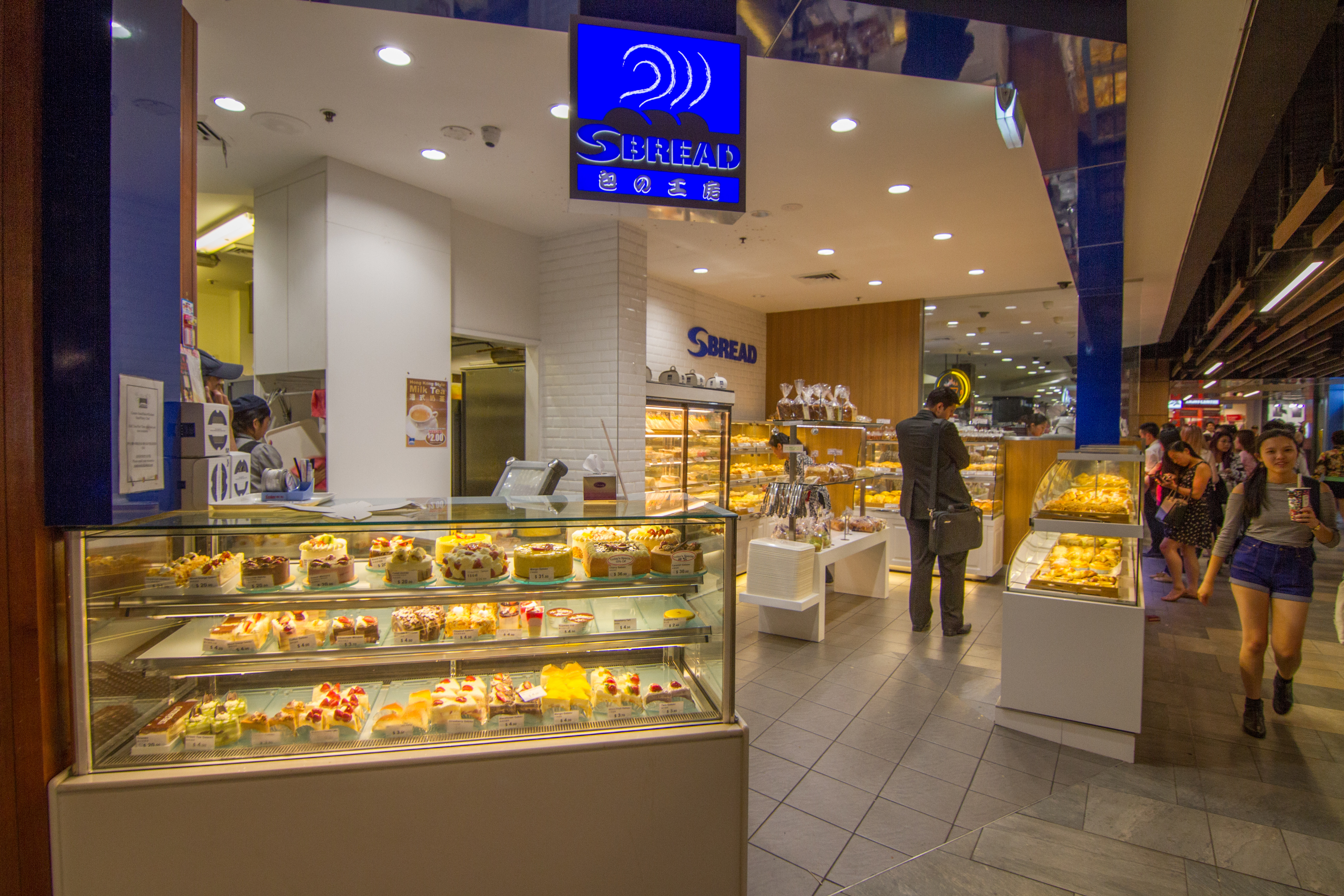
Chinese bakery in Sydney, Australia

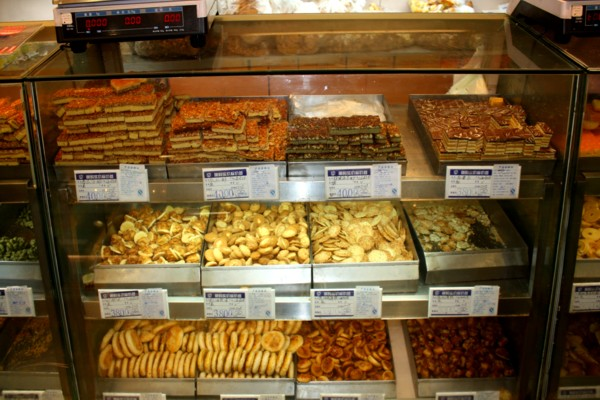
Cookie display in Shanghai

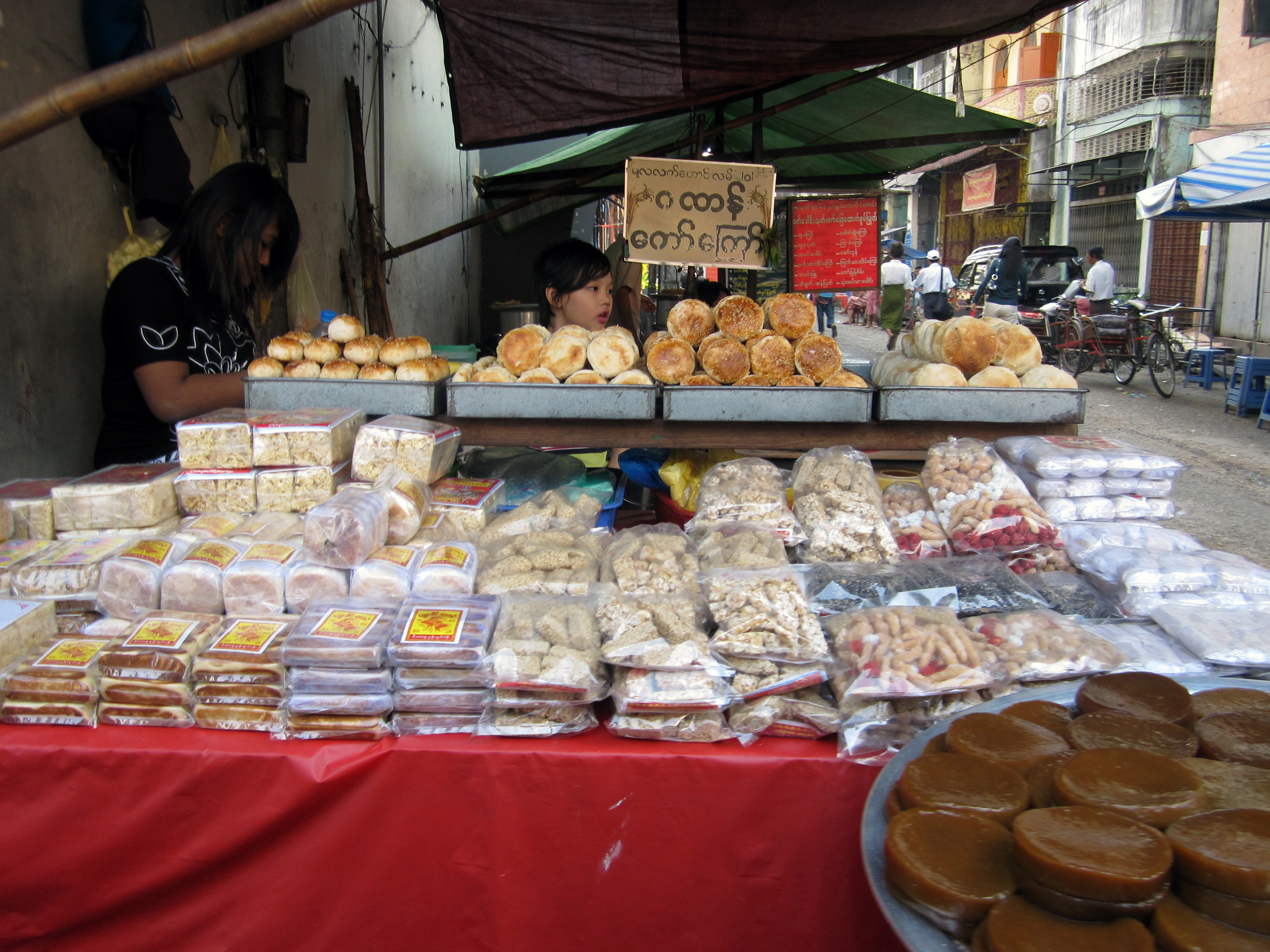
Sidewalk display in Yangon, Myanmar

Some types of steamed or baked buns have a very similar appearance, making it difficult to determine what they have been filled with. Informal de facto standards have developed for indicating the filling by some external mark on the buns, such as a colored dot or a sprinkling of a few sesame seeds.

Unless otherwise indicated, most of the following foods are baked. Some foods are steamed, boiled, deep-fried, pan-fried, or do not require further cooking at all.

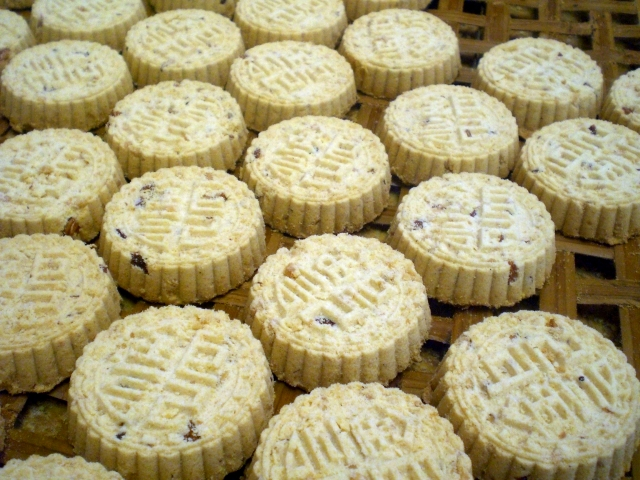
- Chinese almond biscuit
  Almond biscuit – Golden, delicate cookie with a light almond taste
- Bakpia – Round, flat, flaky or soft dough bun, with various fillings
- Banana roll – Rolled flavored glutinous rice, not cooked any further after preparation
- Baozi – Generic term for a steamed yeast bun, with various types of fillings
- Beef bun – Usually filled with ground beef, sometimes flavored with curry; sometimes sprinkled with black sesame or poppy seeds
- Black sesame rice cake – Flat glutinous rice patties filled with black sesame paste
- Cha siu bao – Steamed or baked bun, filled with roast pork and optionally, sweet onions; sometimes indicated by a red dot
- Chicken bun – Steamed or baked bun, usually filled with shredded chicken and black mushroom slivers; sometimes sprinkled with a few white sesame seeds
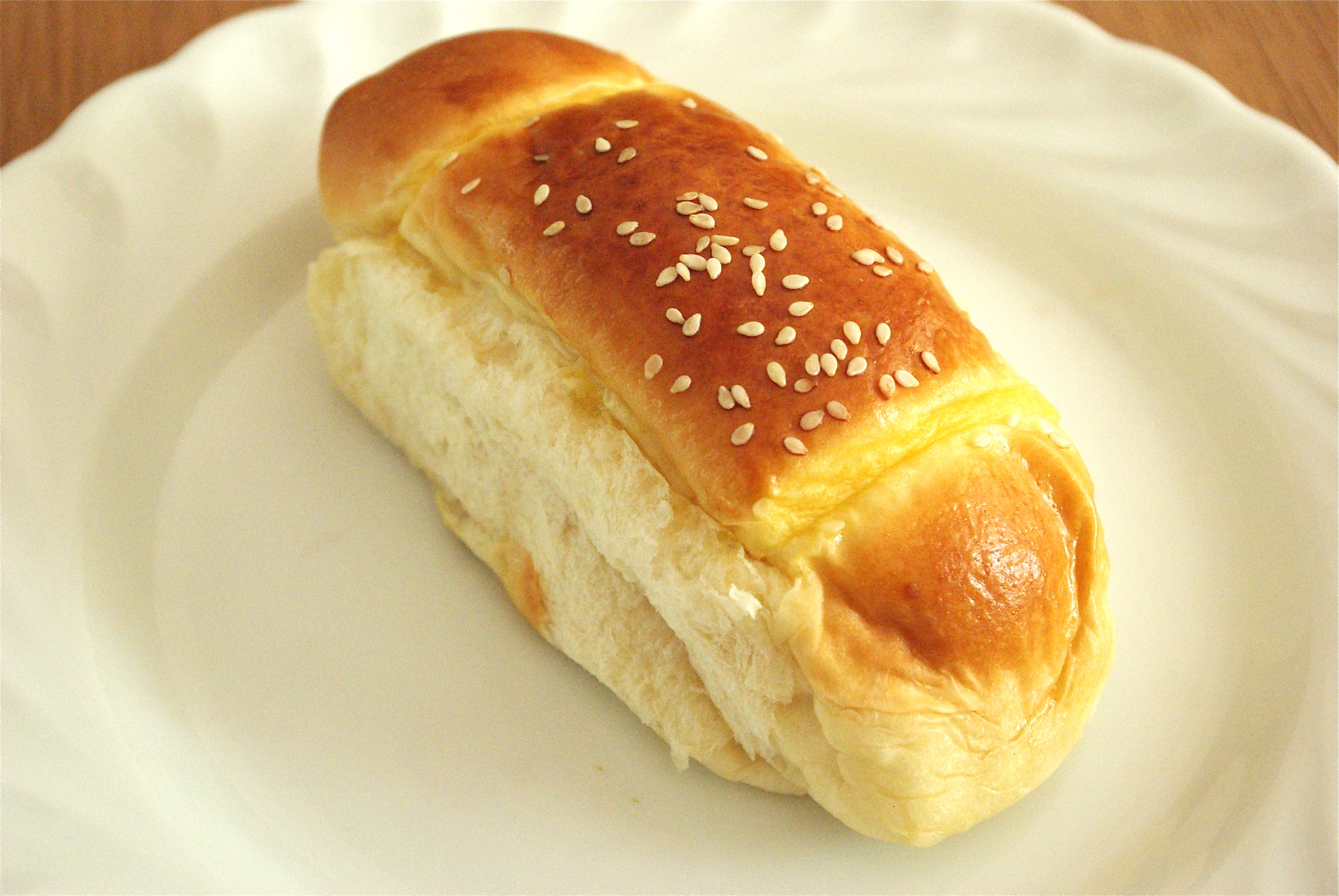
- Cocktail bun
  Cocktail bun – Usually filled with a sweet shredded coconut paste
- Curry beef turnover – Flaky pastry crust with a curried ground beef filling
- Dowry cake – Large sponge cake, often filled with lotus seed paste
- Fa gao – Yeast rice flour cupcake or sheet cake, fermented overnight to develop flavor before steaming
- Ham and egg bun – Bun filled with a sheet of scrambled egg and a slice of ham
- Huangqiao sesame cake – Small dough balls rolled in sesame seeds
- Husband cake (老公饼)
- Jin deui or zi ma qiu – Deep-fried hollow ball of glutinous rice, coated with sesame seeds, and optionally with a sweet red bean or a savory meat filling
- Lotus seed bun – Steamed bun filled with lotus seed paste
- Mahua or fried dough twist – Very different from youtiao, with a more solid texture
- Mantou – Plain, slightly sweet, steamed wheat flour yeast buns (unfilled); the traditional basis for Chinese steamed buns (baozi) with fillings
- Mooncake – Traditional variations are heavy lotus seed paste filled pastry, sometimes with 1–2 egg yolks in its centre. Modern variations have altered both the pastry crust and filling for more variety. These are specially featured at the Mid-Autumn Festival, but may be available year-round.
- Nuomici – Sweet glutinous rice dumpling with different fillings such as sweet red bean paste, black sesame paste, mango, and peanuts
- Osmanthus cake – Flower-scented sweet cake
- Paper-wrapped cake – Spongy and light, these are plain chiffon cakes wrapped in paper; sometimes simply called "sponge cake"
- Peanut butter bun – Sweet bun filled with peanut butter
- Pineapple bun – Does not contain pineapples, but derived its name from the "pineapple-like" criss-crossed scored appearance of the top surface, which is a tender crispy, sweet, golden crust. The pineapple bun may be filled with custard or red bean paste.
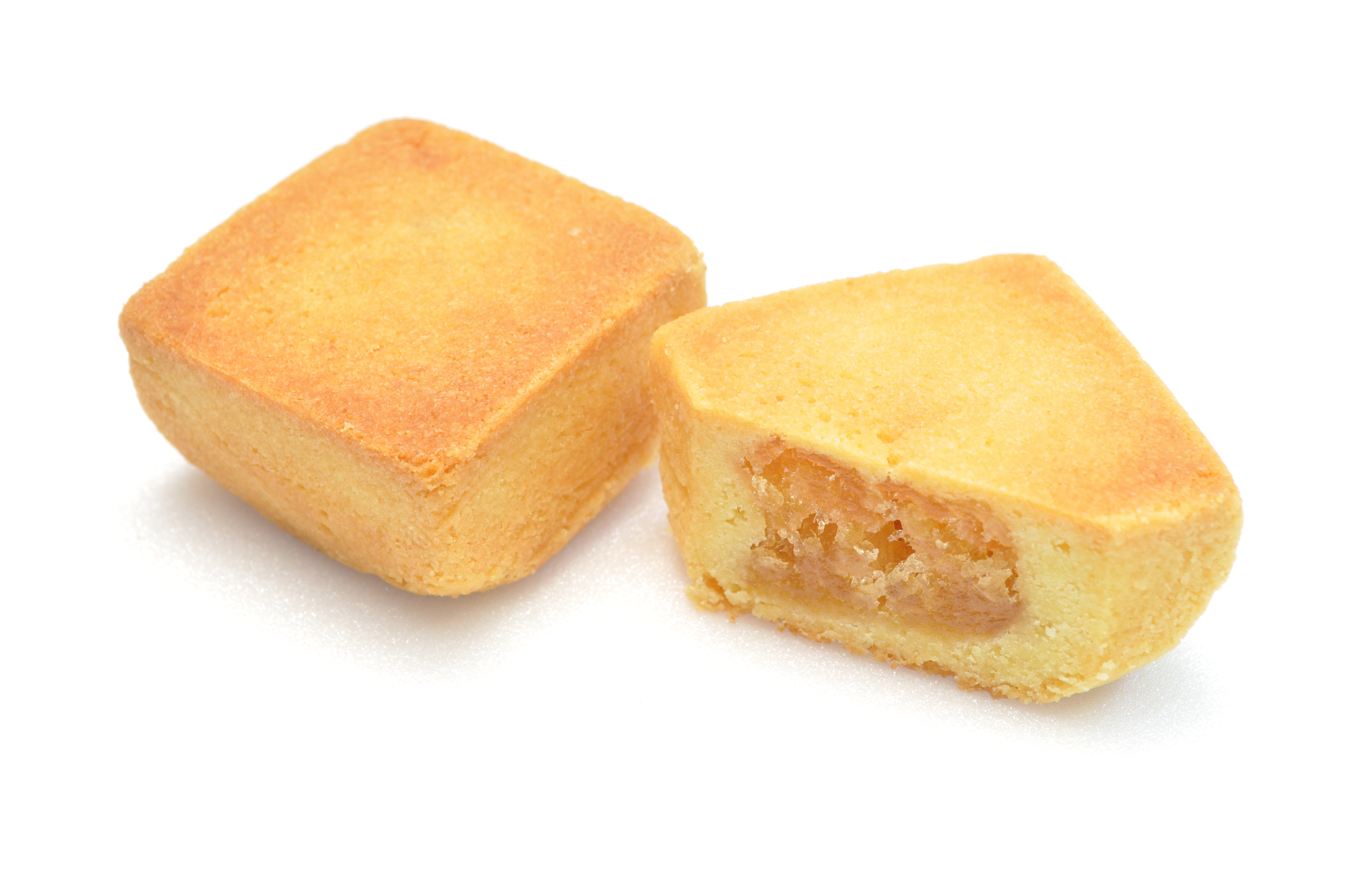
- Pineapple cake
  Pineapple cake – Round or rectangular block shaped shortcrust pastry filled with pineapple jam. (凤梨酥; 鳳梨酥; fènglí sū)
- Rousong bun or "pork fu" bun – Dried fried fluffy meat fibers in a bun, sometimes with whipped cream added
- Sausage bun, also called "hot dog bun" – Steamed or baked bun, always includes a piece of sausage or hot dog
- Sachima – Sweet Manchu pastry made from flour, butter, and rock sugar; consists of crispy, fluffy fried strands of batter
- Sou – Triangular, puffy flaky pastry with various fillings
- Taro bun – Baked or steamed bun filled with sweet taro paste; sometimes indicated by a few sliced almonds on top
- White sugar sponge cake – Steamed cake made with sweetened rice flour
- Wife cake – Round flaky pastry with a translucent white winter melon paste centre
- Youtiao or "Chinese cruller" – Deep-fried dough strips
- Zongzi – Sticky rice dumplings wrapped in bamboo or lotus leaves, often filled with savory meat, red bean paste, peanuts, or other fillings

== Western-influenced pastry ==
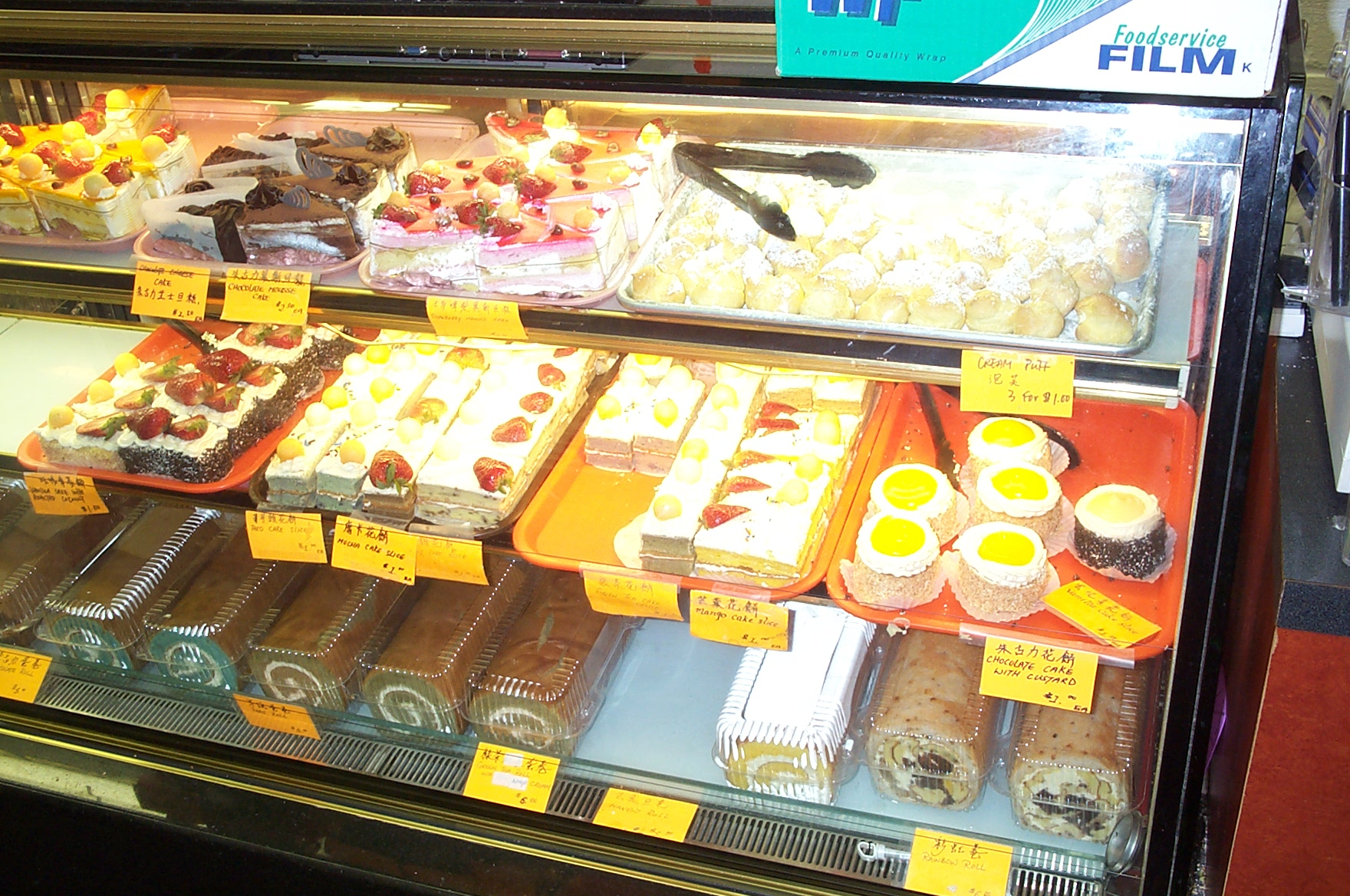
Western-influenced pastry section

Some Western-influenced baked goods are essentially identical to their Western counterparts, whereas others differ subtly (for example, by being less sweet). The items listed here are often found in Chinese bakeries, in at least some parts of the world.

- Almond cake – Light cupcake, coated with whipped cream, and then rolled in thinly sliced or shredded almond chips
- Cream bun – Usually elliptical-shaped yeast bun, filled with whipped cream or butter, sprinkled with shredded dried coconut
- Cream horn – Long tapered cone of puff pastry, filled with whipped cream, and sometimes fruit or jam
- Eclair – Very similar to the French original
- Egg tart – Delicate pastry tart with a lightly sweet golden egg custard filling; probably influenced by the Portuguese tart pasteis de nata
- Napoleon – Layers of puff pastry and creamy filling or jam
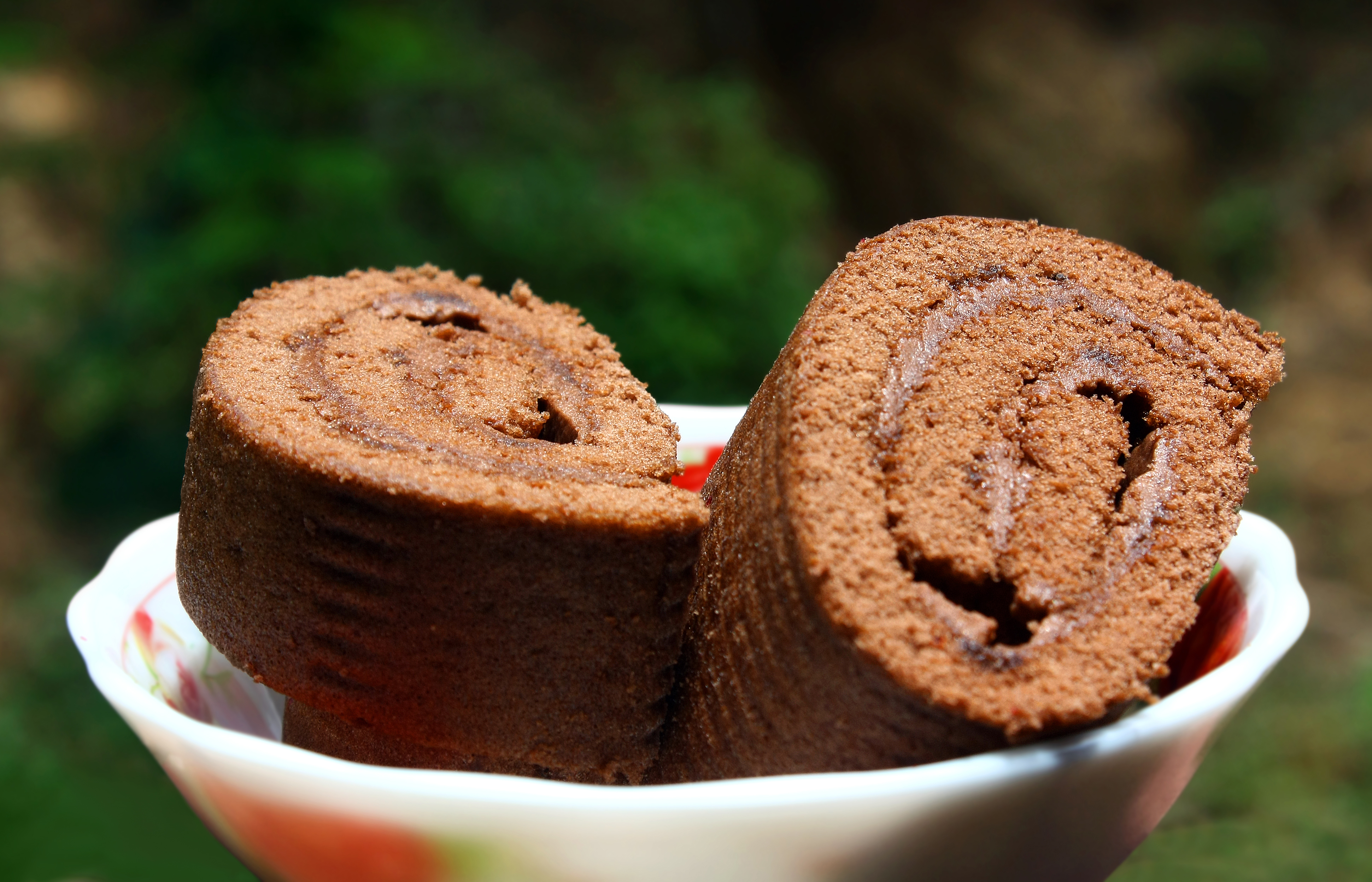
- Swiss roll
  Swiss roll – Rolls made just like a Portuguese roll torta; the creamy layer may be sweetened cream, chocolate, pear, or lemon paste

== Drinks ==
- Bubble tea (boba) – Large tapioca pearls served in tea with milk
- Suanmeitang – Plum-based beverage
- Milk tea – Black tea sweetened with sweet evaporated milk
- Tea – Aromatic drink made from water boiled and poured over tea leaves
- Yuanyang – Blend of tea and coffee, popular in Hong Kong
- Soy milk – Plant-based drink, a product of soybeans

== See also ==
- List of baked goods
- List of buns
- List of pastries
