= Croustade =

Culinary term for a pastry shell or a French pie or tarte

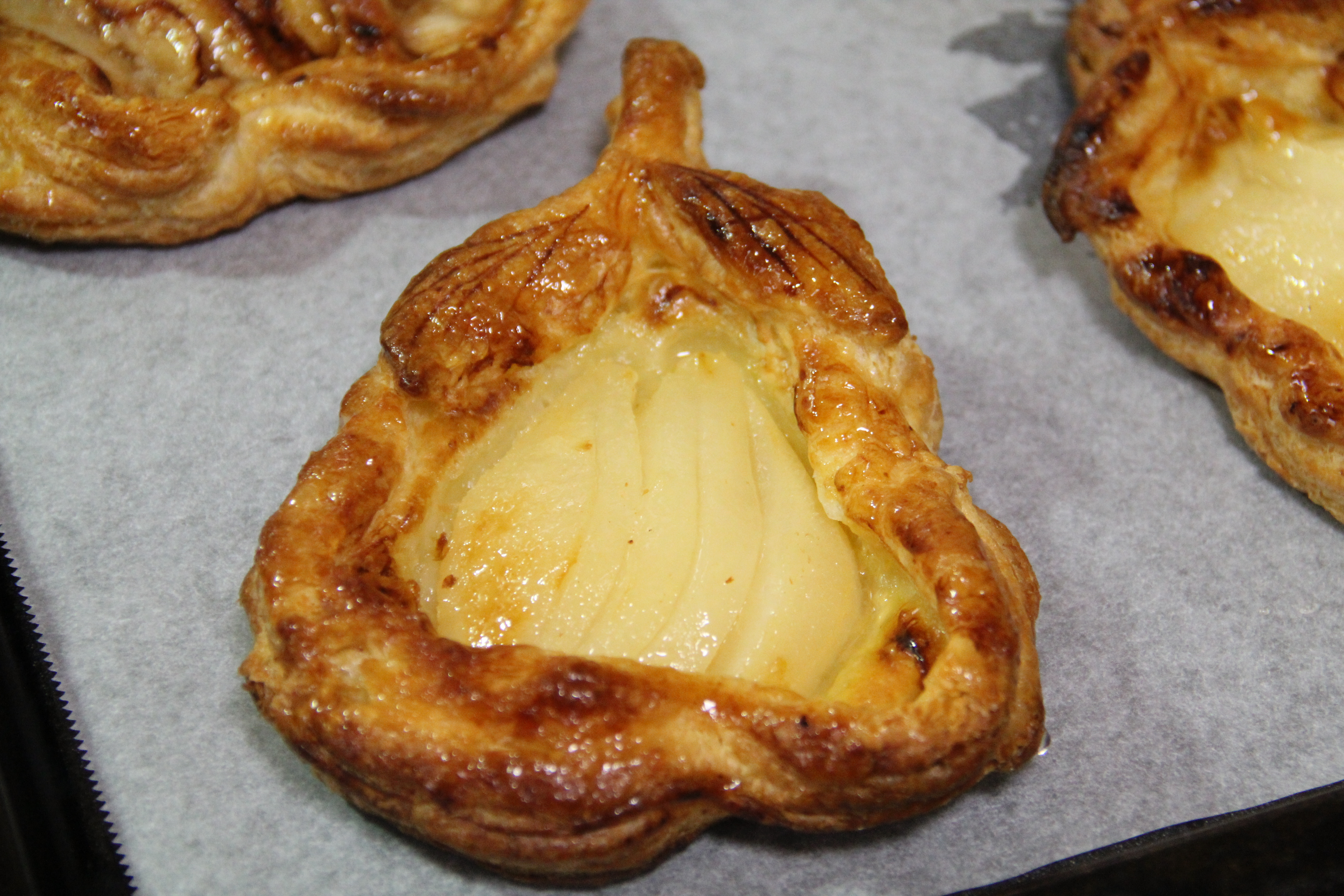
- Pear-shaped croustade
- Place of origin: France
- Main ingredients: Flaky pastry or puff pastry

A croustade (Occitan: crostada) is either a small, crispy shell that can hold both sweet and savory fillings, or a selection of pastry-based pies, tarts or desserts. They are usually made of flaky pastry or puff pastry, but there are also bread croustades (croustade de pain de mie), potato croustades (petites croustades en pommes de terre duchesse), rice, semolina and vermicelli croustades, among others.

This French culinary term is derived from the Occitan and Catalan term crostada, which derive from Italian crostata, and the English term custard derives from it.

== French variations ==
- La Croustade aux Pommes — puff pastry filled with apples
- Croustade du Couserans — puff pastry pie filled with fruit
- Croustade avignonnaise à la viande — a puff pastry meat pie
