= Sou (pastry) =

Type of food

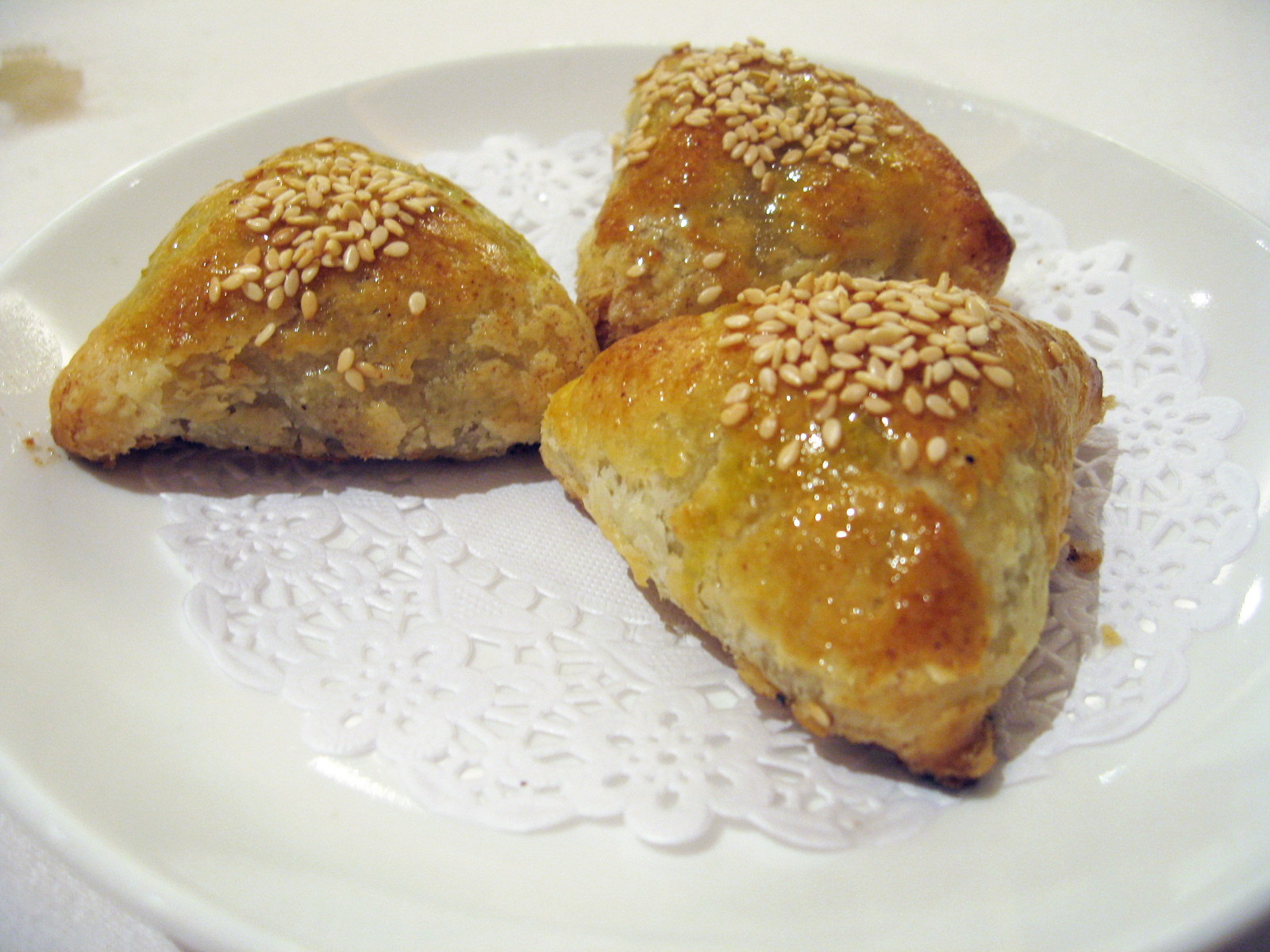
- Type: Pastry
- Place of origin: China

Sou
- Chinese: 酥
Transcriptions
Standard Mandarin
- Hanyu Pinyin: sū
Yue: Cantonese
- Jyutping: sou1
Southern Min
- Hokkien POJ: so͘

Sou is a type of dried flaky Chinese pastry, which use Chinese flaky pastry, found in a variety of Chinese cuisines.

== Dim sum ==
In dim sum restaurants, char siu sou (叉燒酥) is the most common version available. Other varieties may include century egg and lotus seed paste. These are commonly found in Hong Kong or Singapore in Asia. They may occasionally be found in some overseas Chinatowns.

== Shanghai cuisine ==
In Shanghai cuisine, a number of dried varieties are available, such as peanut sou (花生酥), green bean sou (綠豆酥) or walnut sou (核桃酥). People often buy them for souvenirs in boxed forms.

== Gallery ==
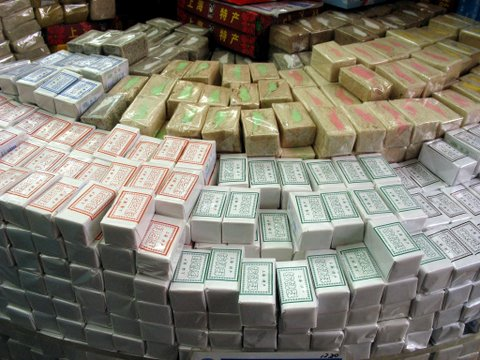
Boxes of Shanghai sou

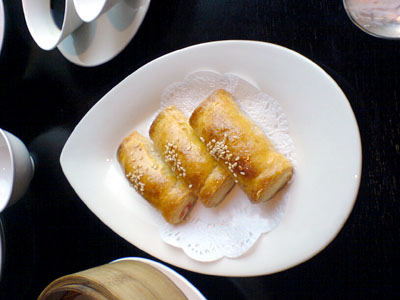

== See also ==
- Chinese flaky pastry
- Char siu bao
- Ox-tongue pastry
