= Chinese flaky pastry =

Form of unleavened pastry used in Chinese pastries

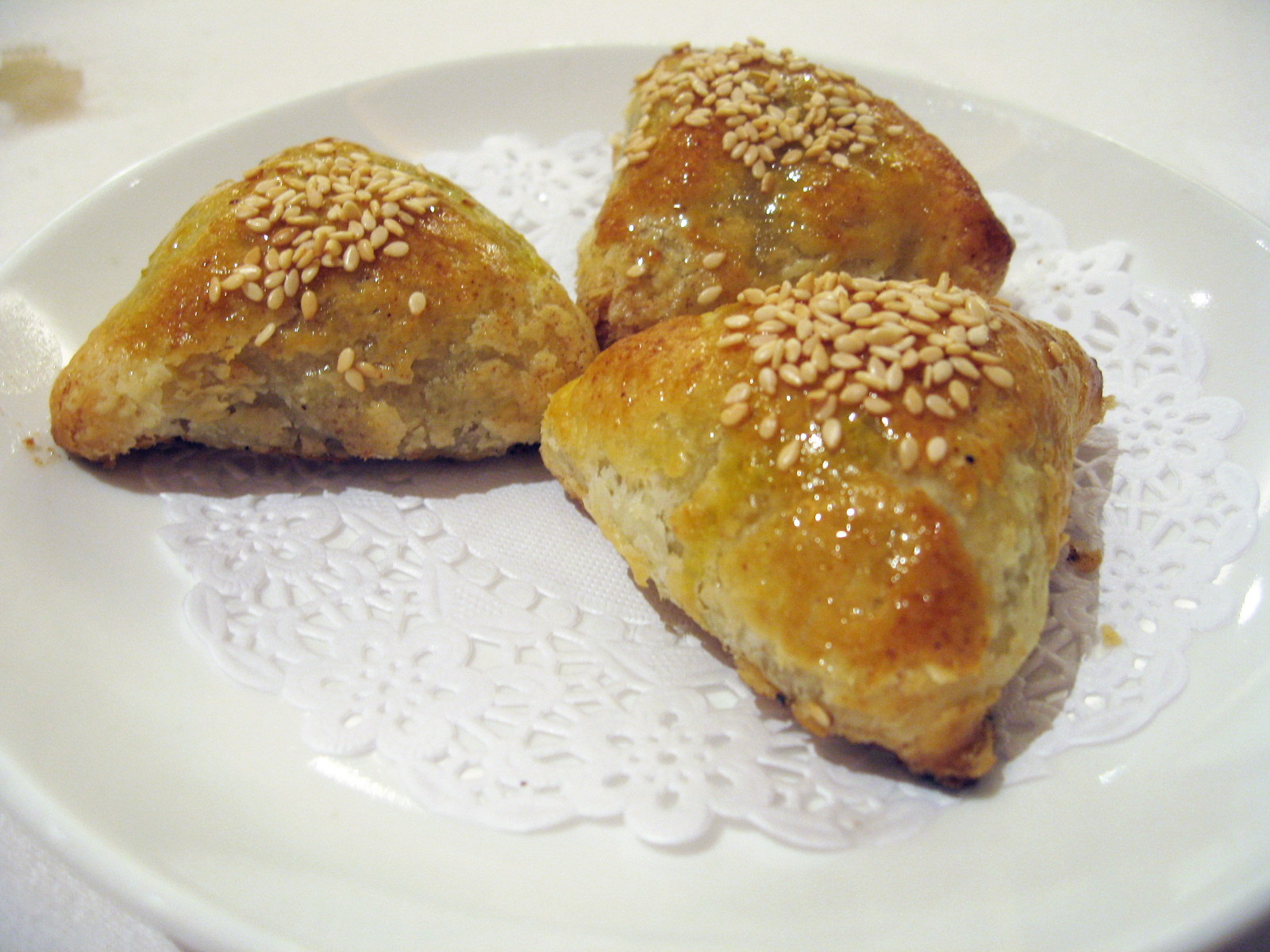
- Char siu sou uses Chinese flaky pastry
- Alternative names: Chinese puff pastry
- Type: Pastry
- Place of origin: China
- Main ingredients: Flour, shortening (traditionally lard)
- Variations: Huaiyang-style; Cantonese-style
- Similar dishes: Flaky pastry

Chinese flaky pastry (Chinese: 中式酥皮; also known as Chinese puff pastry) is a form of flaky pastry used in traditional Chinese pastries that are invariably called subing (soubeng in Cantonese). There are two primary forms, Huaiyang-style (淮揚酥皮) and Cantonese-style pastry (廣式酥皮). Huaiyang-style pastry is used to make delicacies such as Shanghainese 'crab shell' pastries (蟹殼黃) while Cantonese-style pastry is used to make pastries like sweetheart cakes.

== Method ==
Both forms require creating two doughs: a 'water' dough and an 'oil' dough. The 'water' dough requires mixing of flour, oil or fat, and warm water at a ratio of 10:3:4, while the 'oil' dough requires direct mixing of flour and oil or fat at a ratio of 2:1 or 3:1, which provides for a crumbly mouthfeel and rich flavour. The two types of dough are systematically folded and rolled out to form multiple laminated layers of flaky dough, filled with various fillings, and baked at a temperature between 180 and 220 °C (356 and 428 °F).

== See also ==
- List of pastries
- Flaky pastry
- Puff pastry
- Types of pastry
