= Sweetheart cake =

Traditional Cantonese pastry

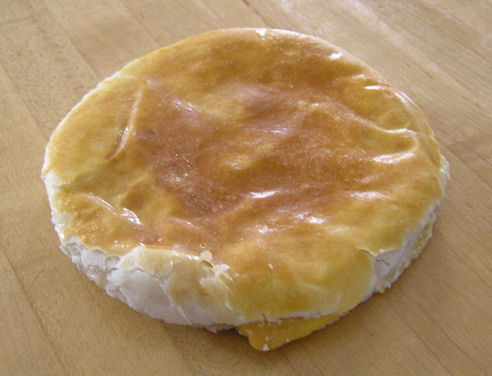
- Alternative names: Wife cake, Lo por beng, Lao po bing, 老婆餅,（Chinese name (simplified)）老婆饼
- Type: Cake
- Course: Snack, dessert
- Place of origin: Guangdong, China
- Region or state: Cantonese-speaking areas
- Main ingredients: Winter melon, almond paste, sesame, five spice powder

Sweetheart cake
- Traditional Chinese: 老婆餅
- Simplified Chinese: 老婆饼
- Literal meaning: wife ("sweetheart") cake
Transcriptions
Standard Mandarin
- Hanyu Pinyin: lǎopó bǐng
Yue: Cantonese
- Jyutping: lou5 po4 beng2
- IPA: [lo̬u pʰɔ̏ː pɛ̌ːŋ]
Southern Min
- Hokkien POJ: lāu-pô-piáⁿ

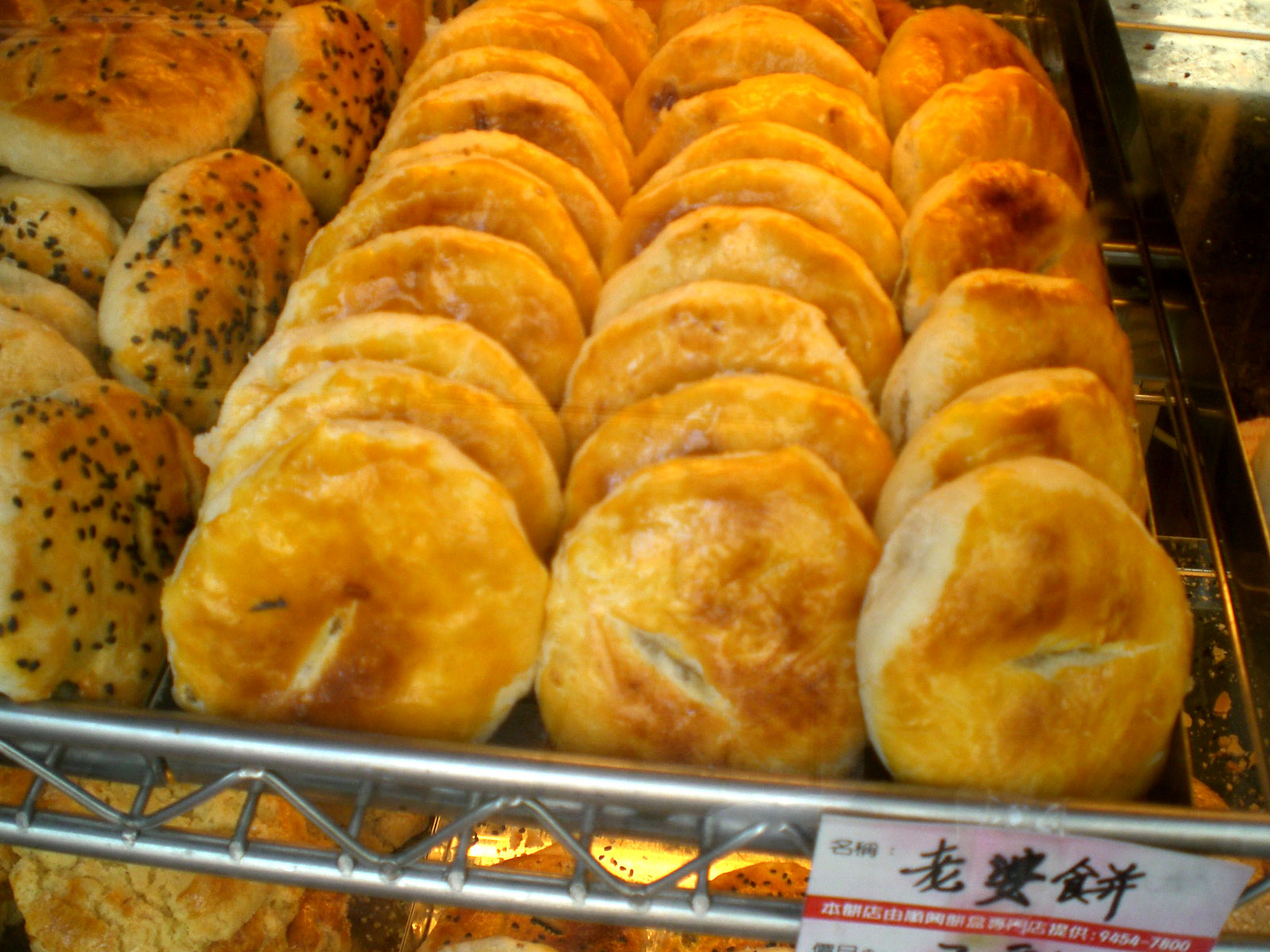
Wife cake

A sweetheart cake or wife cake or marriage pie is a traditional Chinese cake with a thin crust of Chinese flaky pastry, made with a filling of winter melon, almond paste, and sesame, and spiced with five spice powder. "Wife cake" is the translation of 老婆饼 from Chinese, and although the meaning is "wife", the literal translation is "old lady cake", paralleling the colloquial usage of "old lady" for "wife" in English. In Hong Kong, it is known as a specialty of the Yuen Long District.

== Variants ==
The traditional variant is from Guangdong province, where the filling consists of candied wintermelon. The candied wintermelon mash is then combined with white sesame seeds and glutinous rice flour. Coconut in the form of mash or desiccated shreds and almond paste, as well as vanilla, are also sometimes added. The paste is encased in Cantonese-style pastry dough; the authentic flavour and flaky texture of the pastry is traditionally produced by using pork lard shortening, and glazing with egg wash. Due to its rising popularity in Western countries, brought about by immigration, butter is sometimes substituted in place of lard, though this will alter the taste. The level of sweetness is mild, compared to Western sweet pastries.

Southeast Asian variations can include spices such as Chinese five spice (五香粉). Although this spice is of Chinese origin, it was not traditionally used in sweetheart cakes. Sweetheart cake may be confused with the husband cake (老公饼 or Lao gong bing), which uses red bean curd and star anise in its filling.

== Legends of origin ==
There are many legends that attempt to explain the origins of the sweetheart cake. One tells the tale of a couple that lived a very poor life in imperial China. They loved each other and lived in a small village. Suddenly, a mysterious disease spread and the husband's father became very sick. The couple spent all of their money in order to treat the man's father. The wife sold herself as a slave in exchange for money to buy medicine for her father-in-law. Once the husband learned about what his wife did, he made a cake filled with sweetened wintermelon and almond. He dedicated this pastry to his wife whom he could never forget, and sold it on the street. His cake became so popular that he was able to earn enough money to buy his wife back.

There is another version where the man went searching for his wife after he earned enough money to buy her back. In his search, he had a cup of tea at a local teahouse, when he suddenly recognised the pastry they were serving with the tea. The man and his wife were reunited at the teahouse.

Another story tells of a dim sum chef's wife creating a pastry with wintermelon paste influenced by a recipe from her mother's family. The new pastry was found to taste better than the dim sums that were being sold in teahouses, and the chef proudly told everyone it was made by his wife, hence it was named "Wife Cake".

== See also ==
- Chinese bakery products
- List of Chinese desserts
- List of desserts
- List of melon dishes
- List of pastries
- Marry girl cake
