= Dowry cake =

Chinese cake once used as a wedding gift

Marry girl cake
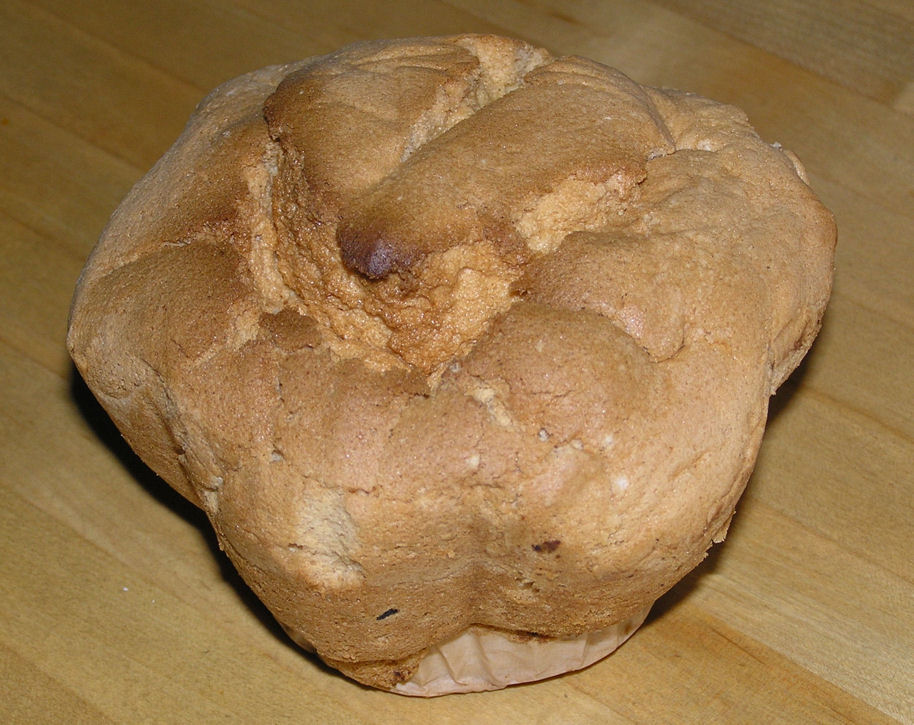
- Type: Sponge cake
- Place of origin: China

Dowry cake
- Traditional Chinese: 嫁女餅
- Simplified Chinese: 嫁女饼
- Literal meaning: dowry girl cake
Transcriptions
Standard Mandarin
- Hanyu Pinyin: jià nǚ bǐng
Yue: Cantonese
- Jyutping: gaa3 neoi5 bang3

Marry girl cake or dowry cake is a traditional Chinese cake that was once a ceremonial cake used as a wedding gift in the traditional Chinese wedding ceremony, hence the name. Today, this cake is known more as a classic Chinese pastry rather than a wedding gift because it has lost most of its original significance due to cultural change. It can be found in Hong Kong and in some Chinatowns overseas.

== Production ==
The cake is essentially a lightly sweetened sponge cake that may take any number of shapes or appearances. It is considered large compared to the size of most pastries. The internal base of the cake may consist of lotus seed paste.

== History ==
The importance of giving out marry girl cakes is illustrated by an anecdote dating from the era of the Three Kingdoms. At that time, Liu Bei had borrowed a place called Jingzhou for a long period of time and seemed in no hurry to return it to its owner, Sun Quan. Thus, Sun Quan's advisor, Zhou Yu, suggested a "honey trap". Sun Quan pretended that he was offering Liu Bei his recently widowed sister as a wife. Liu Bei had to leave Jingzhou for Suzhou to attend the ceremony. He knew it was a trick, however, after arriving in Suzhou, he told his soldiers to deliver cakes to Sun Quan. This move forced Sun Quan to accept the alliance as sealed. Since then, the Chinese follow the custom of sending marry girl cakes to share their happiness with family and friends.

== See also ==
- Marriage in China
- Moon cake
- Chinese tradition
- Sweetheart cake
