= Cocktail bun =

Sweet bun with coconut

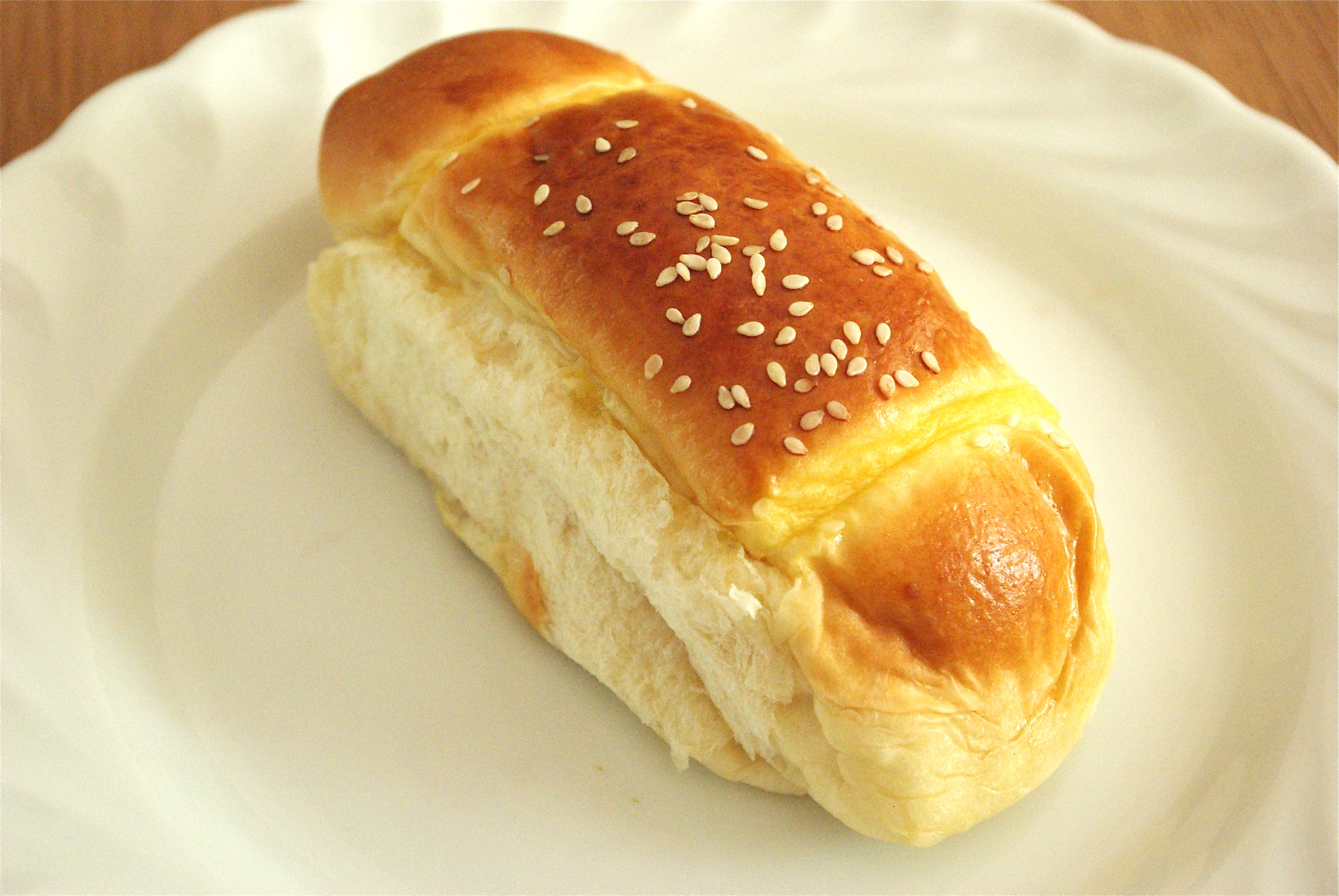
- Type: Sweet bun
- Place of origin: Hong Kong
- Main ingredients: Coconut, butter or margarine

Cocktail bun
- Traditional Chinese: 雞尾包
- Simplified Chinese: 鸡尾包
- Jyutping: gai1 mei5 baau1
- Literal meaning: cock (chicken) tail bun
Transcriptions
Standard Mandarin
- Hanyu Pinyin: jīwěi bāo
Yue: Cantonese
- Yale Romanization: gāi méih bāau
- Jyutping: gai1 mei5 baau1

The cocktail bun (Chinese: 雞尾包; Jyutping: gai^{1} mei^{5} baau^{1}) is a Hong Kong–style sweet bun with a filling of shredded coconut.

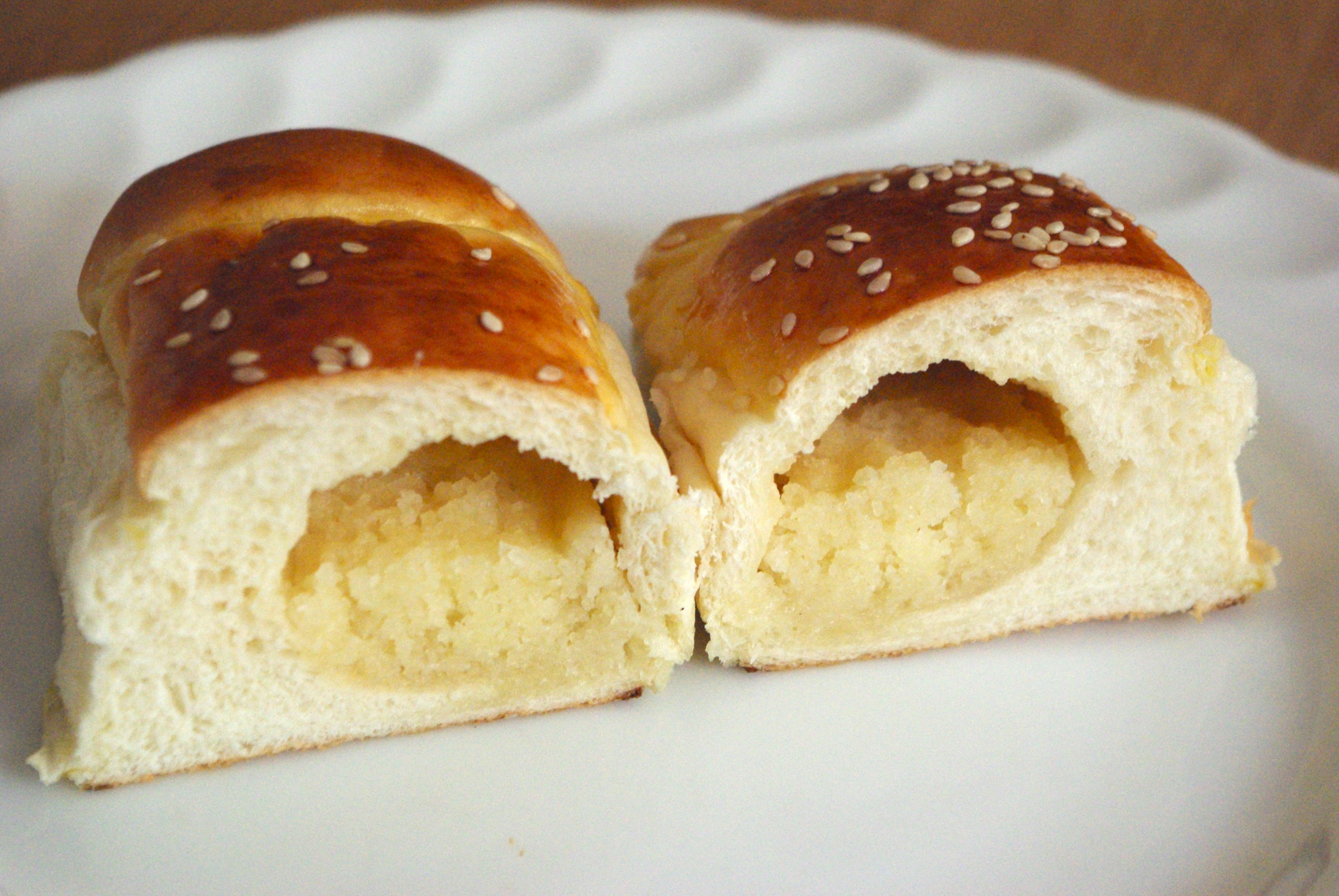
Cocktail bun cross-section, revealing the coconut filling.

== History ==
The cocktail bun is said to have been created in the 1950s in Hong Kong, when the proprietors of a bakery resisted disposing unsold but edible buns by incorporating them into a new product. The day-old buns were ground up, with sugar and coconut added in, to create a filling mixture; fresh bread dough was wrapped around this mixture to make the first filled "cocktail bun".

Its name is said to have come from comparing the baker's mixture of hodgepodge of ingredients to a bartender's exotic mixture of alcoholic liquors, both formulating a "cocktail". The Chinese name is a literal translation of "cocktail", and is called a "chicken-tail bun".

In Hong Kong, the cocktail bun is regarded as a familiar part of the Hong Kong identity, and is particularly associated with the 1980s.

== Production ==
Originally, the filling was made of blending day-old buns with granulated sugar. Newer versions saw the addition of shredded coconut and butter or margarine to the recipe, which are now key ingredients in the filling. Each bun is approximately 6 to 8 inches long and 2 to 3 inches high in the shape of a small baguette. The cocktail bun can be found in many Chinese bakeries along with other sweet buns like the pineapple bun, which also originated from Hong Kong.

== Texture ==
The bun itself is soft, pliable and lightly sweet, typical of Hong Kong-style breads. The coconut-based filling is dense and has a rich, buttery and sweet flavour. A final egg wash to the exterior lends a shiny, golden-brown color to the tops, which are further decorated with stripes or other simple designs using some of the buttery coconut filling, and often finished with a sprinkling of sesame seeds.

The Taiwanese version of the cocktail bun is slightly firmer than its Hong Kong counterpart, but still maintains the same filling and sesame seed dusting.

== See also ==
- List of buns
- List of stuffed dishes
