= Flaky pastry =

Form of unleavened pastry

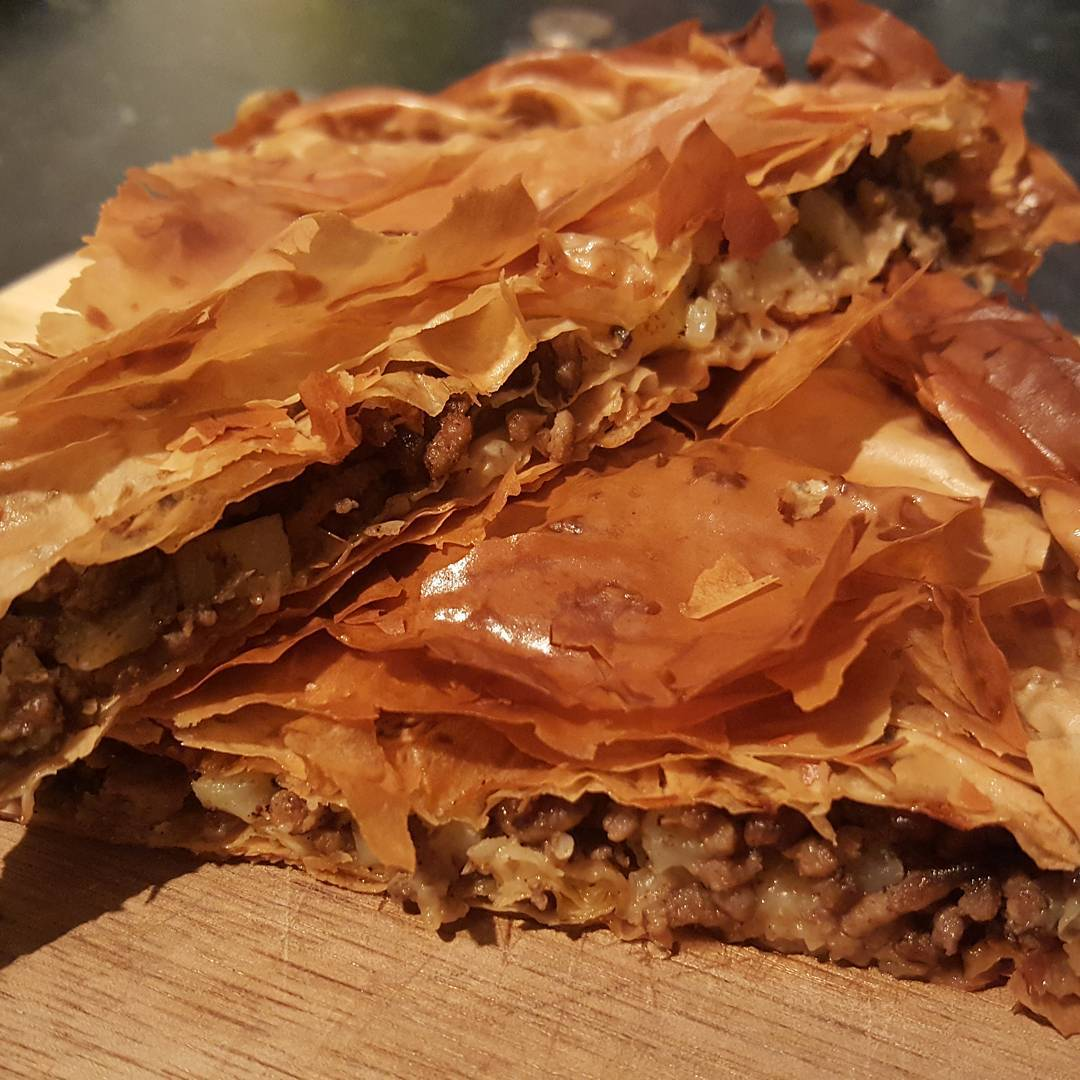
- Meat pie with flaky pastry
- Alternative names: Quick puff pastry, blitz puff pastry
- Type: Pastry
- Main ingredients: Flour, butter
- Similar dishes: Chinese flaky pastry

Flaky pastry, also known as quick pastry, blitz pastry, or rough puff, is a light and thin unleavened pastry that is similar to, but distinct from, puff pastry. It is often called quick pastry or blitz pastry in reference to the short time its preparation requires.

Flaky pastry relies on large lumps of butter (approximately 1 in or 2.5 cm across) mixed into the dough, as opposed to the large rectangle of butter in puff pastry. Flaky pastry dough is then rolled and folded in a manner similar to puff pastry.

The chunks of shortening keep the rolled particles of dough in the flaky pastry separate from each other, so that when the dough is baked they become flakes. This yields a different texture from puff pastry, where rectangles of dough and fat are rolled and folded together in such a way that the result is a number of uniform sheets of pastry.

Flaky pastry is used to make pasties, turnovers, sausage rolls, and plaits. It may be used to make dishes, such as samosas and curry puffs, that traditionally are made with other types of pastry dough.

Chinese flaky pastry uses lard instead of butter to create the flaky texture.

== See also ==
- List of pastries
- Phyllo
- Puff pastry
- Types of pastry
