= Black sesame rice cake =

Chinese traditional cake

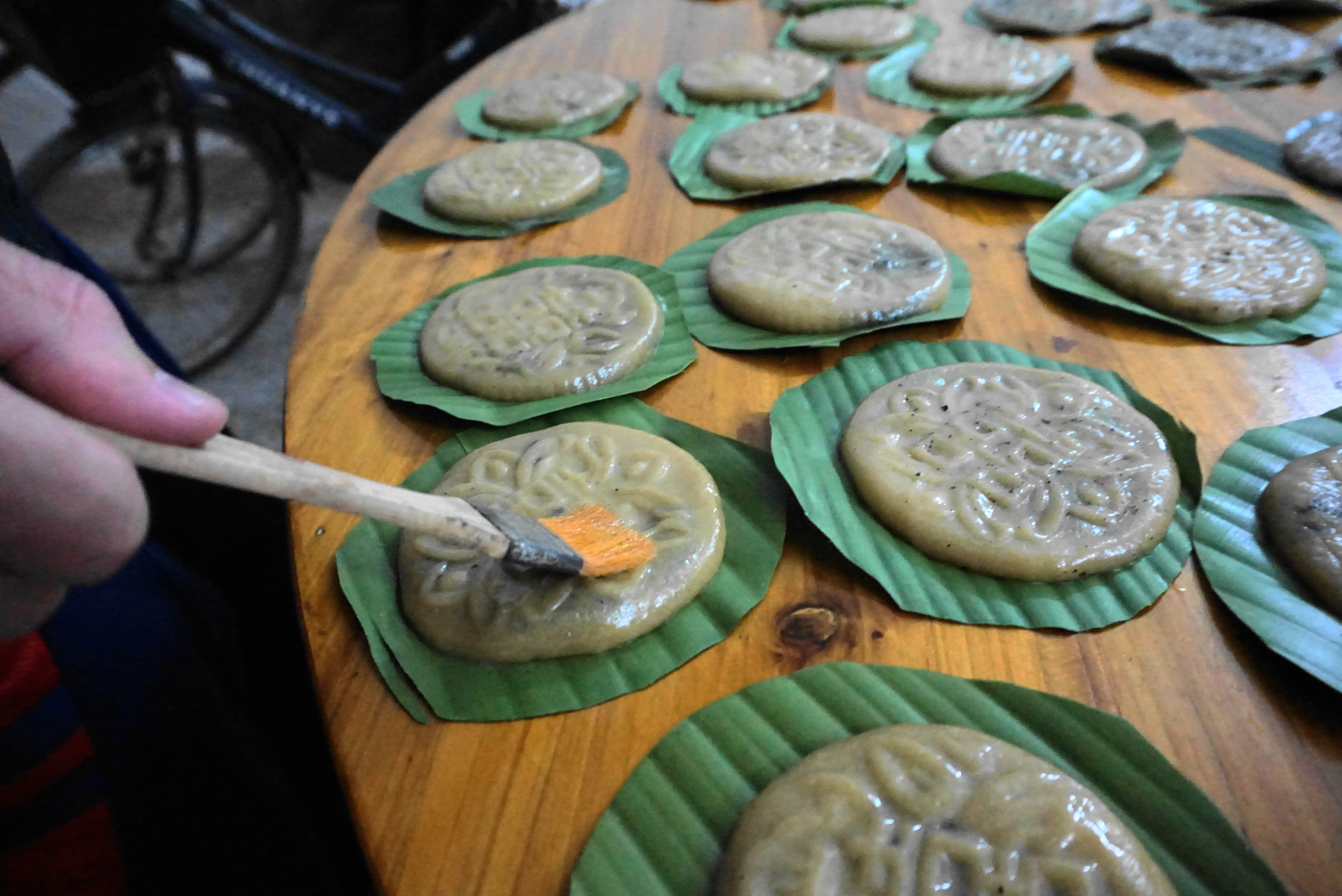
- Imprinted Black Sesame Rice Cake - Making (11)
- Course: Dessert
- Place of origin: China
- Region or state: south
- Main ingredients: glutinous rice, sesame

Black sesame rice cake is a Chinese traditional cake made with glutinous rice and sesame.
