= Pastry =

An unleavened dough

Pastries
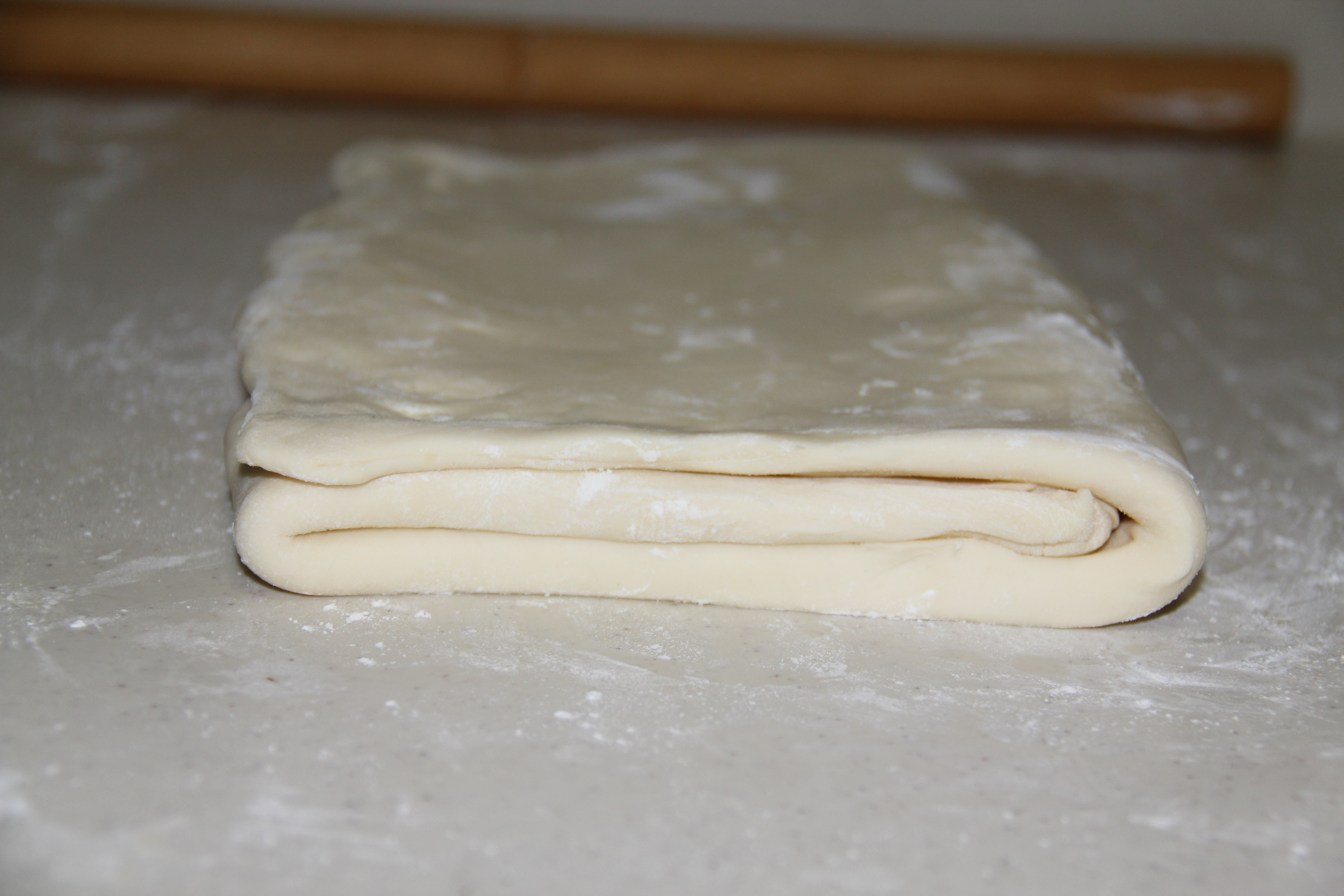
- The folding process of a puff pastry
- Place of origin: Worldwide
- Main ingredients: Often flour, sugar, milk, butter, lard or shortening, baking powder, eggs

Pastry is various unleavened doughs, often enriched with fat or eggs. The dough may be called pastry dough. Common pastry dishes include börek, pies, tarts, and turnovers.

In North America, the term pastry is used for sweet baked goods made with dough. However, it is generally used colloquially to describe all sweet baked or fried goods. This usage is a modern term, as historically, as per The American Heritage Dictionary, the term was similar to that used in British and Australian English.

Items like croissant and Danish pastry may look like puff pastry (one of the types of pastry dough) but are made with a leavened dough, called Viennoiserie, and are described by some as a meeting point between bread and pastry, or, as by the Dictionnaire Petit Robert, as neither a pastry nor a bread.

== Definitions and terms ==
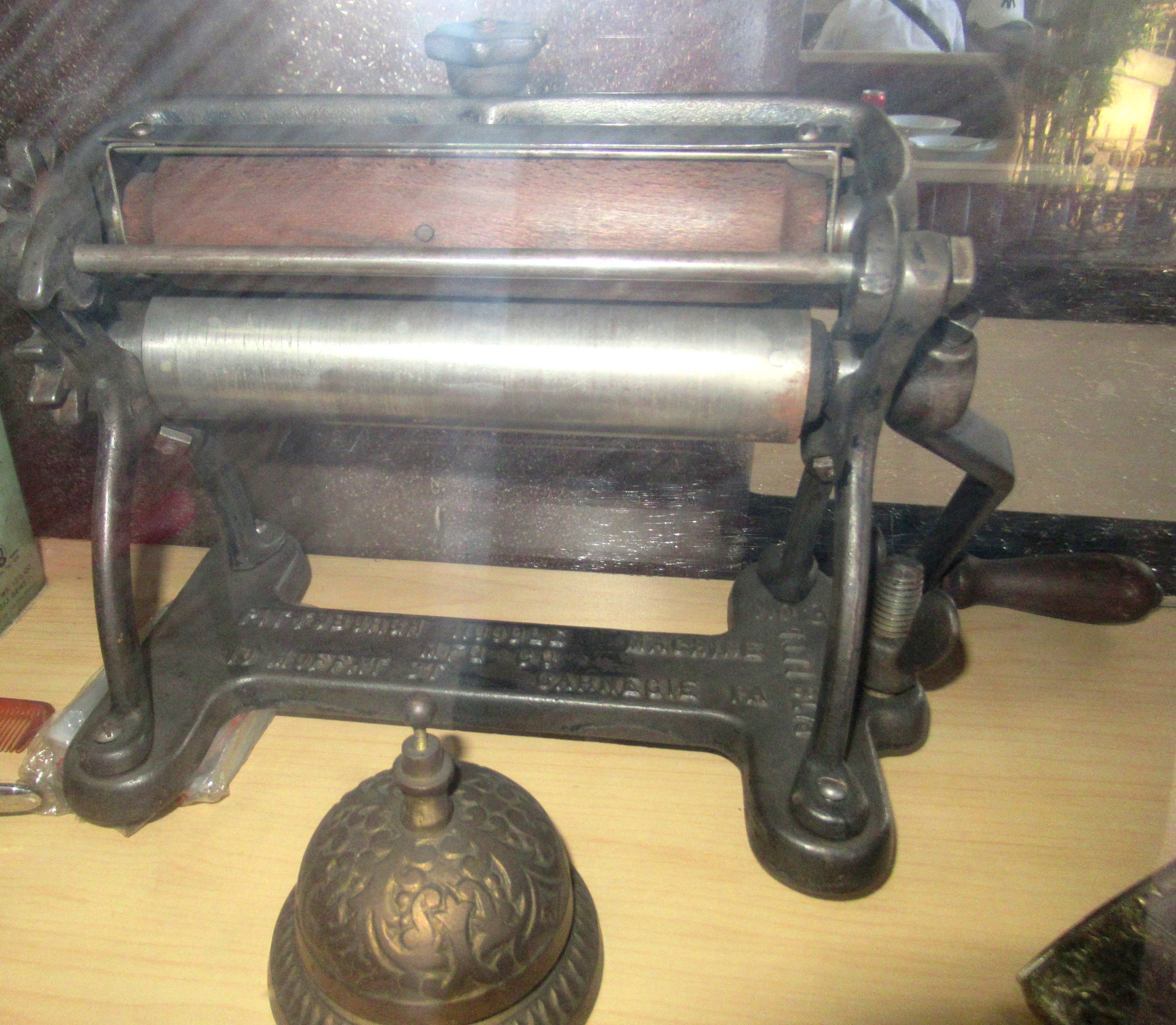
Pastry brake, dough brake or pasta maker for filo dough

The precise definition of the term pastry varies based on location and culture. Common doughs used to make pastries include filo dough, puff pastry, choux pastry, shortcrust pastry, and flaky pastry. Pastry tends to have a delicate texture, often flaky or crumbly, and rich flavor. This is caused by the crystals found in solid fats, which forces the starch particles apart and stops the formation of elastic gluten, making the pastry short. Products made with pastry tend to be baked.

=== Pastry terms ===
Pastry blender
A kitchen implement used to chop the fat into the flour, which prevents the melting of the fat with body heat from fingers, and improves control of the size of the fat chunks. Usually constructed of wire or plastic, with multiple wires or small blades connected to a handle.
Pastry board
A square or oblong board, preferably marble but usually wood, on which pastry is flattened.
Pastry brake/Dough sheeter
Opposed and counter-rotating rollers with a variable gap through which pastry can be worked and reduced in thickness for commercial production. A small version is used domestically for pasta production.
Pastry case
An uncooked or blind baked pastry container that is used to hold savory or sweet mixtures.
Pastry cutters
Various metal or plastic outlines of shapes, e.g. circles, fluted circles, diamonds, gingerbread men, etc., sharpened on one or both sides and used to cut out corresponding shapes from biscuit, scone, pastry, or cake mixtures.
Blind-baking
The process of baking a pie or tart crust before adding its filling, necessary because it prevents soggy bottoms and aligns baking times. these provide a crisp pastry and sealed moisture barrier. on top of that it is used when fillings require little to no oven time. This is also called pre-baking.

== History ==
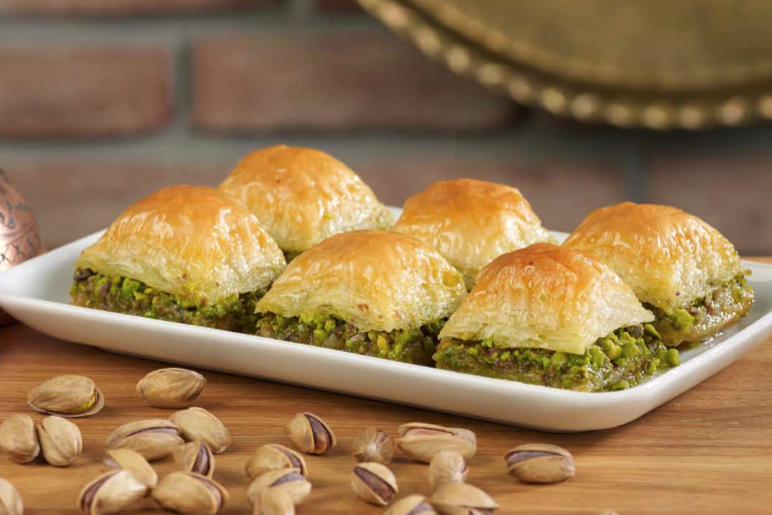
A typical Mediterranean baklava, a phyllo dough pastry sweetened with nuts and honey

The European tradition of pastry-making is often traced back to the shortcrust era of flaky doughs that were in use throughout the Mediterranean in ancient times. In the ancient Mediterranean, the Romans, Greeks, and Phoenicians all had filo-style pastry in their culinary traditions. In the plays of Aristophanes, written in the 5th century BC, there is mention of sweetmeats, including small baked goods filled with fruit. Roman cuisine used flour, oil, and water to make the pastry dough that were used to cover meats and fowls during baking in order to keep in the juices, but the pastry was not meant to be eaten. A pastry that was meant to be eaten was a richer pastry that was made into small baked goods containing eggs or little birds and that were often served at banquets. Greeks and Romans both struggled in making a good pastry because they used oil in the cooking process, and oil causes the pastry to lose its stiffness.

In the medieval cuisine of Northern Europe, chefs were able to produce nice, stiff pastry dough because they cooked with shortening and butter. Some incomplete lists of ingredients have been found in medieval cookbooks, but no full, detailed versions. There were stiff, empty pastry dough called coffins or 'huff paste', that were eaten by servants only and included an egg yolk glaze to help make them more enjoyable to consume. Medieval pastry based baked goods also included small tarts to add richness.

It was not until about the mid-16th century that actual pastry recipes began appearing. These recipes were adopted and adapted over time in various European countries, resulting in the myriad pastry traditions known to the region, including Portuguese "pastéis de nata" to Pasty in the United Kingdom.

Throughout the world pastry has developed. In China, Chinese flaky pastry (Chinese: 中式酥皮; also known as Chinese puff pastry) is made in two distinct styles, Huaiyang-style (淮揚酥皮) and Cantonese-style pastry (廣式酥皮). In Asia, spring rolls are made with a simple pastry dough of water, flour and oil.

== Types of pastry dough ==
Shortcrust pastry
Shortcrust pastry is the simplest and most common pastry. It is made with flour, fat, butter, salt, and water to bind the dough. Pâte brisée is the French version of classic pie or tart shortcrust pastry. The process of making pastry includes mixing of the fat and flour, adding water, chilling and then rolling out the dough. Chilling before rolling is essential since it enables the fat (lard, butter, etc.) to harden again and thus create flaky layers in the dough. It also allows for even hydration and inhibits gluten formation. It results in a tender flaky pastry. The fat is mixed with the flour first, generally by rubbing with fingers or a pastry blender, which inhibits gluten formation by coating the gluten strands in fat and results in a short (as in crumbly; hence the term shortcrust), tender pastry. A related type is the sweetened sweetcrust pastry, also known as pâte sucrée, in which sugar and egg yolks have been added (rather than water) to bind the pastry.
Puff pastry
Puff pastry has many layers that cause it to expand or "puff" when baked. Puff pastry is made using a laminated dough consisting of flour, butter, salt, and water. The pastry rises up due to the water and fats expanding as they turn into steam upon heating. Puff pastry come out of the oven light, flaky, and tender.
Flaky pastry
Flaky pastry is a simple pastry that expands when cooked due to the number of layers. It bakes into a crisp, buttery pastry. The "puff" is obtained by the shard-like layers of fat, most often butter or shortening, creating layers which expand in the heat of the oven when baked. A form of Flaky pastry is Chinese flaky pastry, but it uses oil instead of butter.
Choux pastry
Choux pastry is a very light pastry that is often filled with cream. Unlike other types of pastry, choux is in fact closer to a dough before being cooked which gives it the ability to be piped into various shapes such as the éclair and profiterole. Its name originates from the French choux, meaning cabbage, owing to its rough cabbage-like shape after cooking.
Choux begins as a mixture of milk or water and butter which are heated together until the butter melts, to which flour is added to form a dough. Eggs are then beaten into the dough to further enrich it. This high percentage of water causes the pastry to expand into a light, hollow pastry. Initially, the water in the dough turns to steam in the oven and causes the pastry to rise; then the starch in the flour gelatinizes, thereby solidifying the pastry. Once the choux dough has expanded, it is taken out of the oven; a hole is made in it to let out the steam. The pastry is then placed back in the oven to dry out and become crisp. The pastry is filled with various flavors of cream and is often topped with chocolate. Choux pastries can also be filled with ingredients such as cheese, tuna, or chicken to be used as appetizers.
Filo (Phyllo)
FIlo is a paper-thin pastry dough that is used in many layers. The filo is generally wrapped around a filling and brushed with butter before baking. These pastries are very delicate and flaky.
Malsouka
Also known as brik sheets, (Arabic: ورق البريك, French: feuilles de brick) or bourek sheets (ورق البوراك) or dioul (Arabic: ديول) is a Maghrebi pastry sheet that resembles filo. It is thicker than filo and unlike filo is created by spreading wafer-thin layers of dough on a heated pan rather than by rolling a raw dough.
Hot water crust pastry
Hot water crust pastry is used for savoury pies, such as pork pies, game pies, and, more rarely, steak and kidney pies. Hot water crust is traditionally used for making hand-raised pies. The usual ingredients are hot water, lard, and flour. The pastry is made by heating water into which the fat is then melted, before bringing to the boil, and finally mixing with the flour. It can be done by beating the flour into the mixture in the pan, or by kneading on a pastry board. Either way, the result is a hot and rather sticky paste that can be used for hand-raising: shaping by hand, sometimes using a dish or bowl as an inner mould. As the crust cools, its shape is largely retained, and it is filled and covered with a crust, ready for baking. Hand-raised hot water crust pastry does not produce a neat and uniform finish, as there will be sagging during the cooking of the filled pie, which is generally accepted as the mark of a hand-made pie.
Suet pastry
A traditional pastry in British cuisine used in both sweet and savoury dishes. Suet is the raw, hard fat of beef, lamb, or mutton found around the loins and kidneys. Its high smoke point makes it ideal for deep frying and pastry production.
Strudelteig pastry
Traditional strudel pastry, known as Strudelteig, differs from puff pastry in that it is very elastic. It is made from flour with a high gluten content, water, oil, and salt, with no sugar added. The dough is worked vigorously, rested, and then rolled out and stretched by hand very thinly with the help of a clean linen tea towel or kitchen paper.

== Chemistry ==
Different kinds of pastry doughs are made by utilizing the natural characteristics of wheat flour and certain fats. When wheat flour is mixed with water and kneaded into plain dough, it develops strands of gluten, which are what make bread tough and elastic. In a typical pastry, however, this toughness is unwanted, so fat or oil is added to slow down the development of gluten. Pastry flour can also be used, since it typically has a lower level of protein than all-purpose or bread flours.

Lard or suet work well because they have a coarse, crystalline structure that is very effective. Using unclarified butter does not work well because of its water content; clarified butter, or ghee, which is virtually water-free, is better, but shortcrust pastry using only butter may develop an inferior texture. If the fat is melted with hot water or if liquid oil is used, the thin oily layer between the grains offers less of an obstacle to gluten formation and the resulting pastry is tougher.

A good pastry is light and airy and fatty, but firm enough to support the weight of the filling. When making a shortcrust pastry, care must be taken to blend the fat and flour thoroughly before adding any liquid. This is to ensure that the flour granules are adequately coated with fat and less likely to develop gluten. On the other hand, overmixing results in long gluten strands that toughen the pastry.

== Gallery ==
Items made with pastry dough.

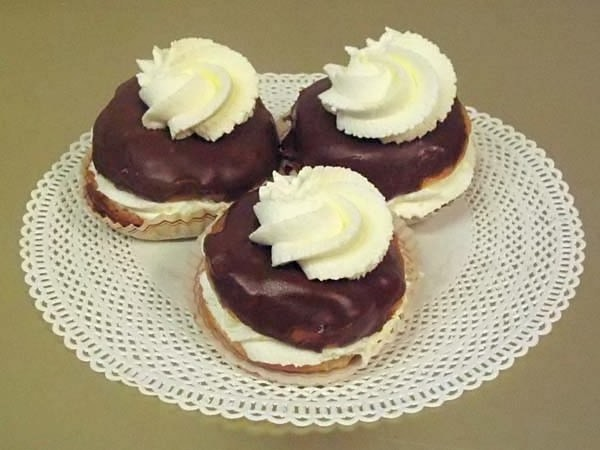
Dutch Moorkoppen, a type of Profiterole

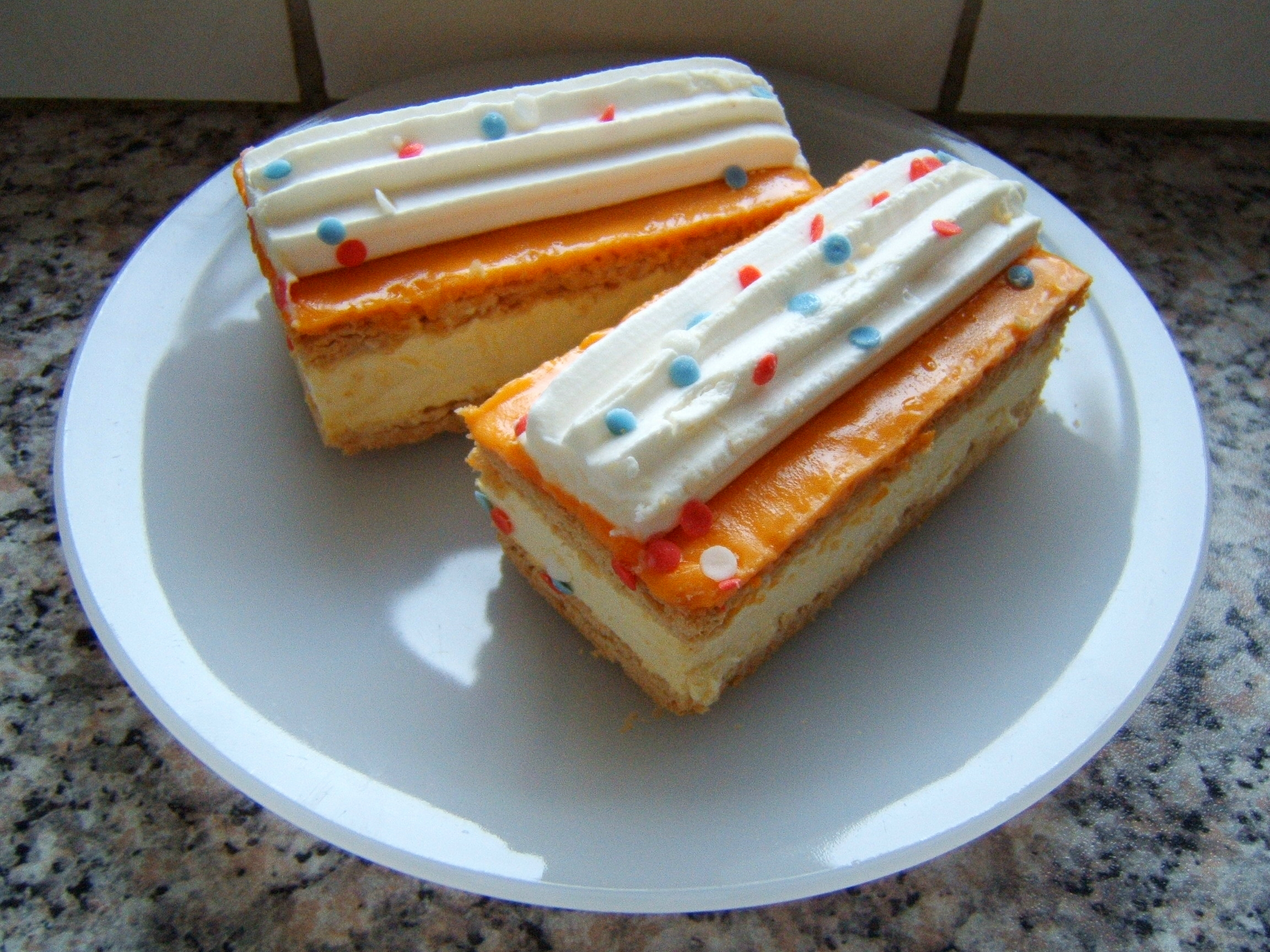
Tompouce, a Dutch and Belgian cream slice or Mille-feuille

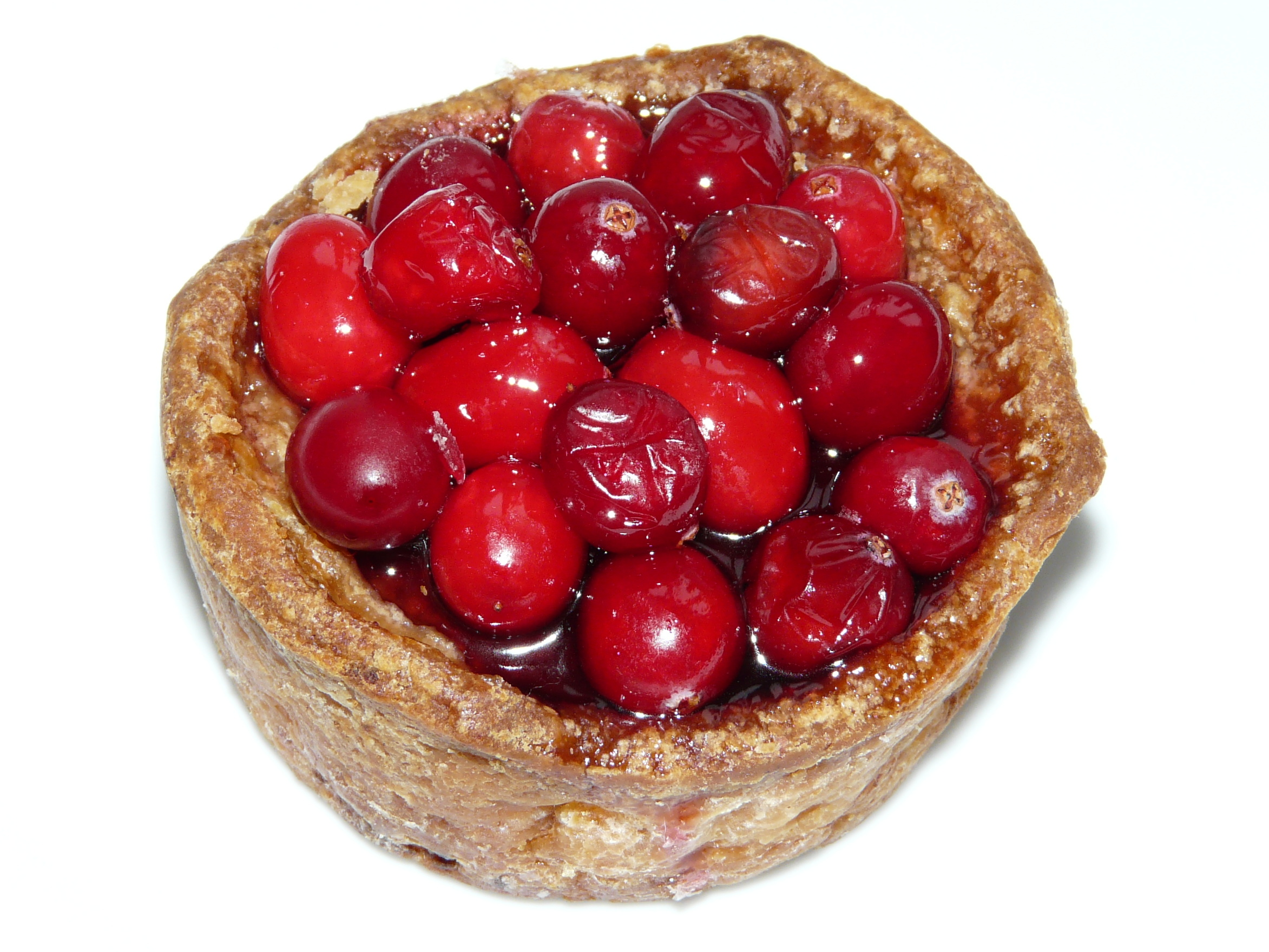
English pork pie topped with red currants

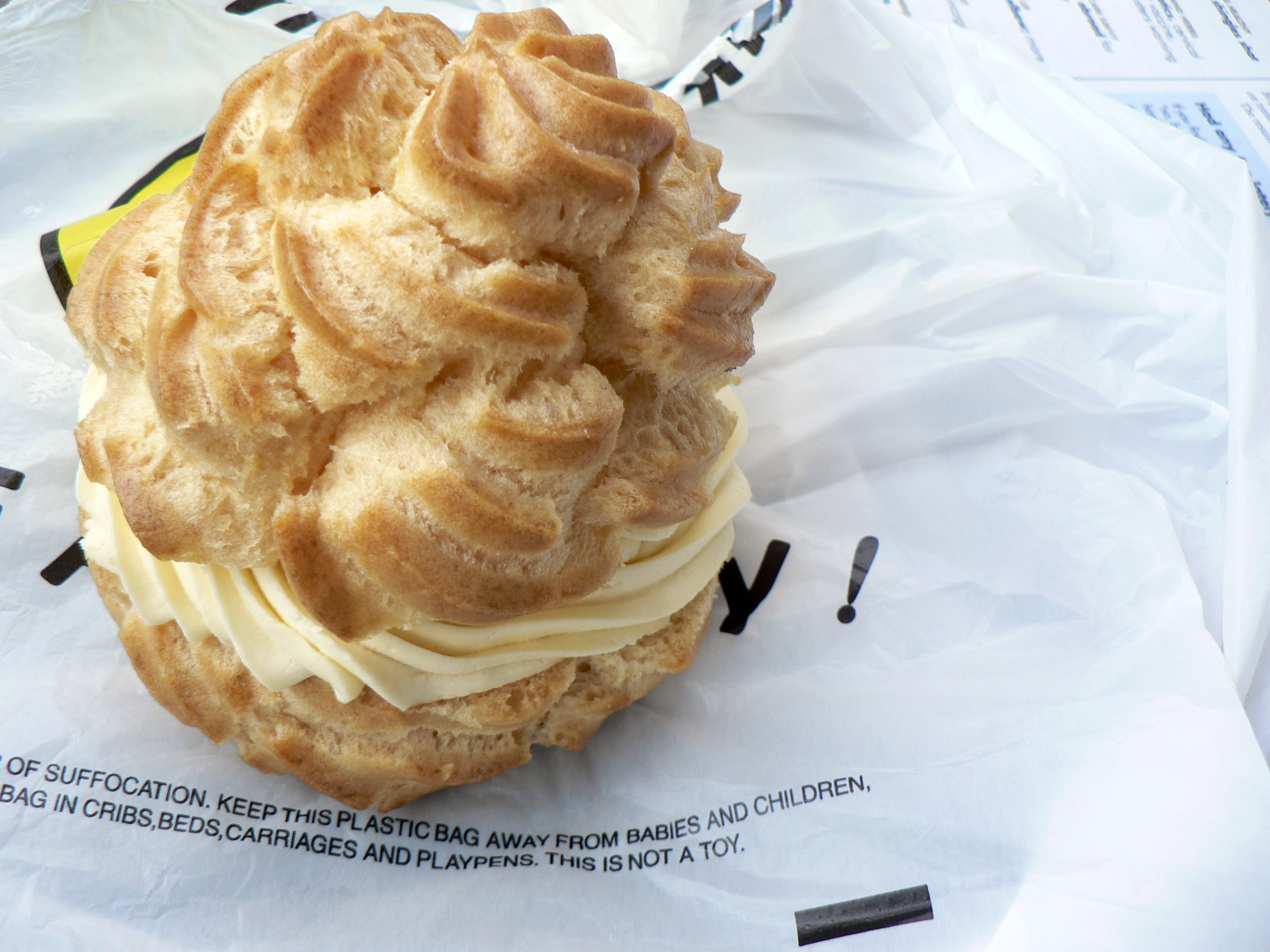
Profiterole or cream puff, a choux pastry

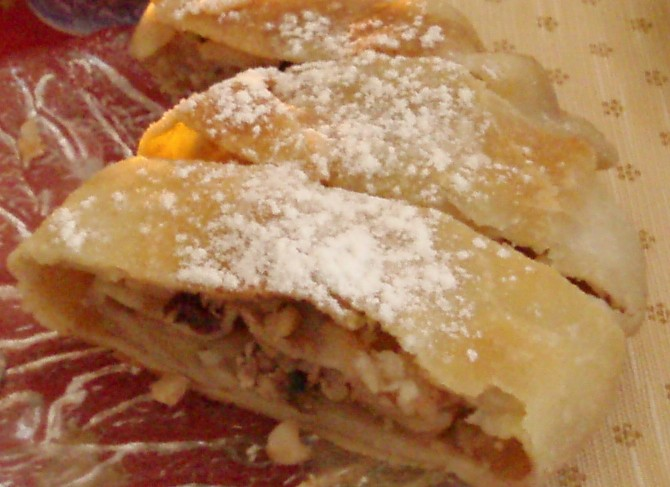
Strudel, a dessert made from hand-stretched leaf dough

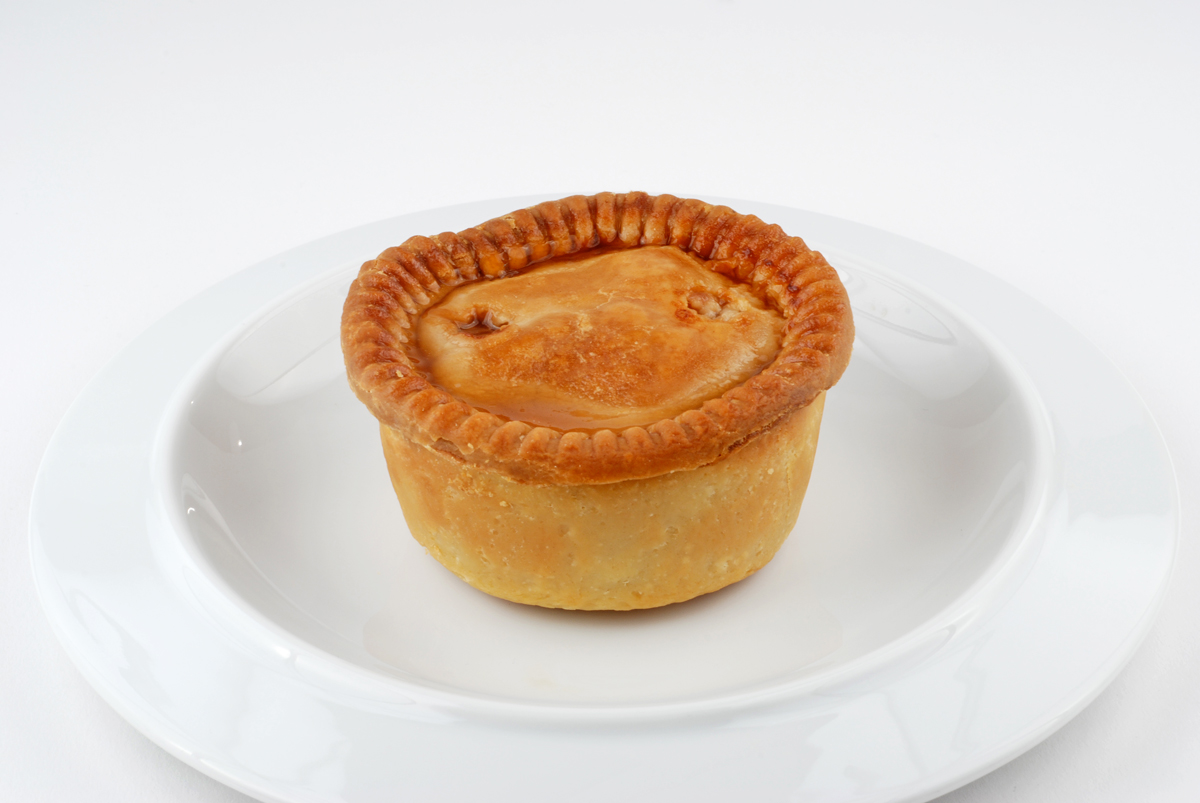
Pork pie

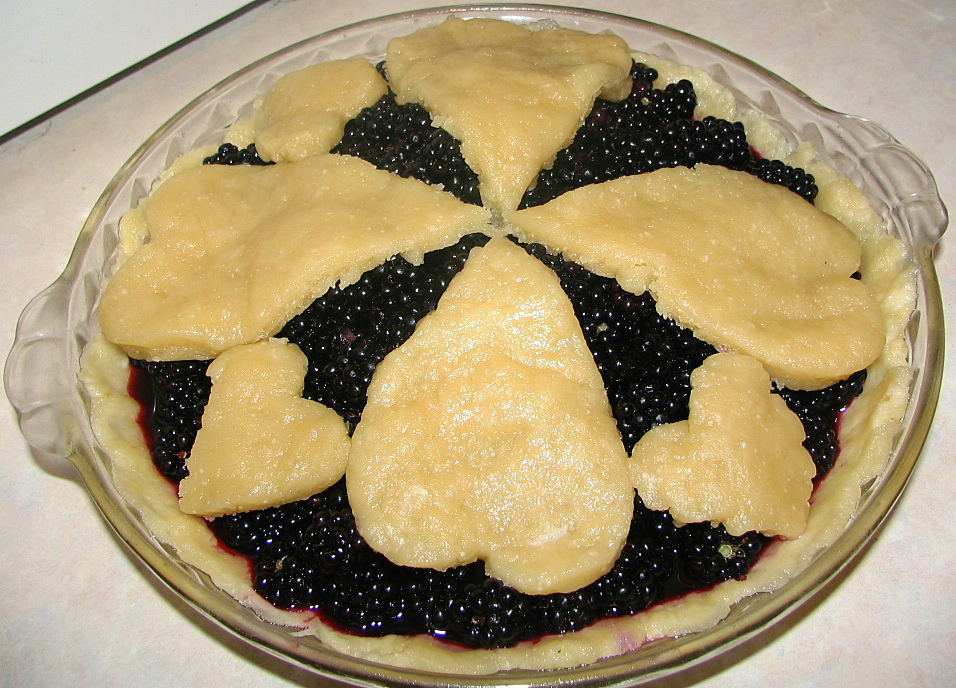
Blackberry pie made with a pastry crust

== See also ==
- Jesuite
- List of food preparation utensils
- Mold (cooking implement)
- Pastry brush
- Pastry fork
- Pie crust
