= Puff pastry =

Light, flaky pastry

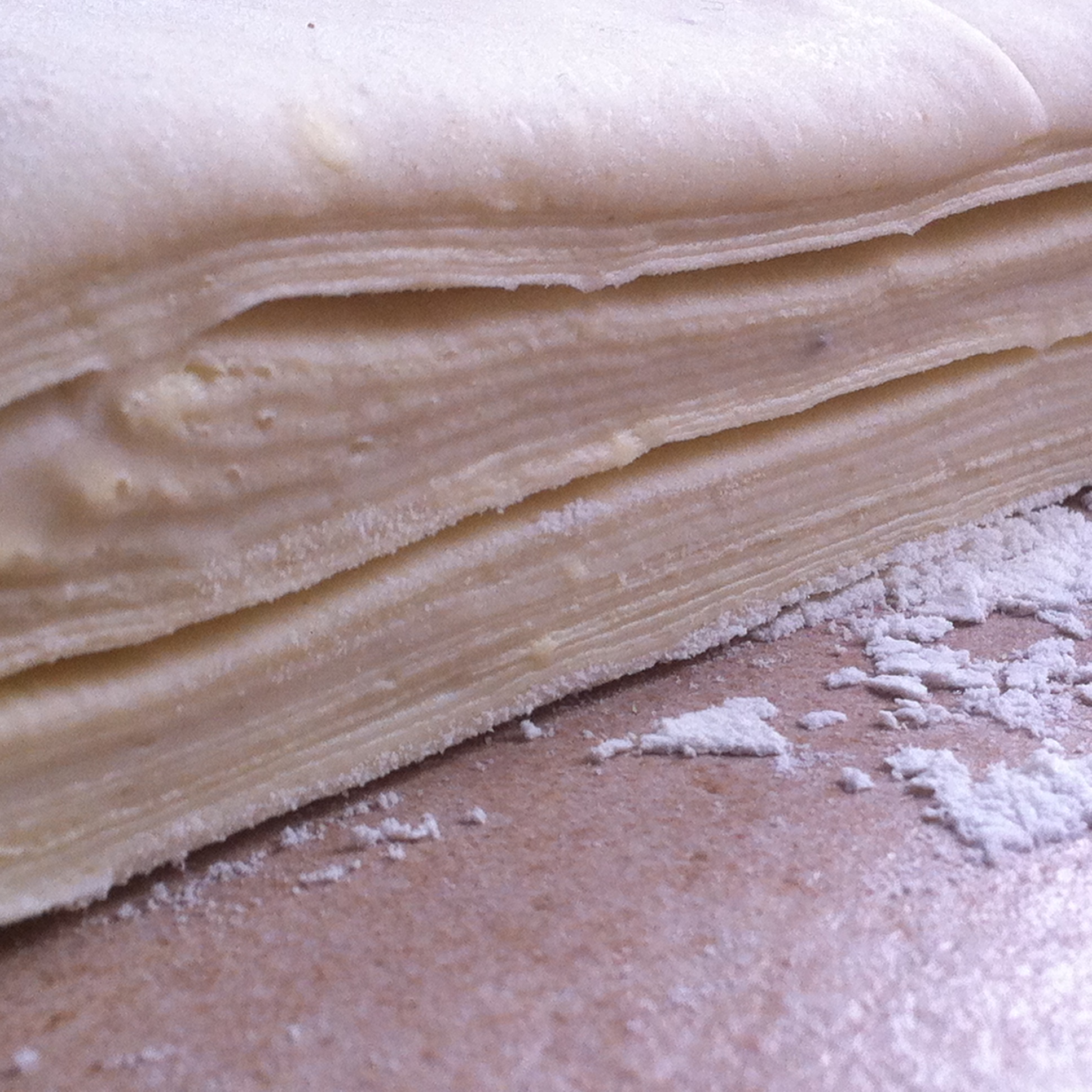
- Puff pastry before baking, with layers clearly visible
- Alternative names: pâte feuilletée
- Type: Pastry
- Main ingredients: Butter or other solid culinary fat, flour, water

Puff pastry, also known as pâte feuilletée, is a light, flaky pastry, its base dough (détrempe) composed of wheat flour and water. Butter or other solid fat (beurrage) is then layered into the dough. The dough is repeatedly rolled and folded, rested, re-rolled and folded, encasing solid butter between each resulting layer.

This produces a laminated dough. During baking, gaps form between the layers left by the fat melting; the pastry is leavened by steam from the water content of the fat as it expands, puffing the separate layers. The pastry layers crisp as the heated fat is in contact with its surfaces.

== History ==
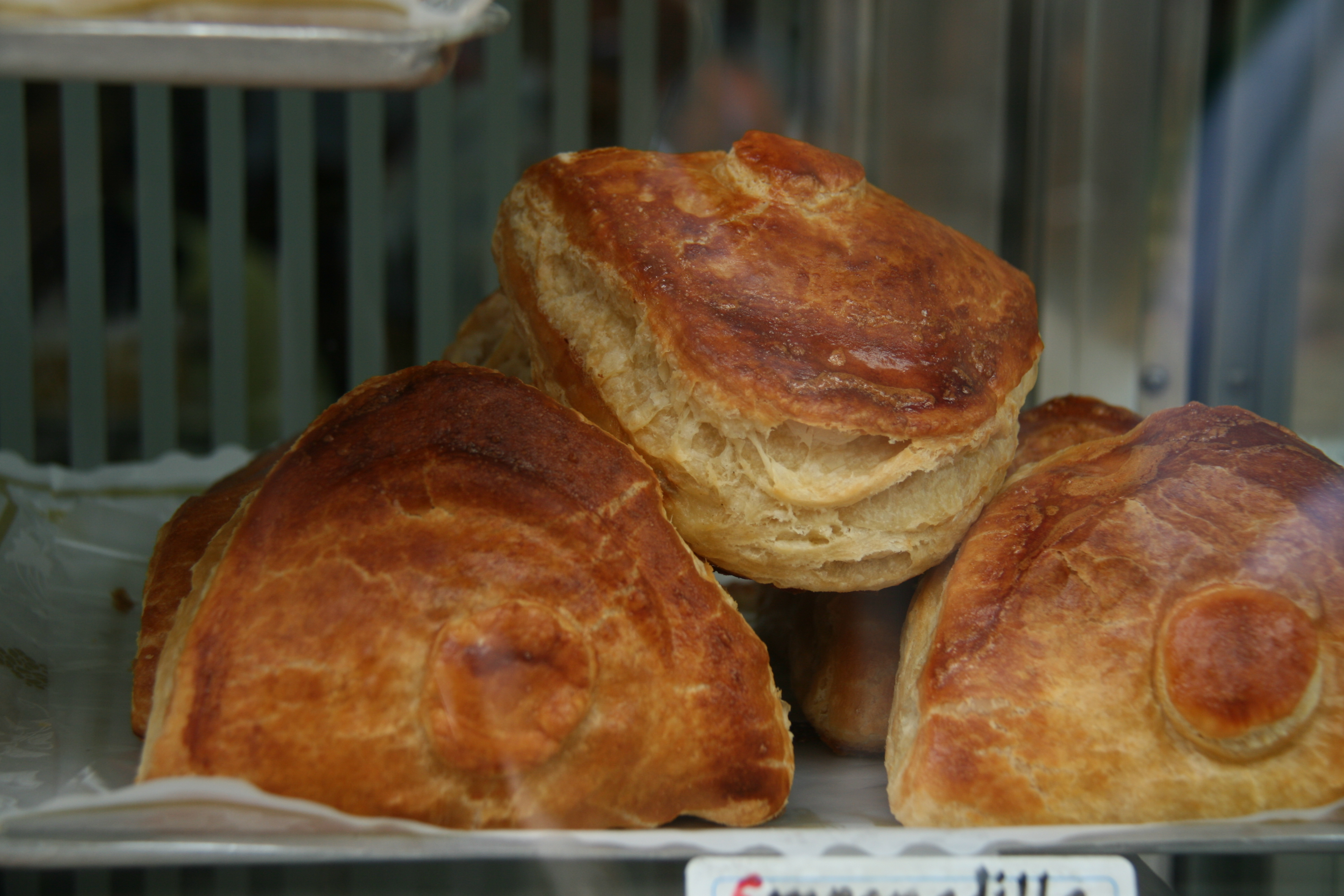
Spanish pastry in Madrid

While modern puff pastry was developed in France in the 17th century, related laminated and air-leavened pastry has a long history. In Spain, likely built upon Arab or Moorish culinary traditions, the first known recipe for pastry using butter or lard following the Arab technique of making each layer separately, appears in the Spanish recipe book Libro del arte de cozina ('book on the art of cooking') by Domingo Hernández de Maceras, published in 1607. Hernández, the head cook of a college of the University of Salamanca, already distinguished between filled puff pastry recipes and puff pastry tarts, and even mentions leavened preparations. Francisco Martínez Motiño, head chef to Philip II of Spain (1527–1598), also gave several recipes of puff pastry in his Arte de cocina, pastelería, bizcochería y conservería published in 1611. In this book, puff pastry is abundantly used, particularly to make savoury game pies.

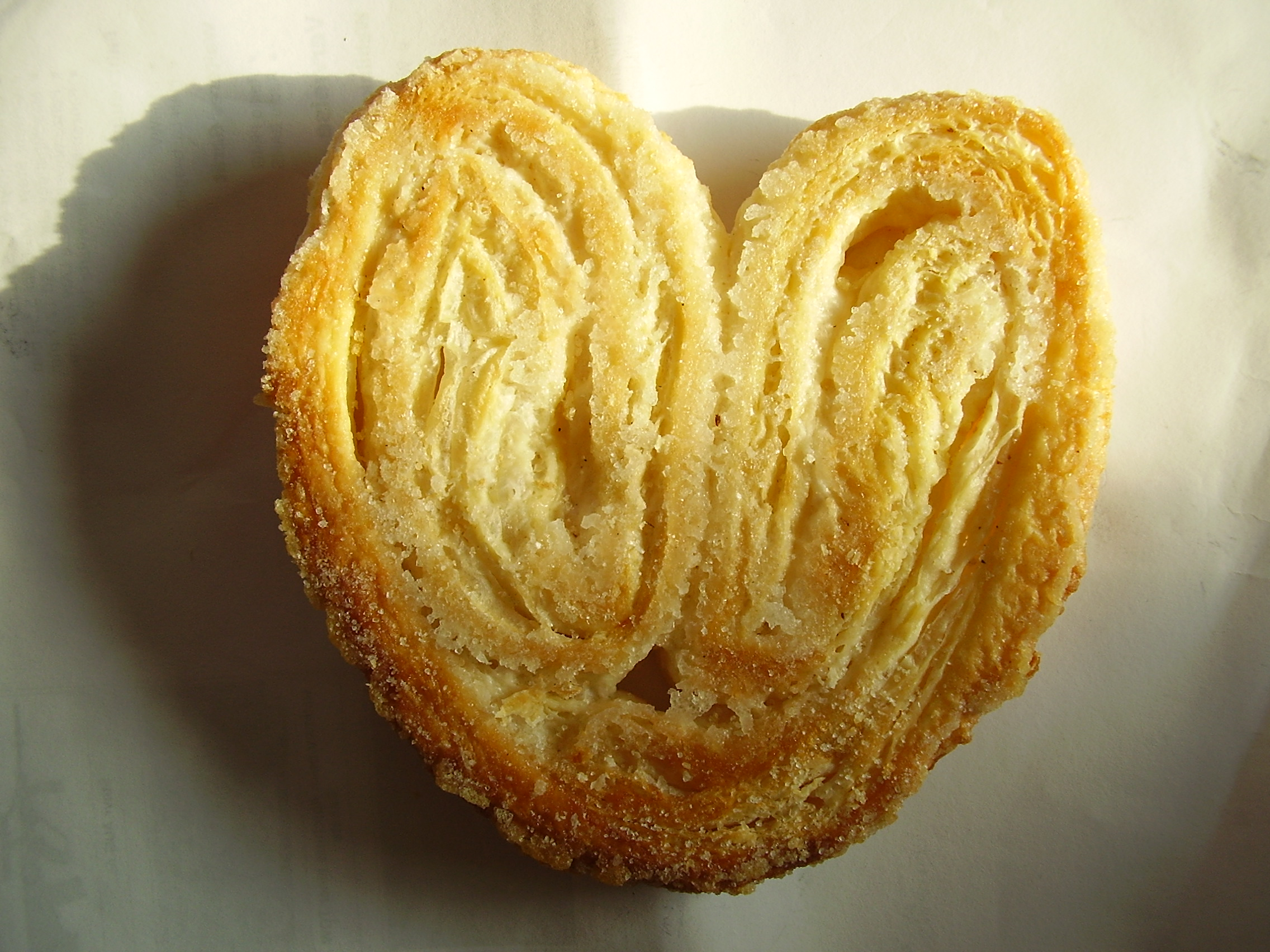
A palmier, or "palm leaf", design

The oldest known documented recipe for flaky pastry in France was included in a charter by Robert, bishop of Amiens in 1311. The first recipe to explicitly use the technique of tourage (the action of encasing solid butter within dough layers, keeping the fat intact and separate, by folding several times) was published in 1651 by François Pierre La Varenne in Le cuisinier français. Modern French puff pastry was then developed and improved by the chef M. Feuillet and Antonin Carême.

The method is sometimes considered the idea of the famous painter Claude Gellée when he was an apprentice baker in 1612. Historical evidence for this is negligible, but it is retained as culinary lore. The story goes that Lorrain was making a type of very buttery bread for his sick father, and the process of rolling the butter into the bread dough created a croissant-like finished product.

== Production ==
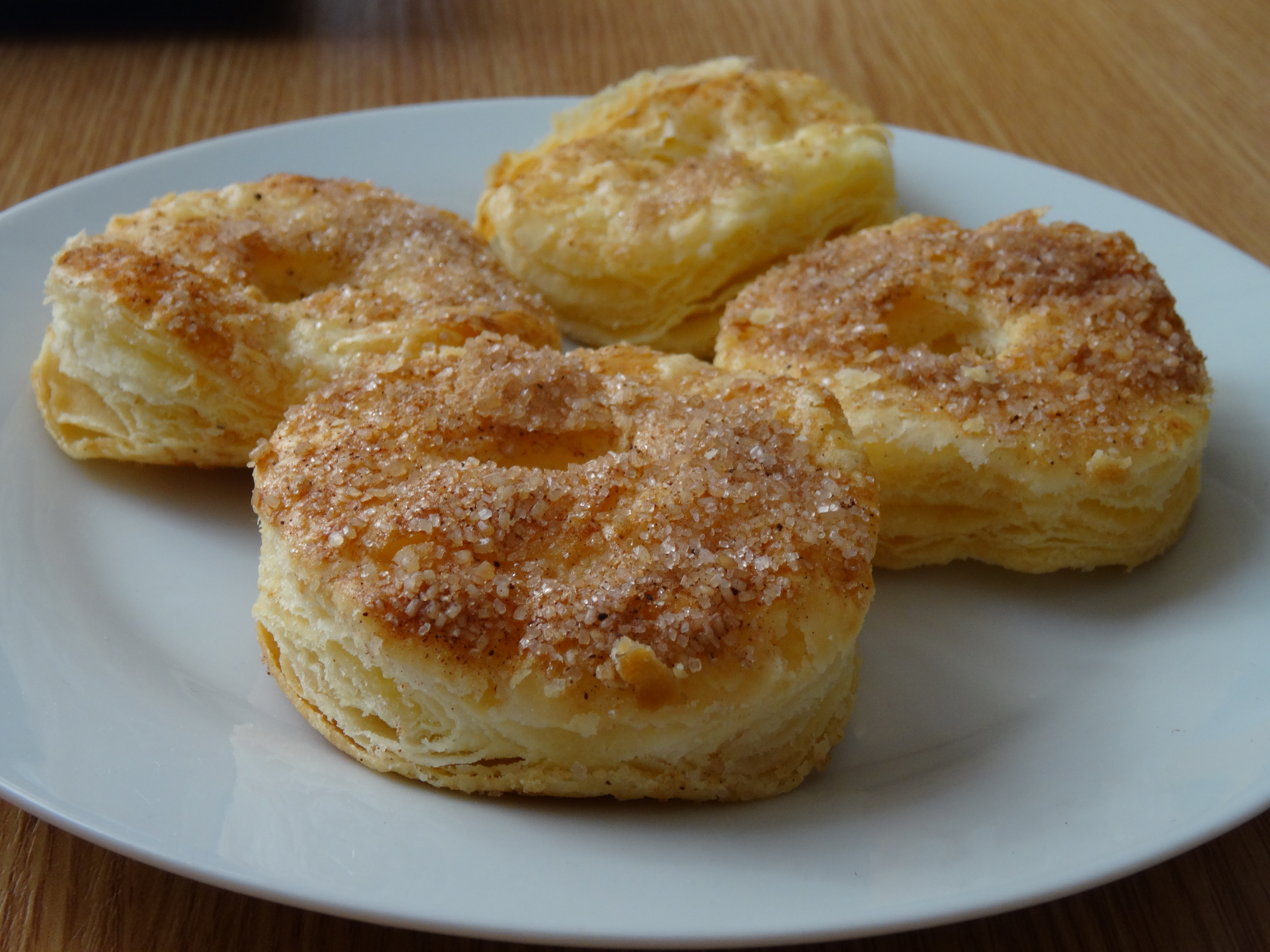
Home made puff pastries with sugar

The production of puff pastry dough can be time-consuming, because it must be kept at a temperature of approximately 16 °C (60 °F) to keep the shortening from melting and the layers melding; it must rest in between folds to allow gluten strands time to link up and thus retain layering. Therefore, between each step the dough is rested and chilled. Before re-rolling, the dough is rotated ninety degrees, so that it is rolled at right angle relative to the previous "turn" (as each step is usually referred to). After rolling, another thin layer of butter is applied, the folding and resting are repeated. The chef Julia Child's method has 72 layers (Note: The number 72 refers to the layers of butter only; there are also 73 layers of dough, for 145 layers in all. The process demonstrated in Child's recipe uses a mixture of folds. After an initial trifold (two layers of butter, three of dough), the next step given for the pâte demi-feuilletée is a "book fold" (each end of pastry is folded over to meet in the middle; this is then doubled on itself), without additional butter at this point, resulting in eight layers of butter and nine of dough. Two additional trifold steps are made, so these eight layers are then tripled twice over (8 × 3 =24; 24 × 3=72).) for rough-puff pastry (pâte demi-feuilletée) and 729 layers (Note: The classic French puff pastry demonstrated in Child's book sandwiches a layer of butter between two of dough in its first step (resulting in two layers of dough, one of butter). There follows six trifold "turns" (i.e. 3^{6}) giving 729 layers (of butter and 730 of dough – 1459 layers in total).) for pâte feuilletée fine.

The number of layers in puff pastry is calculated with the formula:

$\ell=(f + 1)^n$

where $\ell$ is the number of finished layers, $f$ the number of folds in a single folding move, and $n$ is how many times the folding move is repeated. For example, twice-folding (i.e. in three), repeated four times gives $(2 + 1)^4 = 81$ layers.

Commercially made puff pastry is available in grocery stores. Common types of fat used include butter, vegetable shortenings, lard and margarine. Butter is the most common type used because it provides a richer taste and superior mouthfeel. Shortenings and lard have a higher melting point therefore puff pastry made with either will rise more than pastry made with butter, if made correctly. Puff pastry made in this manner will, however, often have a waxy mouthfeel and more bland flavor. Specialized margarine formulated for high plasticity (the ability to spread very thin without breaking apart) is used for industrial production of puff pastry.

== Variants and distinctions ==
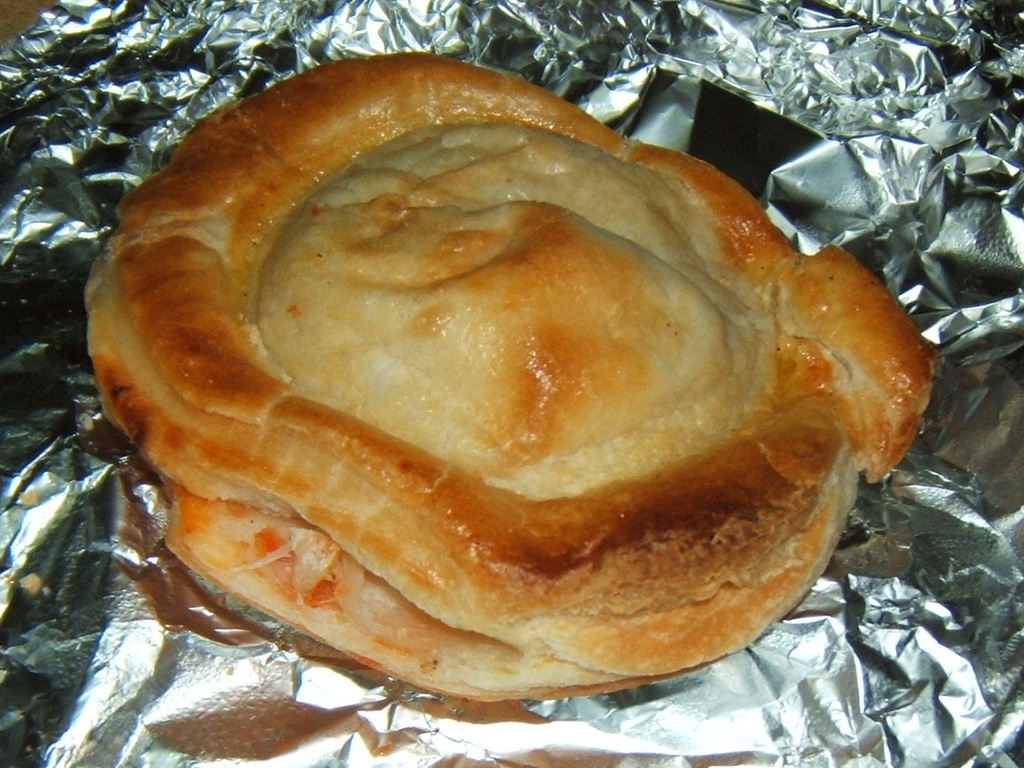
Rustico leccese: Puff pastry filled with mozzarella, béchamel, tomato, pepper and nutmeg

Since the process of making puff pastry is generally laborious and time-intensive, faster recipes are fairly common: known as "blitz", "rough puff", or "flaky pastry". Some of these recipes combine the butter into the détrempe rather than adding it in the folding process and are thus similar to a folded short crust. Many retain the layering process, but the number of steps ("turns" or "tours") is reduced. Alternatively, or in addition, the butter is scattered over the dough-layer surface in small pieces, or grated, rather than in a single mass or block. Time and effort to evenly distribute the fat in a single mass is thus avoided, and chilling time may be reduced as less handling of the butter generally keeps it at a lower temperature.

This process makes rough-puff more similar to another laminated pastry, filo (or phyllo). The dough for phyllo is stretched and rolled to its final pre-baking size. Layering is done immediately before baking, with a small amount of oil or melted fat (usually butter) brushed on one layer of dough, which is then topped with another layer that is also brushed with the fat; the layering is repeated as often as desired. When the filo bakes it becomes crispy, but since it contains somewhat less water, it does not expand to the same degree as puff pastry. Puff pastry also differs from Austrian strudel dough, or strudelteig, which more closely resembles filo, in that strudelteig is stretched (and rolled) into a very thin sheet. Most of the fat is incorporated into strudelteig, rather than applied to sheets. For strudel, pastry layers are achieved by rolling the (lightly fat-coated) dough around the filling multiple times; some filo pastry dishes also use this method.

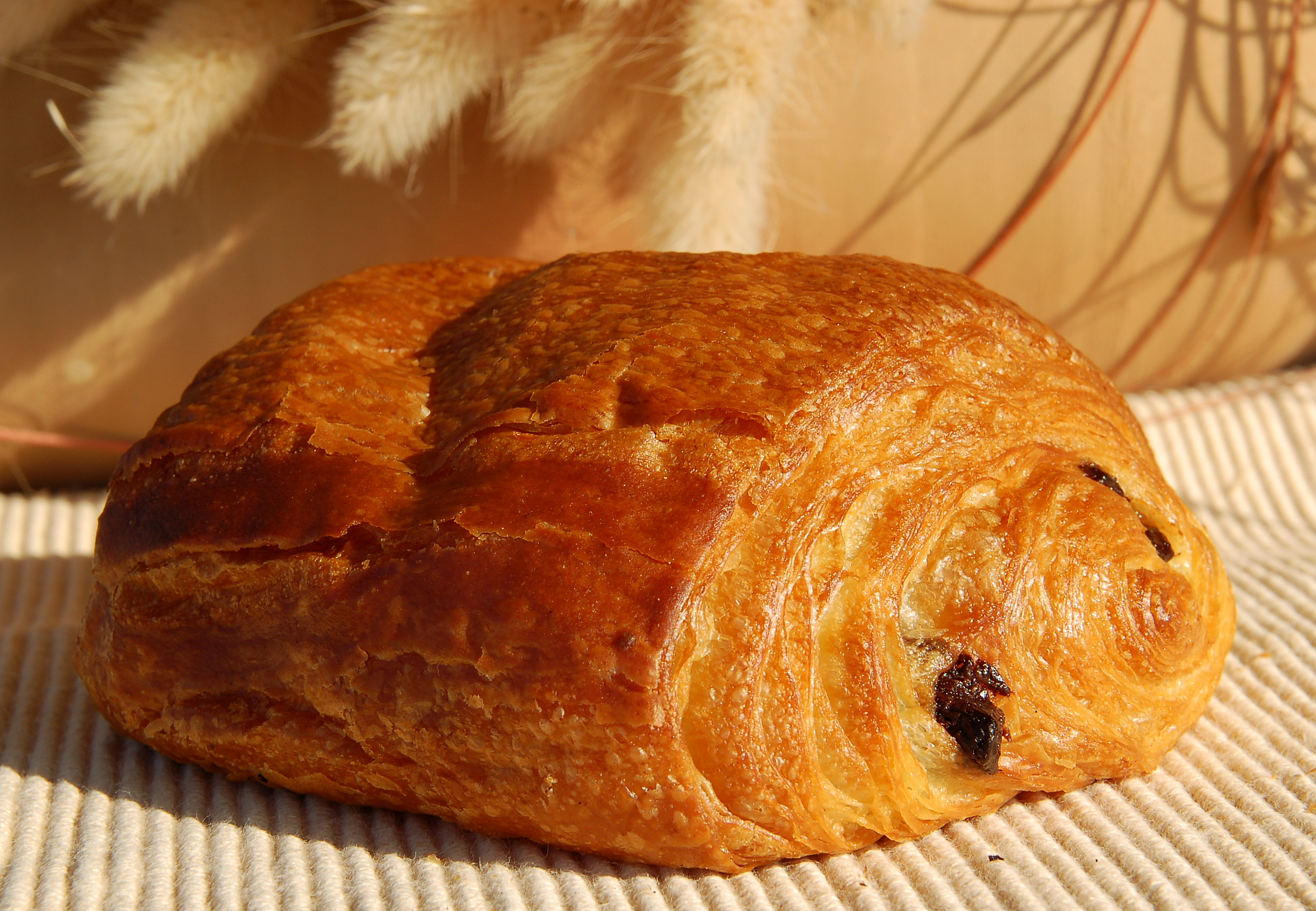
Pain au chocolat, a type of Viennoiserie

Similar to puff pastry, Viennoiserie, is a baker's yeast leavened dough, is used to create croissants, Danish pastry or pain au chocolat. Viennoiserie is considered a separate category of dough and is neither a pastry nor a bread.

== Uses ==
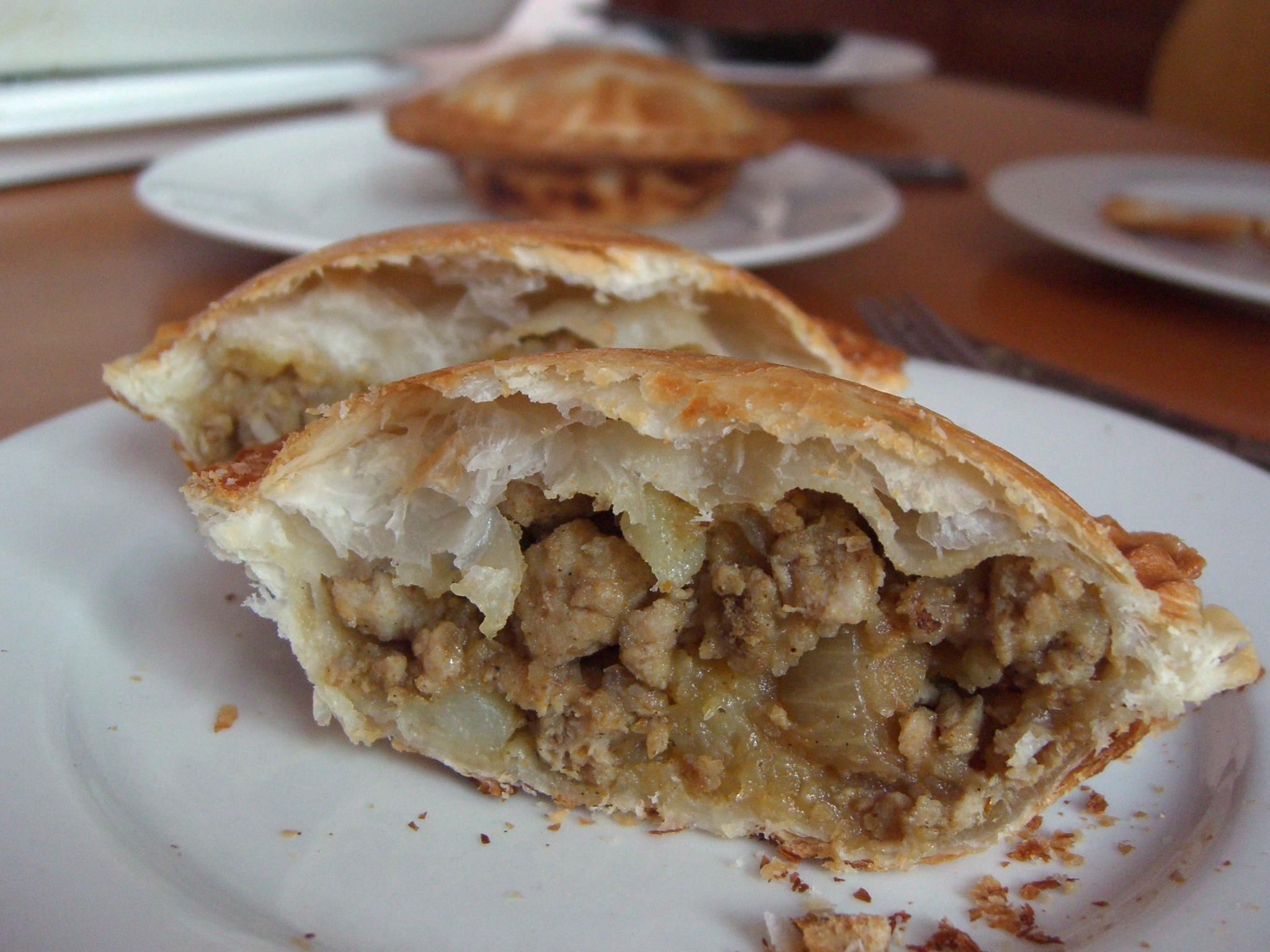
A chicken pot pie made with puff pastry

- Beef Wellington
- Galette des rois
- Jambons
- Miguelitos
- Mille-feuille
- Palmier
- Pastel de nata
- Pithivier
- Sausage rolls
- Steak and kidney pie
  - other pies
- Conversation tart
- Tarte Tatin
- Turnovers

== See also ==
- Apple strudel
- List of butter dishes
- List of pastries
- Rustico (pastry)
