= Pecan pie =

Pie made primarily with corn syrup and pecans

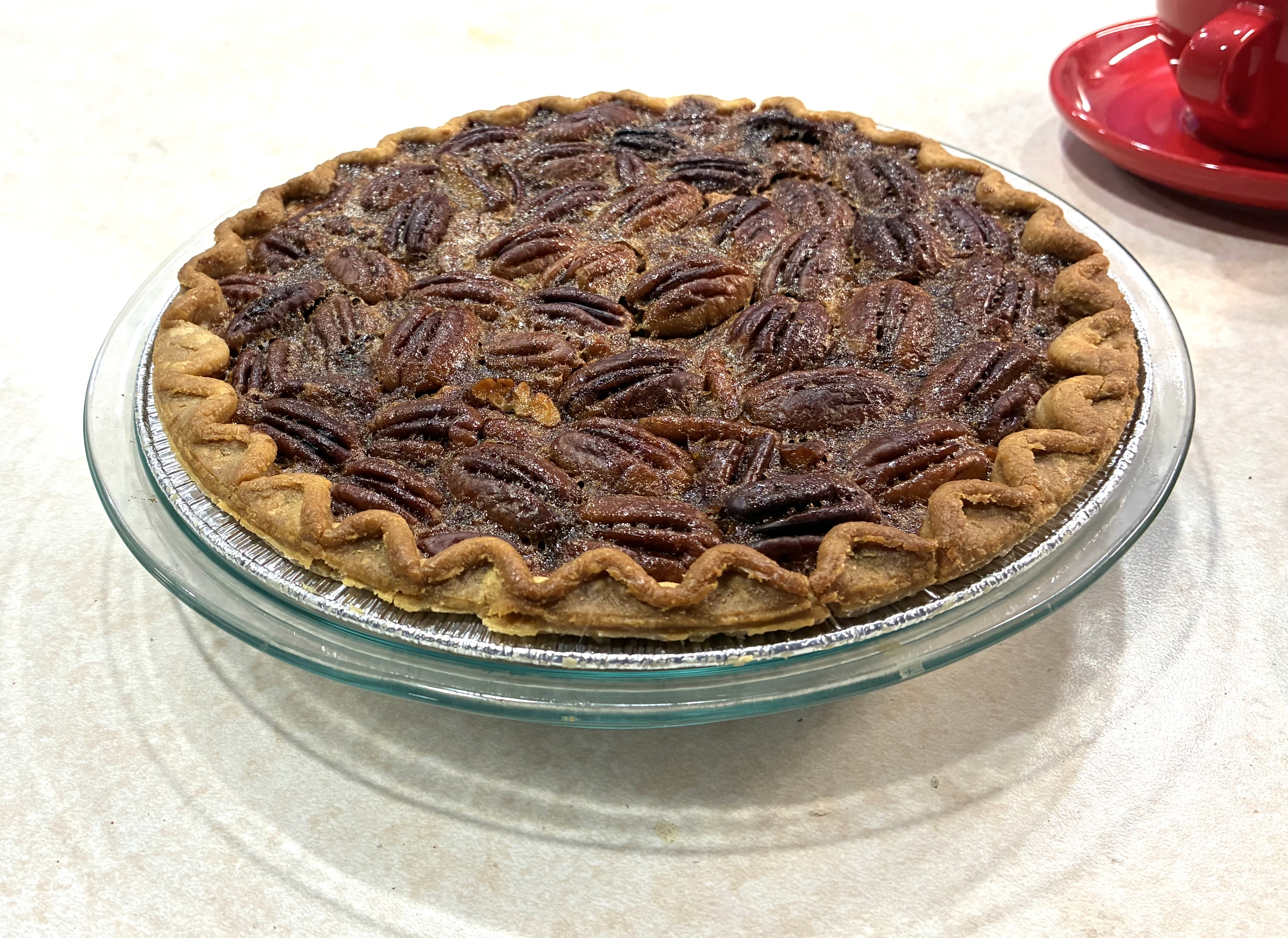
- Course: Dessert
- Place of origin: Southern United States
- Main ingredients: Pecan and corn syrup
- Food energy (per serving): 503 kcal (2,100 kJ)

Pecan pie is a pie of pecan nuts mixed with a filling of eggs, butter and sugar (typically corn syrup). Variations may include white or brown sugar, cane syrup, sugar syrup, molasses, maple syrup, or honey. It is commonly served at holiday meals in the United States and is considered a specialty of Southern U.S. origin. Most pecan pie recipes include salt and vanilla as flavorings. Pecan pie may be served with whipped cream, vanilla ice cream or hard sauce.

== Origin ==
Attempts to trace the dish's origin have not found any recipes dated earlier than a pecan custard pie recipe published in Harper's Bazaar in 1886. Pecan pie was made before the invention of corn syrup, and older recipes used darker sugar-based syrup or molasses. The 1929 congressional club cookbook has a recipe for the pie which used only eggs, milk, sugar and pecans. The makers of Karo syrup significantly contributed to popularizing the dish and many of the recipes for variants (caramel, cinnamon, Irish cream, peanut butter, etc.) of the classic pie. The company has claimed that the dish was a 1930s "discovery" of a "new use for corn syrup" by a corporate sales executive's wife. Well-known cookbooks such as Fannie Farmer and The Joy of Cooking did not include this dessert before 1940. Pecan pie came to be closely associated with the culture of the Southern United States in the 1940s and 1950s.

Pecans are native to the southern United States. Archaeological evidence found in Texas indicates that Native Americans used pecans more than 8,000 years ago. The word pecan is a derivative from the early 18th century of an Algonquin word, pakani, referring to a nut.

Sugar pies such as treacle tart were attested in medieval Europe, and adapted in North America to the ingredients available, resulting in such dishes as shoofly pie, sugar cream pie, butter tart and chess pie. Some Pecan pie recipes may be a variant of chess pie, which is made with a similar butter-sugar-egg plus the addition of milk or condensed milk to make a true custard.

Some have stated that the French invented pecan pie soon after settling in New Orleans, after being introduced to the pecan nut by the Native American Quinipissa and Tangipahoa tribes. Claims have also been made of pecan pie existing in the early 1800s in Alabama, but this does not appear to be supported by recipes or literature.

== Cultural context ==
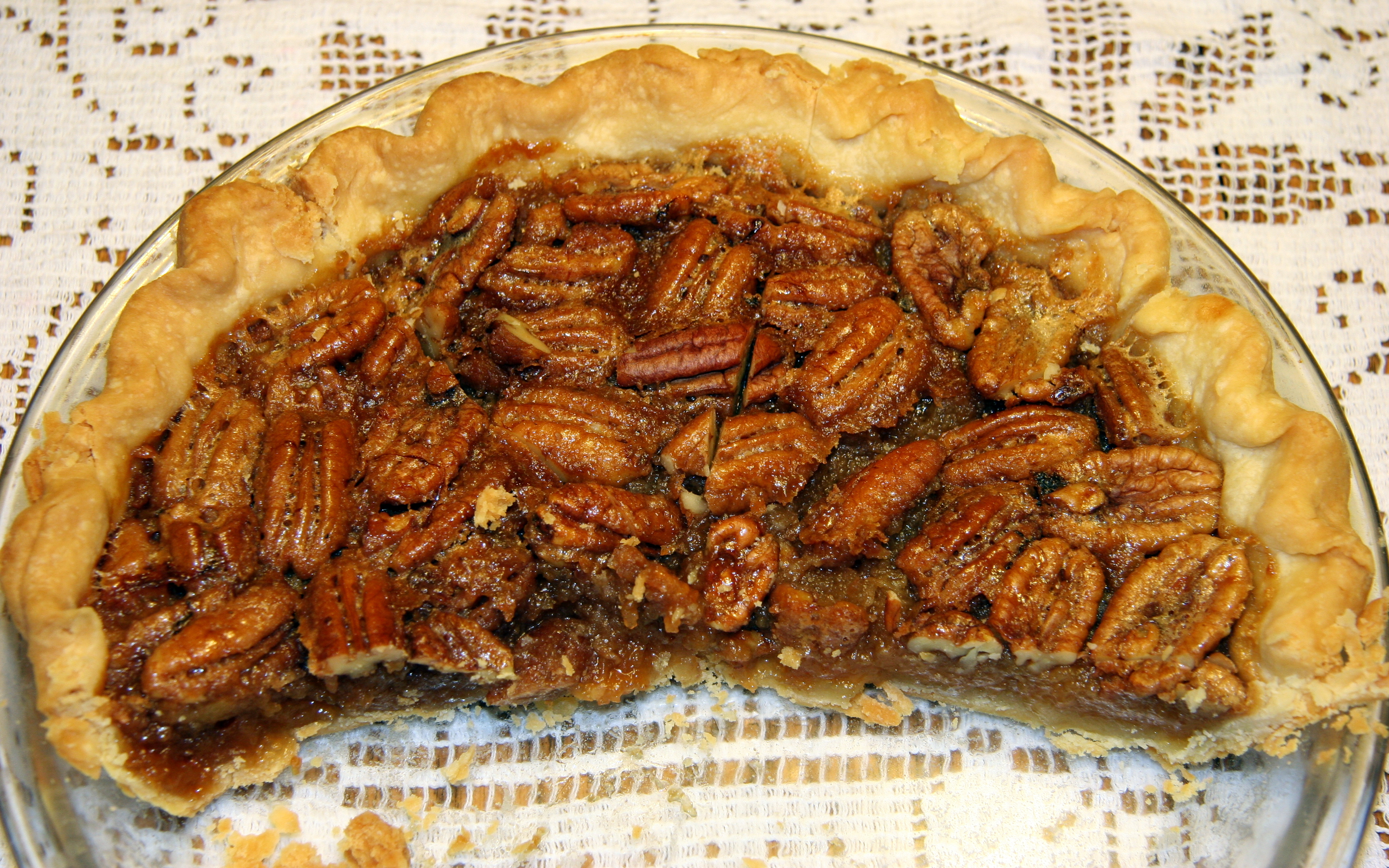
Half of a pecan pie

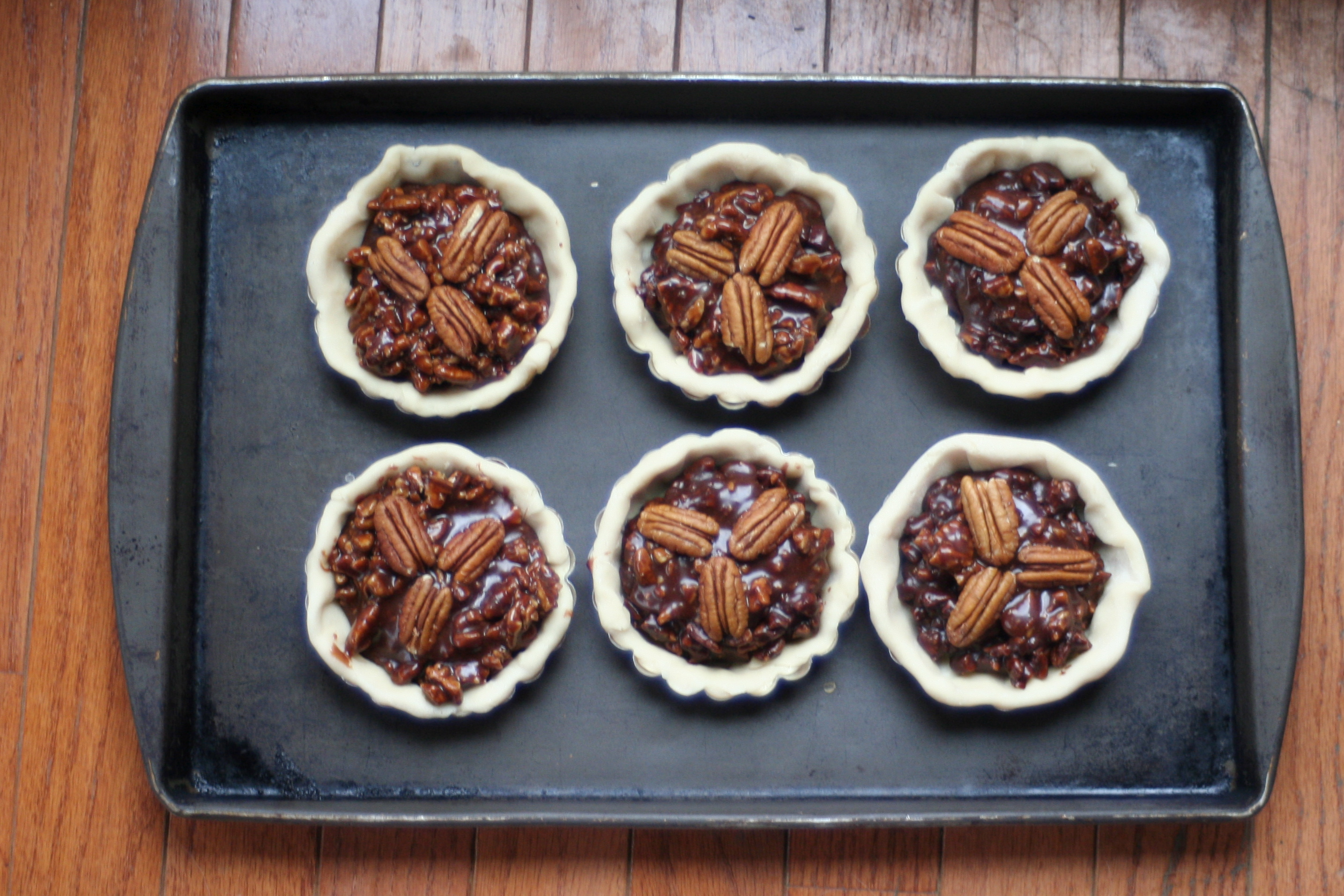
Chocolate pecan tarts prior to baking

Pecan pie is often mentioned in American literature (and television) and is associated with Thanksgiving, Christmas, and other special occasions; for example:

Dooley handed them a basket stuffed with fruit, nuts, candy, a tinned ham, and a pecan pie. "Merry Christmas!" he said.

— Jan Karon, A Light in the Window

The only kitchen item I usually bring to Italy is plastic wrap... This time, however, I have brought one bag of Georgia pecans and a can of cane syrup, pecan pie being a necessary ingredient of Christmas.

— Frances Mayes, Under the Tuscan Sun

Pecan pie is a staple of the Southern U.S., and is often used in literary context as a symbol of the South; for example:

Beneath the shade of a Georgia pine
And that's home you know
Sweet tea, pecan pie and homemade wine
Where the peaches grow

— Zac Brown

The Texas Legislature designated pecan pie as the official "State Pie of Texas" in 2013.

== Variations ==
=== Alice Colombo's Race Day chocolate pecan pie ===
This pie is named after Alice Colombo, who was a food editor for the Louisville Courier-Journal in Kentucky. This pie was made by her on the occasion of the Kentucky Derby. The special ingredients suggested in the recipe include cornstarch, to soften the top, bourbon, chocolate chips and whipped cream.

=== Butterscotch ===
Characterized by the addition of butterscotch chips and brown sugar (in addition to, not in place of, corn syrup).

=== Chocolate brownie ===
This pie has nuts on the surface and it is layered with chocolate pudding and fudge. It is served at room temperature or chilled.

=== Maple ===
Includes maple syrup and almond extract.

=== Pecan tassies ===
Pecan tassies are a mini variation of a pecan pie, baked in small cups (traditionally) or more commonly in mini-muffin pans. The recipe first appeared in US newspapers in the 1950–60s, and was also shown in the movie Steel Magnolias. The origin of the name is unclear, but most recipes mention that "tassie" is the Scottish word for little cup or glass, and that in French a small cup is "la tasse."

=== Sawdust pie ===
Sawdust Pie consists of an egg-batter filling with coconut, graham cracker crumbs and pecans, topped with whipped cream and sliced bananas. This pie originated in the late 1800s from Patti's Restaurant in Grand Rivers, Kentucky. The name is due to the texture of the pie filling.

=== Transparent pie ===
There are many variations of transparent pie recipes, but one version is a regular pecan pie recipe with pecans omitted, and vanilla replaced with nutmeg or lemon juice. This pie can be served at room temperature or chilled, but when it is served at room temperature it looks transparent.

=== Whiskey chocolate chip ===
In this pie, chocolate chips and a few teaspoons of Jack Daniel whiskey are added.

== Retail sales ==
In the United States, pecan pies are sold at bakeries, cafes, farmers markets, and grocery stores.

== See also ==
- Appalachian cuisine
- Walnut pie
- List of pies, tarts and flans
- List of Christmas dishes
