= Pastafrola =

Type of sweet tart

Pasta frolla or Pastafrola
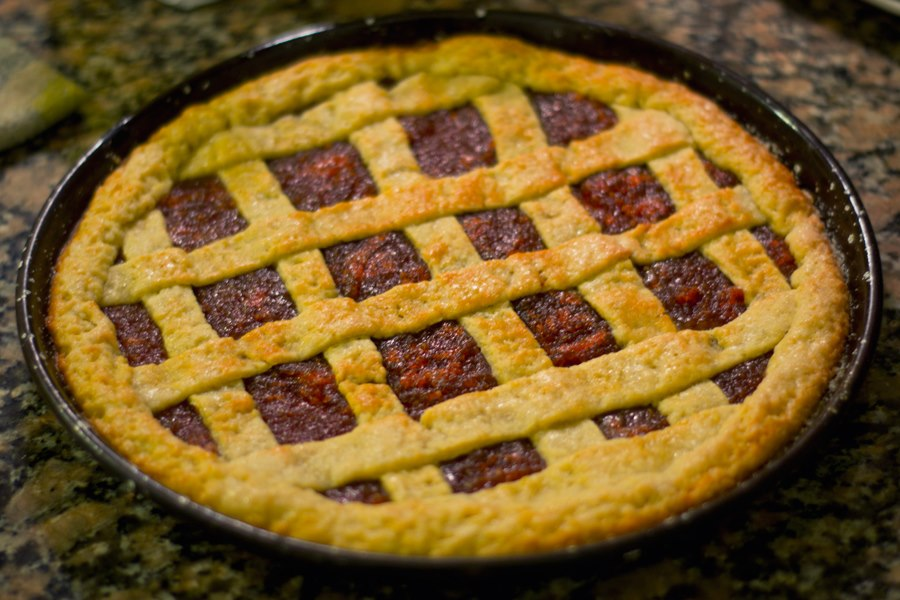
- An Argentine pastafrola in a baking tray
- Type: Dessert
- Place of origin: Italy
- Main ingredients: Flour, butter, sugar, eggs
- Variations: Streusel

Pastafrola, pasta frolla or pastaflora (Greek: πάστα φλώρα) is a type of sweet tart that originated in Italy and is common in Argentina, Paraguay, Uruguay, Egypt and Greece. It is a covered, jam-filled shortcrust pastry dish principally made from flour, sugar and egg. Common fillings include quince cheese, dulce de batata (sweet potato jam), dulce de leche, guava, or strawberry jam. The covering of the tart is a thin-striped lattice which displays the filling beneath in rhomboidal or square sections. Pastafrola is most usually oven-baked in a circular shape. Most of the Greek versions of this dish are filled with sweet jam: it is considered a morning dessert.

The name of the dish comes from pasta frolla (lit. 'friable pastry'), Italian for shortcrust pastry, and is similar to the Italian crostata. Italian immigrants brought it to Paraguay, Uruguay and Argentina.

Similar dishes include the Austrian Linzer torte and Swiss tarts with a spiced-fruit filling. In Greek, the word frolla was misinterpreted as the Italian word flora.

The dish is served as an afternoon dessert (merienda) or with mate (a South American drink), but may be eaten at any time of the day.

== Ingredients ==
The ingredients for the dish are:

- Flour
- Egg
- Sugar
- Butter or margarine
- Jam filling (most common are quince, sweet potato jam, dulce de leche, guava, or strawberry)
- Lemon zest
- Vanilla extract
