= Infobox =

Method of organizing information

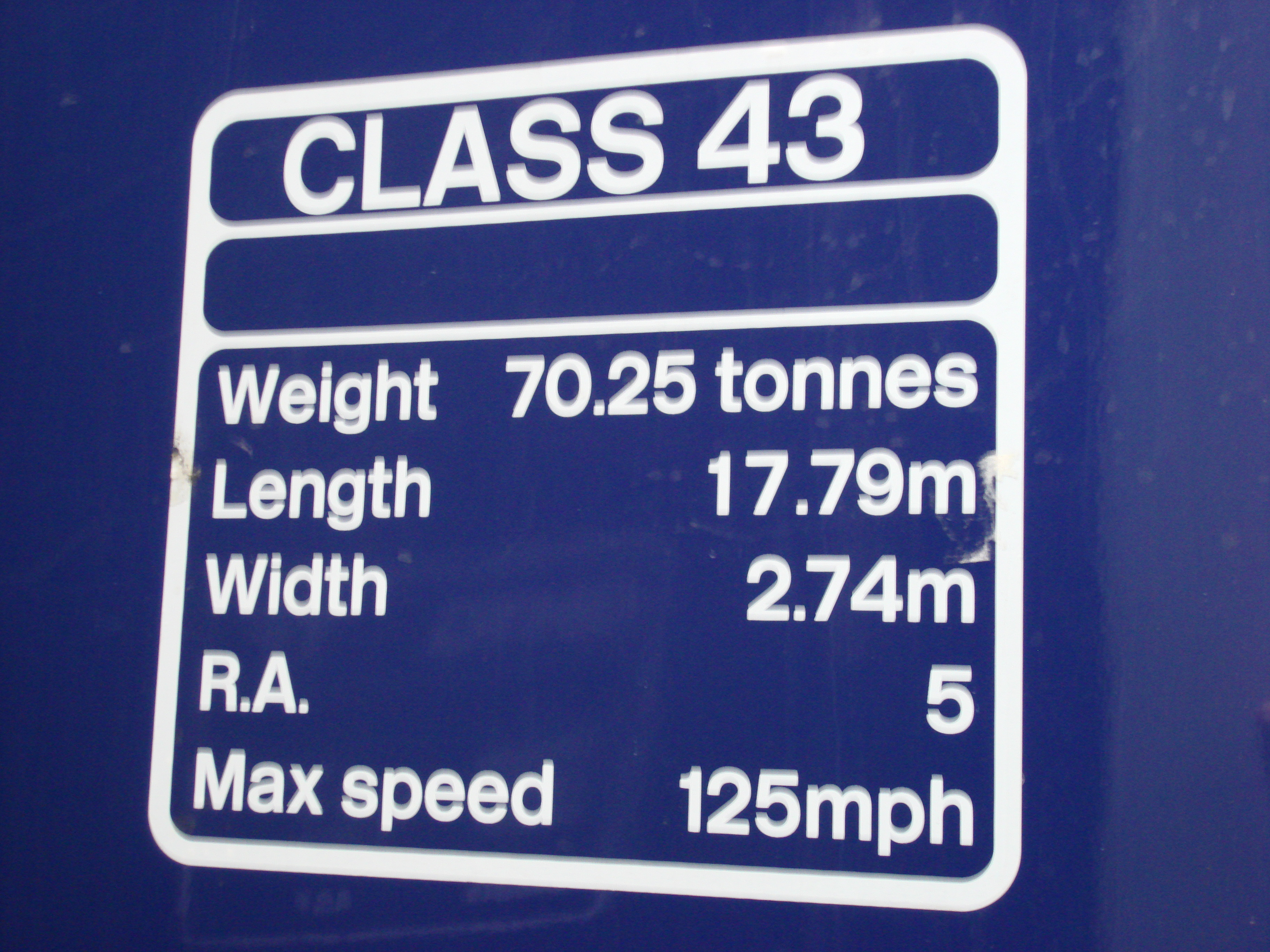
A real-life infobox from British Rail Class 43 car 43185 operated by First Great Western

An infobox is a digital or physical table used to collect and present a subset of information about its subject, such as a document. It is a structured document containing a set of attribute–value pairs, and in Wikipedia represents a summary of information about the subject of an article. In this way, they are comparable to data tables in some aspects. When presented within the larger document it summarizes, an infobox is often presented in a sidebar format.

An infobox may be implemented in another document by transcluding it into that document and specifying some or all of the attribute–value pairs associated with that infobox, known as parameterization.

== Wikipedia ==
An infobox may be used to summarize the information of an article on Wikipedia. They are used on similar articles to ensure consistency of presentation by using a common format. Originally, infoboxes (and templates in general) were used for page layout purposes. An infobox may be transcluded into an article by specifying the value for some or all of its parameters. The parameter name used must be the same as that specified in the infobox template, but any value may be associated to it. The name is delimited from the value by an equals sign. The parameter name may be regarded as an attribute of the article's subject.

{{Infobox food
| name = 
| image = 
| image_size = 
| caption = 
| alternate_name = 
| country = 
| region = 
| creator = 
| course = 
| type = 
| served = 
| main_ingredient = 
| variations = 
| calories = 
| other = 
}}

The infobox Infobox food used on Wikipedia food-related articles, with no values specified for its parameters (attributes).

{{Infobox food
| name = Crostata
| image = Crostata limone e zenzero 3.jpg
| image_size = 
| caption = Crostata with lemon ginger filling
| alternate_name = 
| country = [[Italy]]
| region = [[Lombardia]]
| creator = 
| course = [[Dessert]]
| type = [[Tart]]
| served = 
| main_ingredient = Pastry crust, [[jam]] or [[ricotta]], fruit
| variations = ''Crostata di frutta'', ''crostata di ricotta'', many other sweet or savoury variations
| calories = 
| other = 
}}

The same infobox as implemented in the article crostata. Values are to the right of the equals sign (=), and that the parameter names are the same as those in the specification for the infobox template. The values are in wiki markup: entries enclosed in square brackets (e.g. [[Tart]]) will be rendered as a link to the respective Wikipedia article (e.g. Tart), and the linked file will be transcluded into the article in place of its markup.

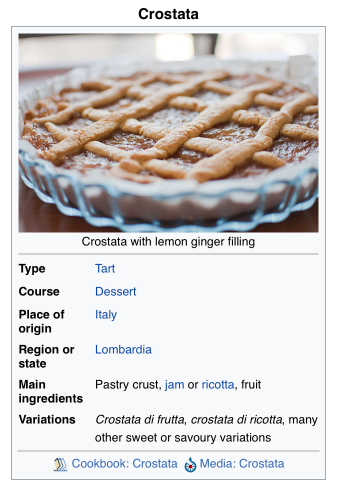
The infobox for the Wikipedia article Crostata rendered by a web browser engine on a desktop computer

On Wikipedia, an infobox is transcluded into an article by enclosing its name and attribute–value pairs within a double set of braces. The MediaWiki software on which Wikipedia operates then parses the document, for which the infobox and other templates are processed by a template processor. This is a template engine which produces a web document and a style sheet used for presentation of the document. This enables the design of the infobox to be separated from the content it manipulates; that is, the design of the template may be updated without affecting the information within it, and the new design will automatically propagate to all articles that transclude the infobox. Usually, infoboxes are formatted to appear in the top-right corner of a Wikipedia article in the desktop view, or at the top in the mobile view.

Placement of an infobox within the wikitext of an article is important for accessibility. A best practice is to place them following disambiguation templates (those that direct readers to articles about topics with similar names) and maintenance templates (such as that marking an article as unreferenced), but before all other content.

Baeza-Yates and King say that some editors find templates such as infoboxes complicated, as the template may hide text about a property or resource that the editor wishes to change; this is exacerbated by chained templates, that is templates transcluded within other templates.

As of August 2009, English Wikipedia used about 3,000 infobox templates that collectively used more than 20,000 attributes. Since then, many have been merged, to reduce redundancy. As of June 2013, there were at least 1,345,446 transclusions of the parent Infobox template, used by some, but not all, infoboxes, on 4,251,127 articles.

The name of an Infobox is typically "Infobox [genre]"; however, widely used infoboxes may be assigned shorter names, such as "taxobox" for taxonomy.

=== Machine learning ===
About 44.2% of Wikipedia articles contained an infobox in 2008, and about 33% in 2010. Automated semantic knowledge extraction using machine learning algorithms is used to "extract machine-processable information at a relatively low complexity cost". However, the low coverage makes it more difficult, though this can be partially overcome by complementing article data with that in categories in which the article is included. The French Wikipedia initiated the project Infobox Version 2 in May 2011.

Knowledge obtained by machine learning can be used to improve an article, such as by using automated software suggestions to editors for adding infobox data. The iPopulator project created a system to add a value to an article's infobox parameter via an automated parsing of the text of that article.

DBpedia uses structured content extracted from infoboxes by machine learning algorithms to create a resource of linked data in the Semantic Web; it has been described by Tim Berners-Lee as "one of the more famous" components of the linked data project.

Machine extraction creates a triple consisting of a subject, predicate or relation, and object. Each attribute-value pair of the infobox is used to create an RDF statement using an ontology. This is facilitated by the narrower gap between Wikipedia and an ontology than exists between unstructured or free text and an ontology.

The semantic relationship between the subject and object is established by the predicate. In the example infobox, the triple ("crostata", type, "tart") indicates that a crostata is a type of tart. The article's topic is used as the subject, the parameter name is used as the predicate, and the parameter's value as the object. Each type of infobox is mapped to an ontology class, and each property (parameter) within an infobox is mapped to an ontology property. These mappings are used when parsing a Wikipedia article to extract data.

=== Metadata ===
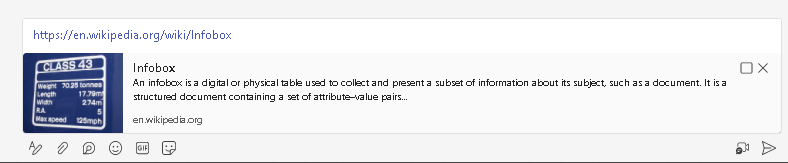
A link to this article, pasted into a message box in Microsoft Teams. The application uses the metadata from the infobox to make the link fuller by adding an image and summary text.

Presenting the basic facts of an article within an infobox allows the facts to be presented in a machine-friendly way, allowing extra functionality such as when a link to a Wikipedia article is pasted into a compatible program; instead of just the link itself being posted, other information such as the article's lead image is also posted.

== See also ==
- Wikipedia:List of infoboxes

== Works cited ==
- Baeza-Yates, Ricardo; King, Irwin, eds. (2009). Weaving services and people on the World Wide Web. Springer. ISBN 9783642005695. LCCN 2009926100.
- Broughton, John (2008-07-14). Barber, Nan; Meyers, Peter (eds.). Wikipedia – The Missing Manual. O'Reilly Media. ISBN 9780596553777.
- Geertman, Stan; Reinhardt, Wolfgang; Toppen, Fred, eds. (2011). Advancing geoinformation science for a changing world. Lecture Notes in Geoinformation and Cartography. Vol. 1. Springer. doi:10.1007/978-3-642-19789-5. ISBN 9783642197888. ISSN 1863-2246. LCCN 2011925152.
- Lange, Dustin; Böhm, Christoph; Naumann, Felix (2010). Extracting Structured Information from Wikipedia Articles to Populate Infoboxes. Vol. Technische Berichte des Hasso-Plattner-Instituts für Softwaresystemtechnik an der Universität Potsdam, Hasso-Plattner-Institut für Softwaresystemtechnik Potsdam. Universitätsverlag Potsdam. ISBN 9783869560816. Archived from the original on 2014-06-06.
- Yu, Liyang (2011). A Developer's Guide to the Semantic Web. Springer. Bibcode:2011adgt.book.....Y. doi:10.1007/978-3-642-15970-1. ISBN 9783642159695.
- Miller, Paul (2008-02-07). "Sir Tim Berners-Lee Talks with Talis about the Semantic Web". Transcription by CastingWords. Talis Group. Archived from the original on 2013-05-10.
- Virvou, Maria; Matsuura, Saeko, eds. (2012). Knowledge-based Software Engineering: Proceedings of the Tenth Joint Conference on Knowledge-Based Software Engineering. Frontiers and Artificial Intelligence and Applications. Vol. 240. IOS Press. ISBN 9781614990932. LCCN 2012943674.
