= Treacle tart =

British dessert

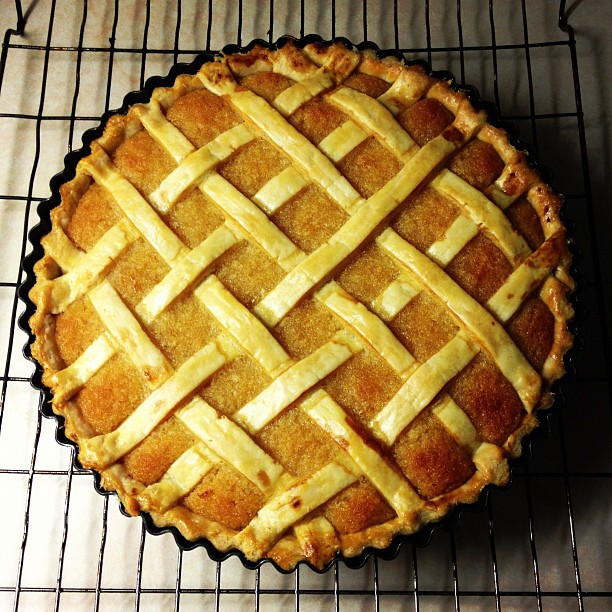
- Course: Dessert
- Place of origin: United Kingdom
- Serving temperature: Hot or warm
- Main ingredients: Shortcrust pastry, golden syrup, breadcrumbs, lemon juice

Treacle tart is a British tart with a filling made from golden syrup. The earliest known recipe is from the English author Mary Jewry in her cookbooks from the late 19th century; however, mentions of treacle tarts predate her cookbooks. For example, in April 1828, a Mrs. Delafields of Fan-street (a treacle tarts, green-grocery and periwinkles seller) in London appeared upon summons as to why she was allowed to keep a ferocious dog after a complaint was made against her.

== Desserts ==
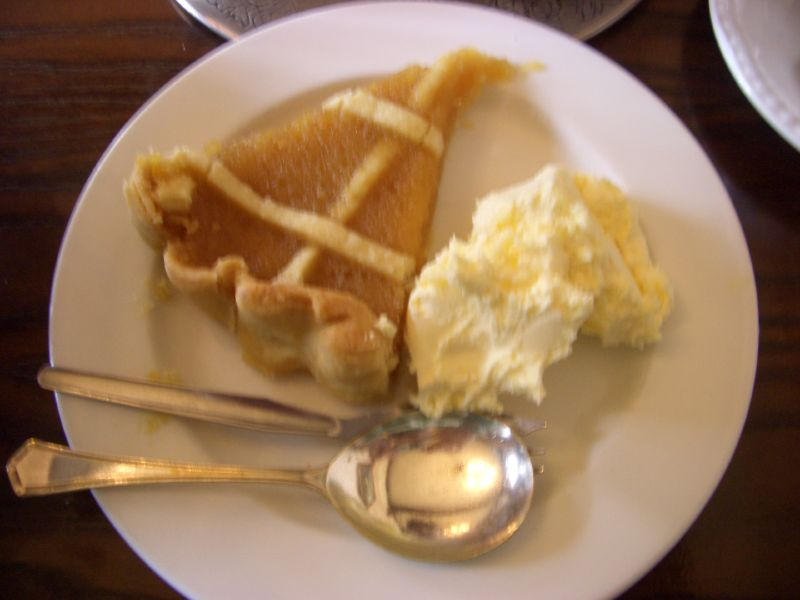
Treacle tart served with clotted cream

Treacle tart is prepared using shortcrust pastry, with a thick filling made from golden syrup (also known as light treacle), breadcrumbs, and lemon juice or zest. The tart is normally served hot or warm with a scoop of clotted cream, ordinary cream, ice cream, or custard. Some modern recipes add cream, eggs, or both to create a softer filling.

== See also ==
- Butter tart
- List of pies, tarts and flans
- Tarte au sucre
