= Butter tart =

Canadian dessert pastry

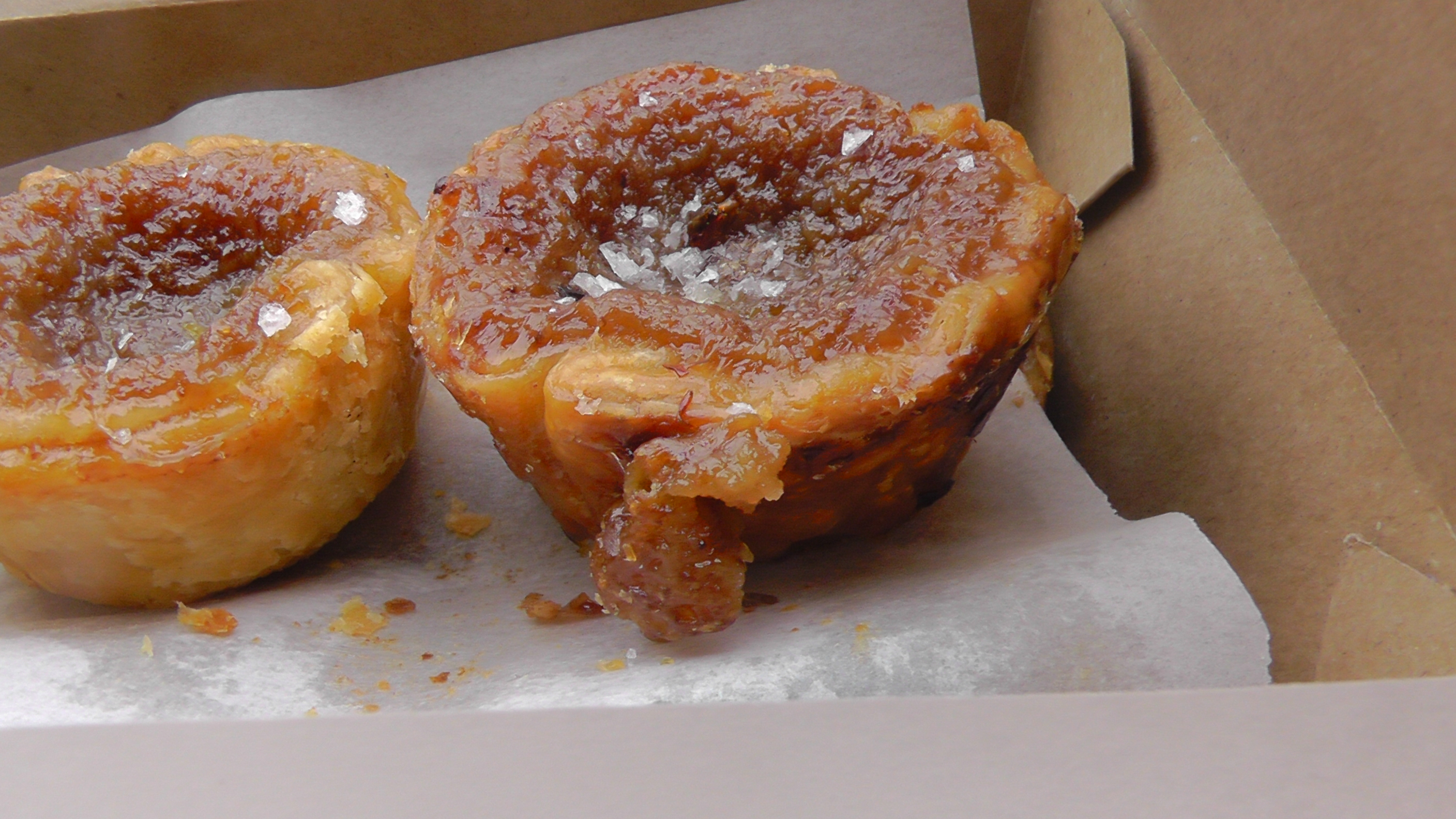
- A pair of plain butter tarts with some salt
- Type: Pastry
- Course: Snack or Dessert
- Place of origin: Canada
- Main ingredients: Pastry shell, butter, sugar, syrup, eggs
- Variations: Addition of raisins, walnuts or pecans or other flavourings
- Food energy (per serving): 580 kcal (2,400 kJ)

A butter tart (French: tarte au beurre) is a type of small pastry tart highly regarded in Canadian cuisine. The sweet tart consists of a filling of butter, brown sugar, maple syrup, and egg, baked in a pastry shell until the filling is semi-solid with a crunchy top. The butter tart should not be confused with butter pie (a savoury pie from the Preston area of Lancashire, England) or with bread and butter pudding.

Recipes for the butter tart vary according to the families baking them. Because of this, the appearance and physical characteristics of the butter tart – the firmness of its pastry, or the consistency of its filling – also vary.

Traditionally, the English Canadian tart consists of butter, sugar, and eggs in a pastry shell, similar to the French-Canadian sugar pie. The butter tart is different from the sugar pie given the lack of flour in the filling. The butter tart is different from the American pecan pie in that it has a "runnier" filling due to the omission of corn starch. Often raisins, walnuts, or pecans are added to the traditional butter tart, although the acceptability of such additions is a matter of national debate. As an iconic Canadian food and one of the most popular desserts in the country, the raisin-or-no-raisin question can provoke polarizing debate.

More exotic flavours are also produced by some bakers. Examples such as maple, bacon, pumpkin spice, chili, and salted caramel cardamom flavours have been made for competitions.

== History ==
Butter tarts became common in Canadian pioneer cooking, and they remain a characteristic pastry of Canada. It is primarily eaten in and associated with the English-speaking provinces of Canada.

The butter tart is a derivative of one or more of the following:

- Border tart: a similar pie including dried fruit from the Anglo-Scottish border country,
- Sugar pie (tarte au sucre): which possibly came with the arrival of the "King's Daughters" in Quebec during the 1600s, where the imported brides used maple syrup, butter and dried fruit to make a possible precursor to modern examples of the butter tart. The butter tart is sometimes described as a smaller, tart-sized version of the sugar pie.
- Pecan pie: which possibly came north from the southern United States,
- Backwoods pie: which is found in the Maritimes and western Canada and made with corn syrup,
- Shoofly pie: which is made with molasses and comes from the Pennsylvania Dutch community,
- Treacle tart: which is an English pastry made with golden syrup or treacle.

The earliest published Canadian recipe is from Barrie, Ontario, dating back to 1900 and can be found in The Women's Auxiliary of the Royal Victoria Hospital Cookbook, to which a chef by the name of Mrs. Mary Ethel MacLeod submitted the recipe for a butter tart filling. The original cookbook and recipe is housed at the Simcoe County Archives. Another early publication of a butter tart recipe was found in a 1915 pie cookbook. The food was an integral part of early Canadian cuisine and often viewed as a source of pride.

Similar tarts are made in Scotland, where they are often referred to as Ecclefechan butter tarts from the town of Ecclefechan. In France, they are related to the much more common tarte à la frangipane, that differs from the basic Canadian recipe only by the addition of ground almonds.

== Cultural identity ==
Butter tarts are an integral part of Central Canadian cuisine and are objects of cultural pride of many communities across Ontario and other provinces in central Canada. This cultural and community connection with the tart has spawned butter tart themed tourism such as "Ontario's Best Butter Tart Festival" in Midland, Ontario, the Butter Tart festival at Muskoka Lakes, Ontario, the trademarked "Butter Tart Trail" at Wellington North, Ontario, and the "Butter Tart Tour" in Kawarthas Northumberland, Ontario. The two competing associations have since resolved their dispute, called "The Butter Tart Wars" by Canadian Living, through the mutual agreement to modify "The Butter Tart Tour" to "Kawarthas Northumberland Butter Tart Tour". The first Kawarthas Northumberland Butter Tart Tour Taste-Off was launched at the Flavour Festival in Peterborough on Sunday, April 28, 2013, where four bakeries were crowned winners by a panel of celebrity judges.

Ontario's Best Butter Tart Festival and Contest is an annual event held in Midland, Ontario drawing over 60,000 attendees for the one day event. The contest portion of the festival attracts bakers from across Ontario, and is Canada's largest butter tart–themed celebration, with over 50,000 tarts sold in the festival market in 2014, and has grown to over 300,000 tarts sold in 2025.

National Geographic recognized the significance of the butter tart in an article on Georgian Bay, Ontario. In October 2013, referring to a stand in Wasaga Beach, they stated that "It's the homemade Canadian butter tarts – flaky crust with gooey pecan filling – that set this place apart from other lakeside ice cream stands."

The production of butter tarts in Canada slowed after a flood in Quebec, in April 2019, striking a major production centre. Global News reported the Vachon bakery in Sainte-Marie-de-Beauce had to be evacuated after a long-term flood. In July, Global News reported the bakery was slowly getting back to speed.

As part of the "Sweet Canada" series, a commemorative postage stamp was issued by Canada Post in April 2019 to celebrate the butter tart and a commemorative plaque was bestowed upon "Ontario's Best Butter Tart Festival" in Midland to acknowledge the original and largest festival of its kind.

The Canadian alternative rock band Len referenced butter tarts on their 1999 international hit "Steal My Sunshine", which confused some non Canadian listeners.

== See also ==
- List of butter dishes
- List of pies, tarts and flans
- Canadian cuisine
- List of Canadian inventions and discoveries
