= Crostata =

Italian baked tart or pie

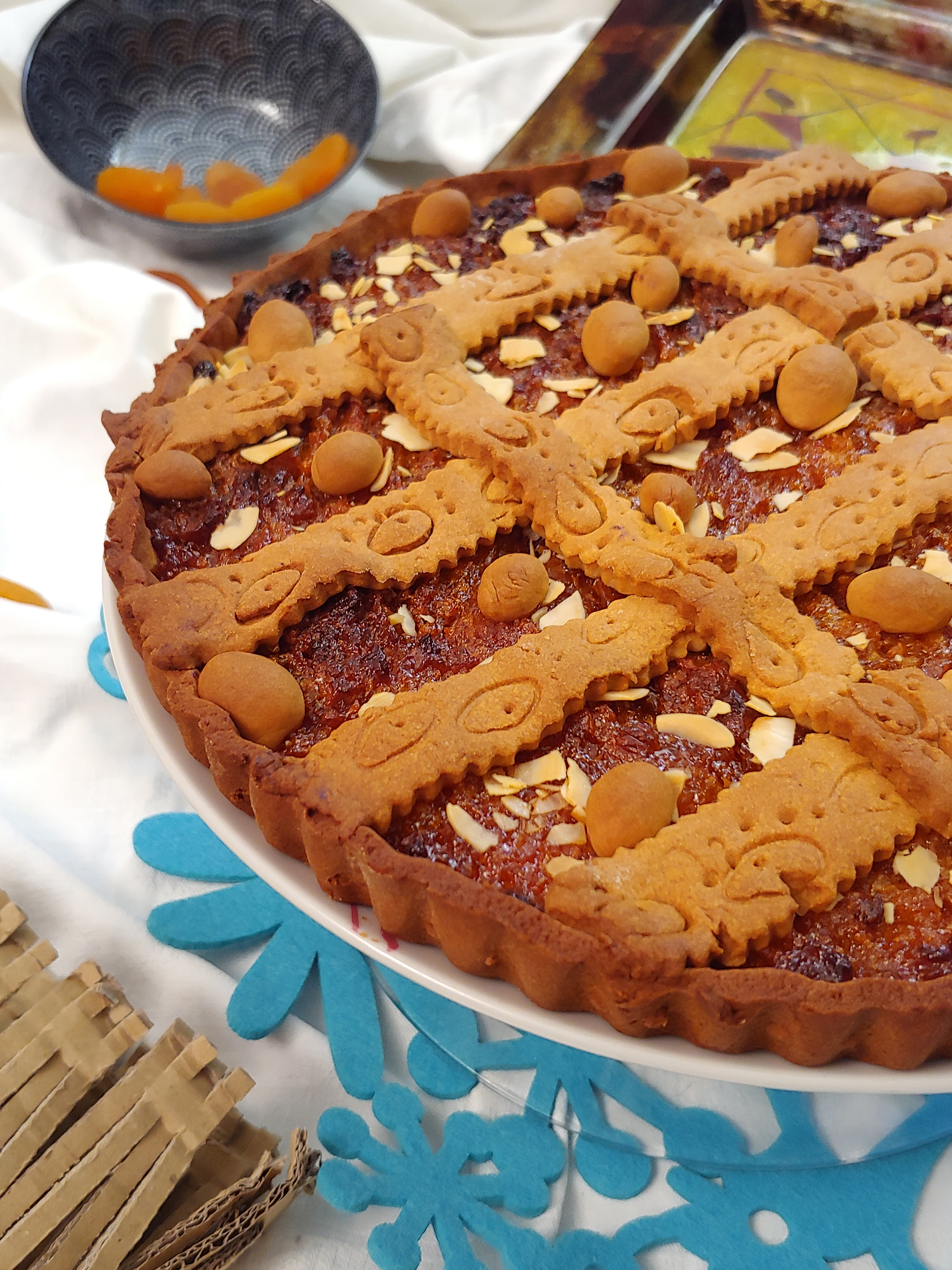
- Crostata with honey and apricots
- Type: Tart
- Course: Dessert
- Place of origin: Italy
- Main ingredients: Pastry crust, jam or ricotta cheese, fruit
- Variations: Crostata alla marmellata, crostata alla marmellata di albicocche, crostata alla Nutella, crostata di frutta, crostata di ricotta, many other sweet or savoury variations

Crostata (Italian: [kroˈstaːta]) is an Italian baked tart or pie. The earliest known use of crostata in its modern sense can be traced to the cookbooks Libro de Arte Coquinaria (Book of the Art of Cooking) by Martino da Como, published c. 1465, and Cuoco napolitano (Neapolitan Cook), published in the late 15th century, containing a recipe (number 94) titled Crostata de Caso, Pane, etc..

Crostata is a "rustic free-form version of an open fruit tart" that may also be baked in a pie plate.

Historically, it also referred to an "open-faced sandwich or canapé" because of its crusted appearance, or a chewet, a type of meat pie.

== Etymology ==
The name derives from the Latin word crustāta, the feminine past participle of crustāre ('to encrust'), and ultimately from the noun crusta ('crust'). The French term croustade derives from it, from which the English term custard derives. The word crostata appeared in the earliest Italian dictionaries, included in the 1612 dictionary Vocabolario degli Accademici della Crusca (compiled from 1591 to 1608) by the Accademia della Crusca and the Scuola Normale Superiore di Pisa, and the 1617 dictionary Il memoriale della lingua italiana: ridotto in ordine d'alfabeto per commodità del lettore by Giacomo Pergamino, in which it was defined as a type of torta.

== Description ==
Traditionally, crostata consisted of a base, usually three layers, of friable dough "flavoured with clarified fat and butter". Today, shortcrust pastry is used instead. It is differentiated from a torta by its filling: crostata has an inconsistent chunky filling, whereas a torta has a consistent filling made of blended ingredients.

Crostata can be blind-baked, filled with pastry cream (crema pasticciera), and then topped with pieces of fresh fruit; this is called crostata di frutta. In his 1570 cookbook Opera dell'arte del cucinare, Bartolomeo Scappi included a recipe for a crostata of plums and sour cherries, and others for quince and pears. A modern version is crostata alla nutella, which has Nutella as the filling.

Ingredients for a savoury crostata may include meat, fish or vegetables, which are pre-cooked. Opera dell'arte del cucinare included a recipe for a "crostata of crabmeat and shrimp", and also stated that to instead make a torta, the shrimp and crab should be crushed. A popular sweet variant, especially in central and south Italy, is crostata di ricotta, made with ricotta cheese mixed with sugar and lemon zest, and which may additionally include cocoa or raisins.

Scappi included many recipes for crostata in Opera dell'arte del cucinare. For meat and seafood based crostata, there were recipes using pork jowls or prosciutto, crayfish, anchovies or oysters. Other savoury crostata recipes included a crostata with creamy cheese referred to as a butirata, those with truffles or field mushrooms, one with artichoke or cardoon hearts, and one with "the viscera of any sort of turtle".

== See also ==
Media related to Crostata at Wikimedia Commons

- List of Italian desserts and pastries
- Pastafrola – a version found in Greece, Egypt, and South America
- Linzertorte – a similar Austrian dish
