= Tarte au sucre =

Dessert

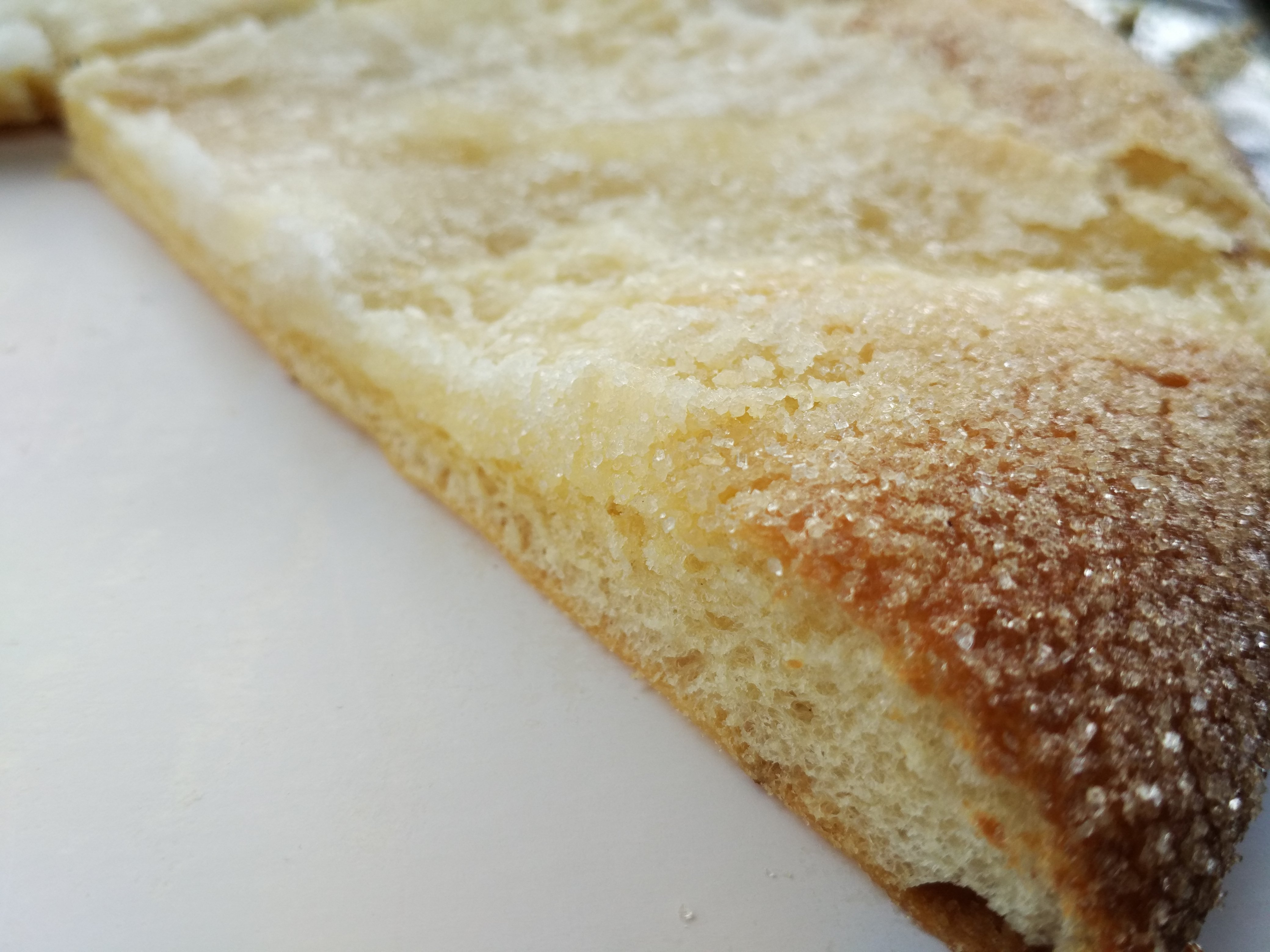
- Tarte au sucre from northern France
- Alternative names: Sugar pie, sugar cream pie, finger pie
- Type: Pie
- Main ingredients: Flour, butter, sugar

Tarte au sucre (sugar pie) is a dessert from northern French and Belgian cuisine, which is also popular in Canada.

Various type of tarte au sucre are made. Some are a leavened dough topped with beet sugar or brown sugar, while others are made with a shortcrust pastry. The French Canadian version of the dessert sometimes uses maple syrup.

== Canada ==
In Canada, the sugar pie is considered a classic dish of Québécois cuisine. In 2019, the sugar pie was featured on a Canadian postage stamp.
