= Tart =

Open-topped pastry dish

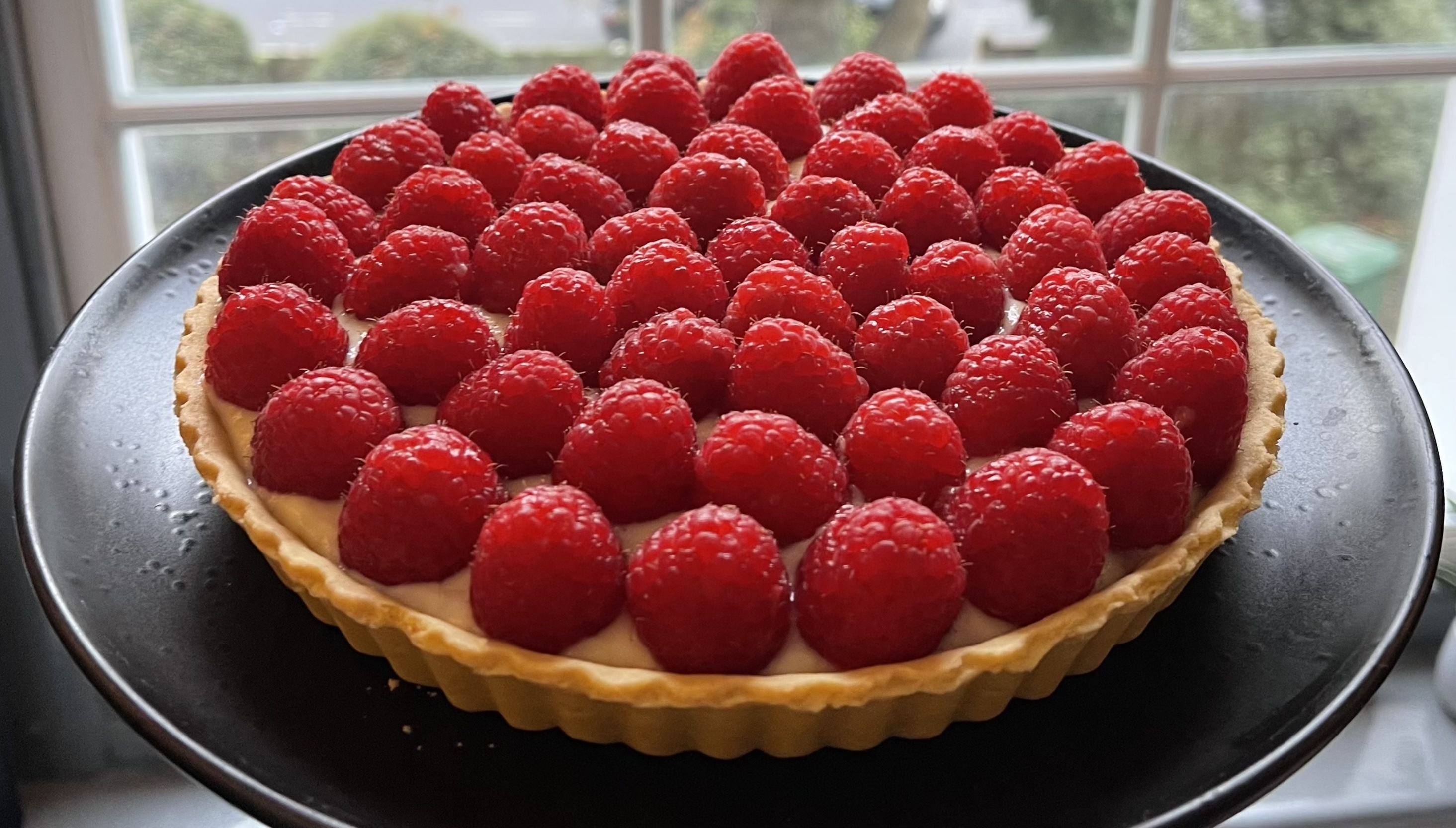
- Raspberry tart
- Main ingredients: Pastry crust (usually shortcrust pastry)
- Variations: Sweet tarts, savoury tarts

A tart is a baked dish consisting of a filling over a pastry base with an open top not covered with pastry. The pastry is usually shortcrust pastry; the filling may be sweet or savoury, though modern tarts are usually fruit-based, sometimes with custard. Tartlet refers to a miniature tart; an example would be egg tarts. The categories of "tart", "flan", and "pie" overlap, with no sharp distinctions.

== History ==
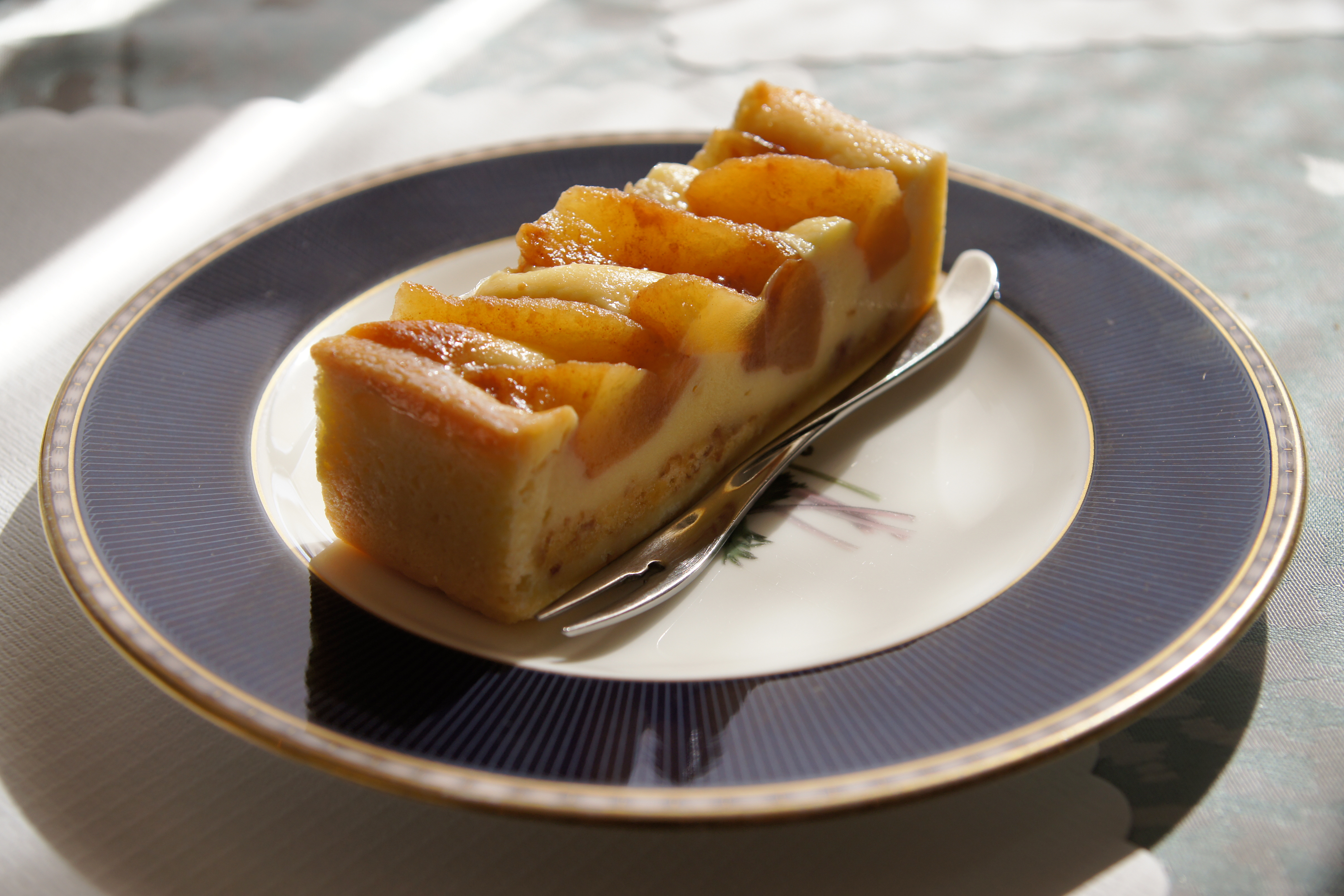
Piece of apple tart

The French word tarte can be translated to mean either pie or tart, as both are mainly the same except a pie usually covers the filling in pastry, while flans and tarts leave it open.

Tarts are thought to have either come from a tradition of layering food or to be a product of medieval pie making. Enriched dough (i.e. shortcrust) is thought to have been first commonly used in 1550, approximately 200 years after pies. In this period, they were viewed as high-cuisine, popular with nobility, in contrast to the view of a commoner's pie. While originally savory, with meat fillings, culinary tastes led to sweet tarts prevailing, filling tarts instead with fruit and custard. Early medieval tarts generally had meat fillings, but later ones were often based on fruit and custard.

An early tart was the Italian crostata, dating to at least the mid-15th century. It has been described as a "rustic free-form version of an open fruit tart".

== Description ==
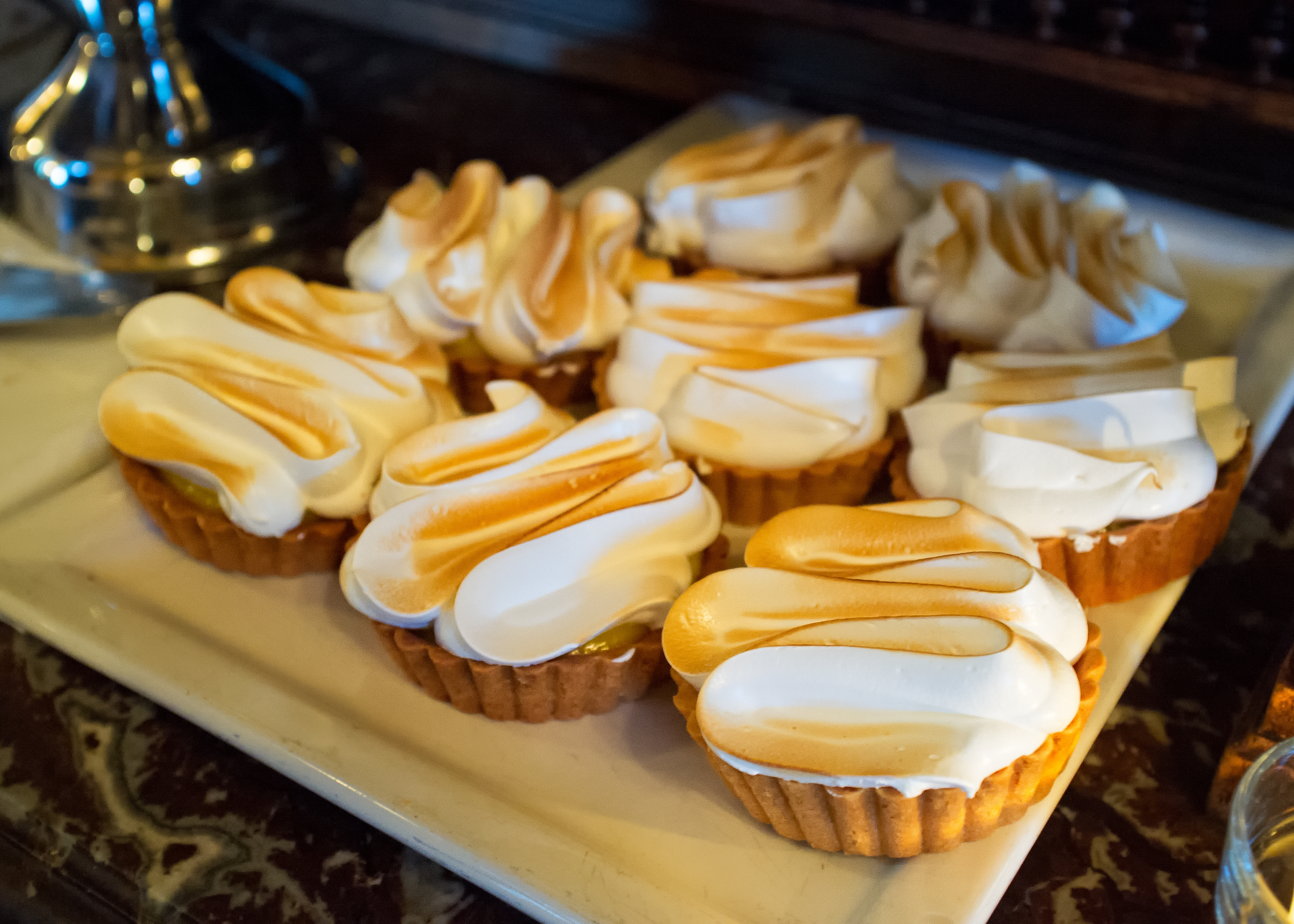
Lemon meringue tarts

Tarts are typically free-standing with firm pastry base consisting of dough, itself made of flour, thick filling, and perpendicular sides while pies may have softer pastry, looser filling, and sloped sides, necessitating service from the pie plate.

== Varieties ==
There are many types of tarts, with popular varieties including Treacle tart, meringue tart, tarte tatin and Bakewell tart. A jam tart uses jam in place of fresh fruit.

Tarte Tatin is an upside-down tart, of apples, other fruit, or onions.

Savoury tarts include quiche, a family of savoury tarts with a mostly custard filling; Italian Crostata, German Zwiebelkuchen and Alsace Tarte à l'oignon or Zewelwaï (onion tarts), and Swiss cheese tart made from Gruyère.

== Gallery ==
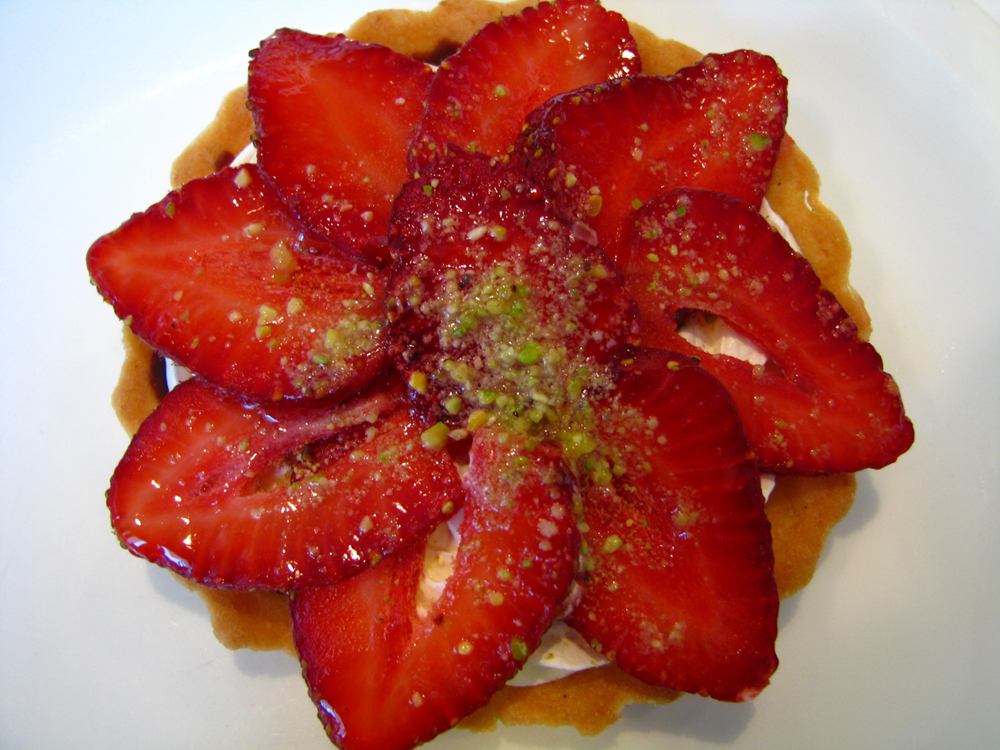
Strawberry tart

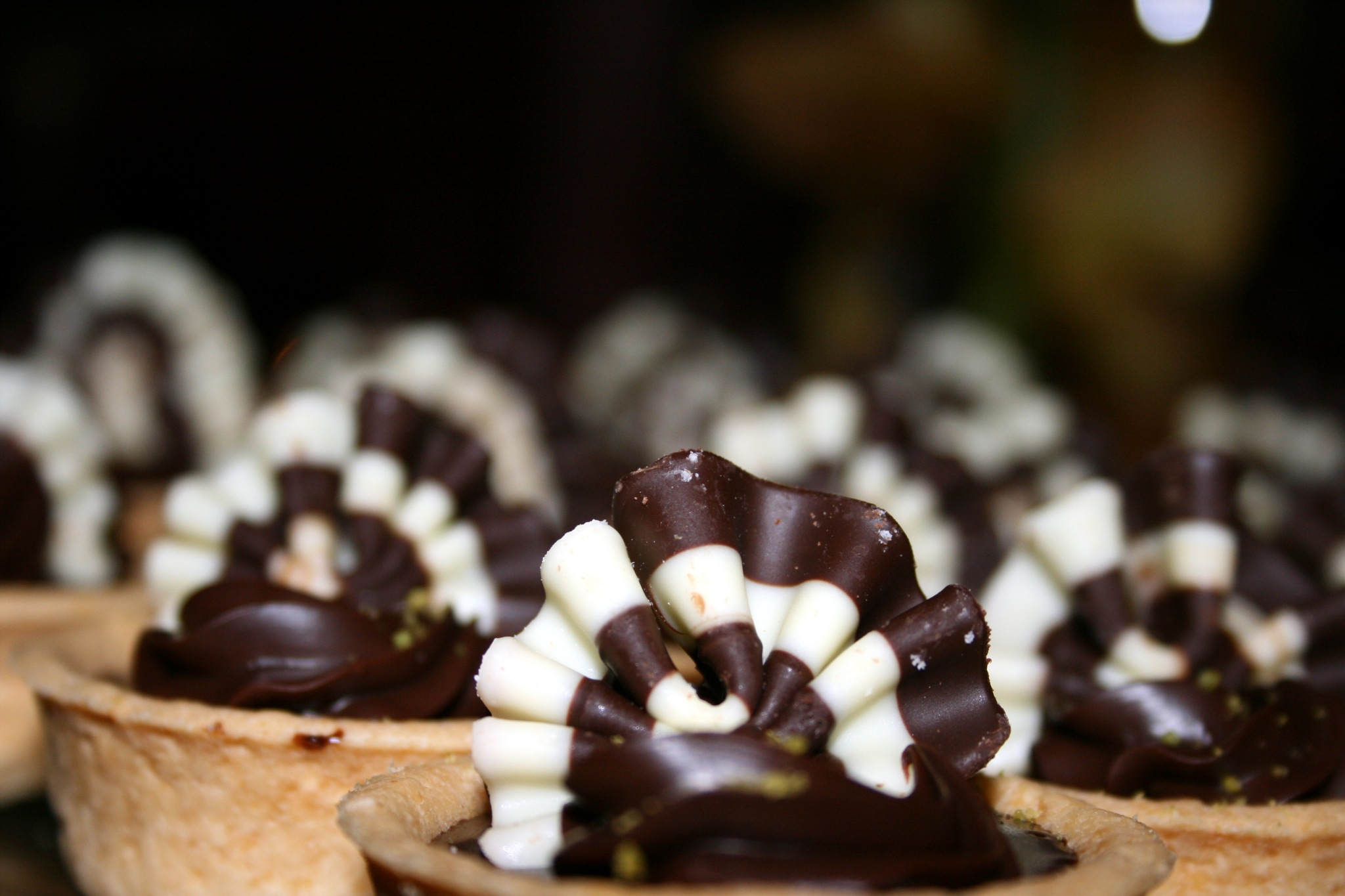
Chocolate tart

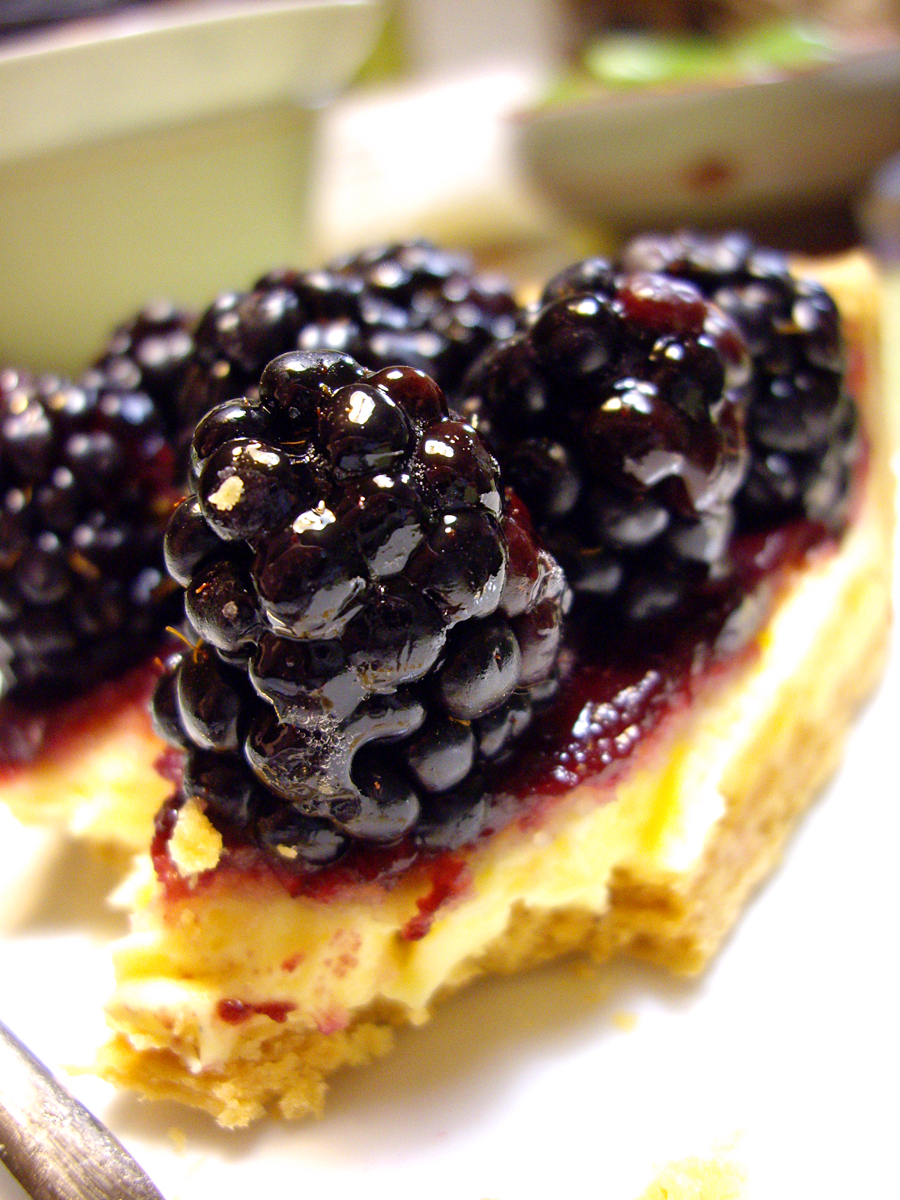
Mexican blackberry tart

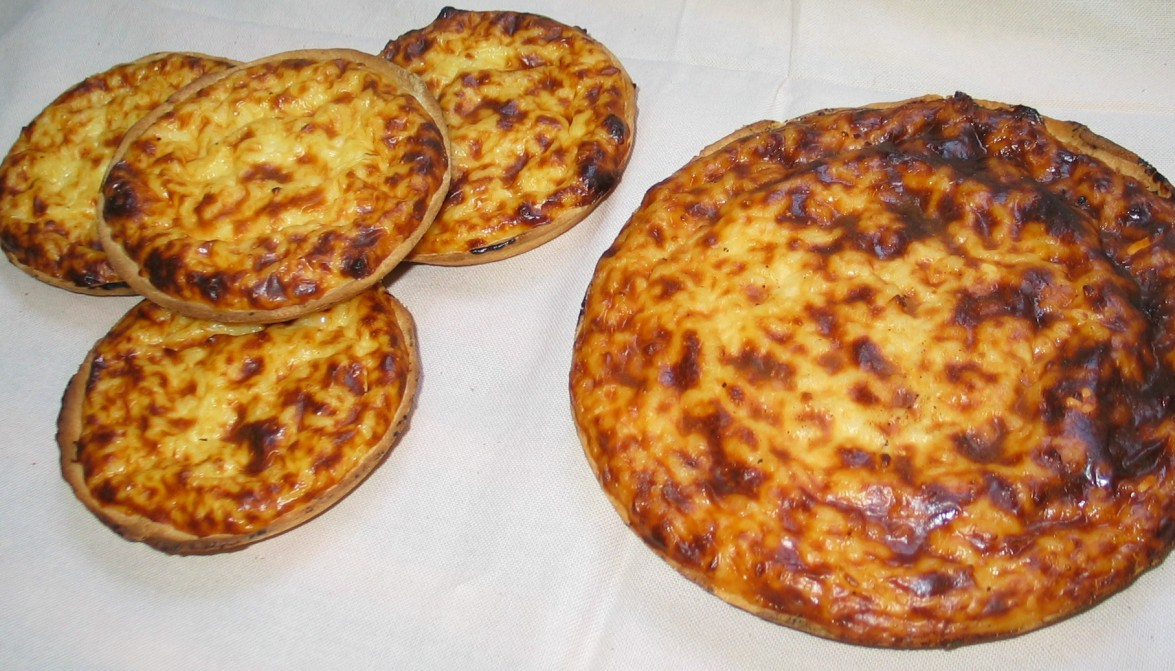
Rijstevlaai

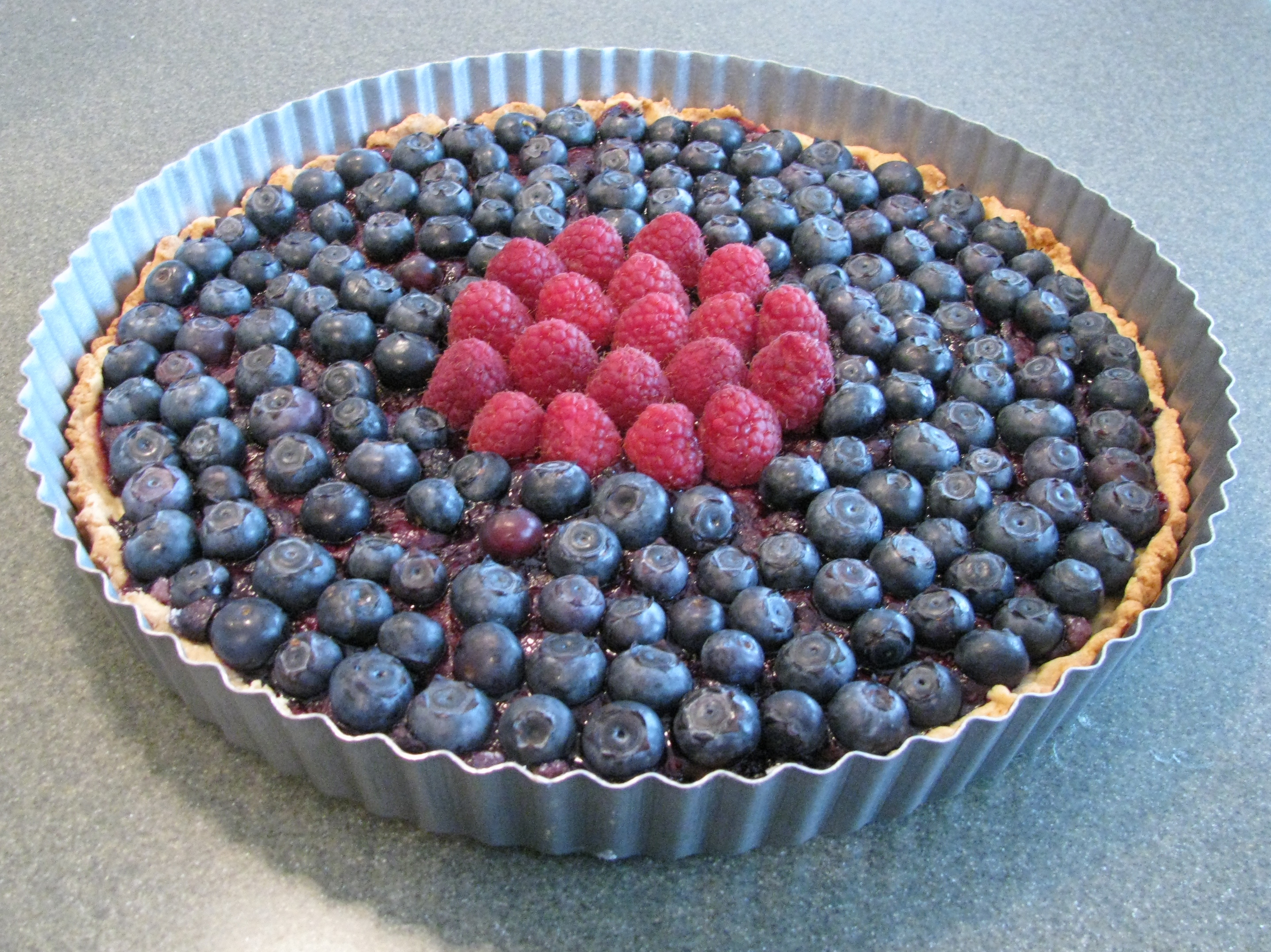
Blueberry and raspberry tart

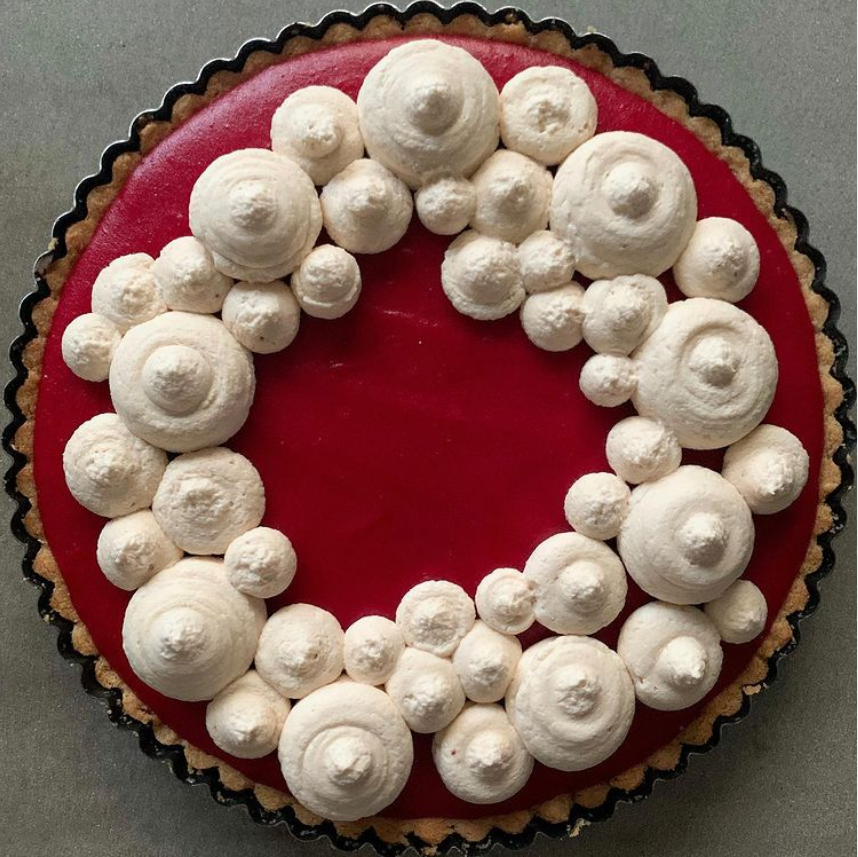
Cranberry curd tart

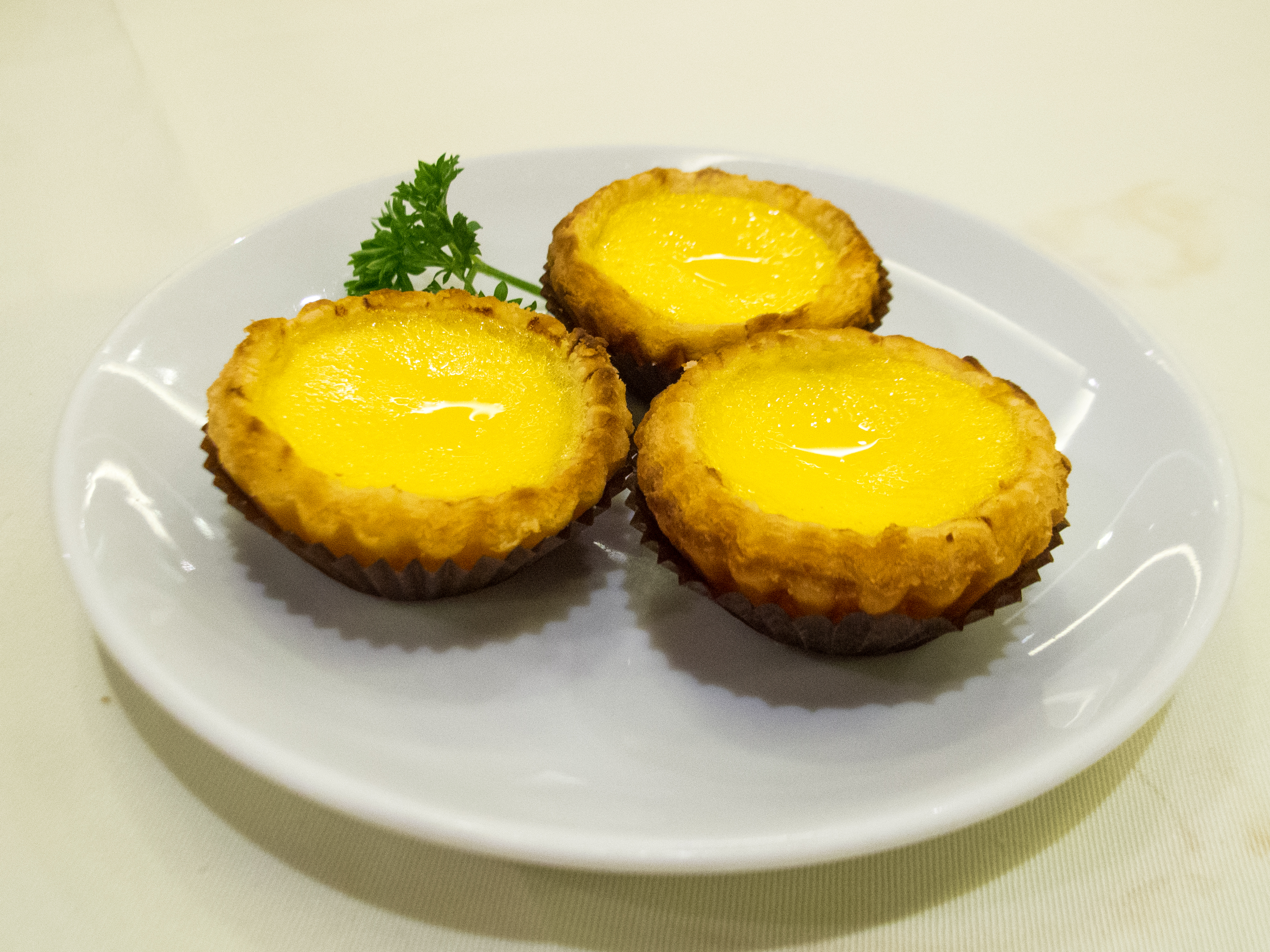
Egg tart

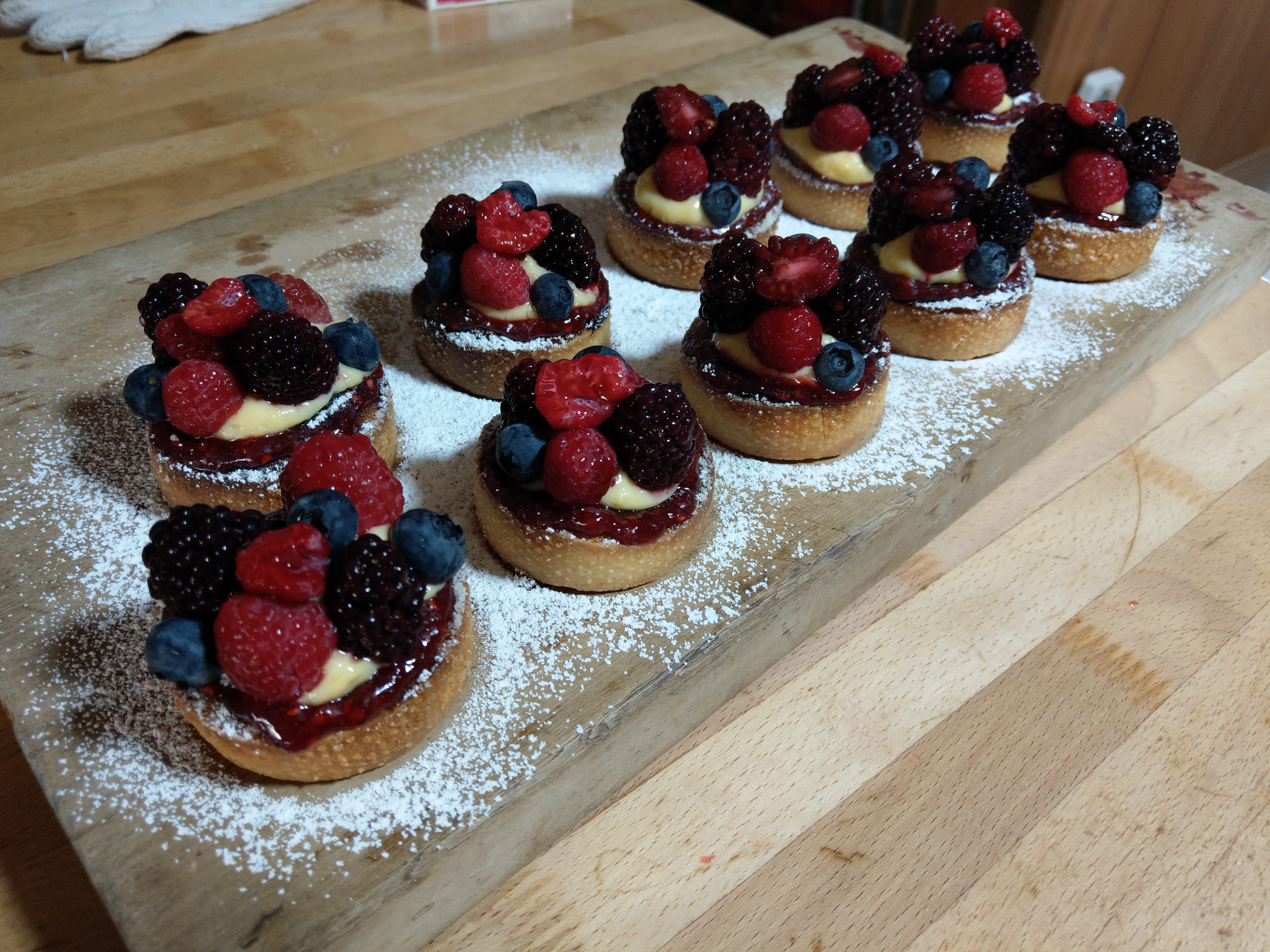
Tarte fruits rouges

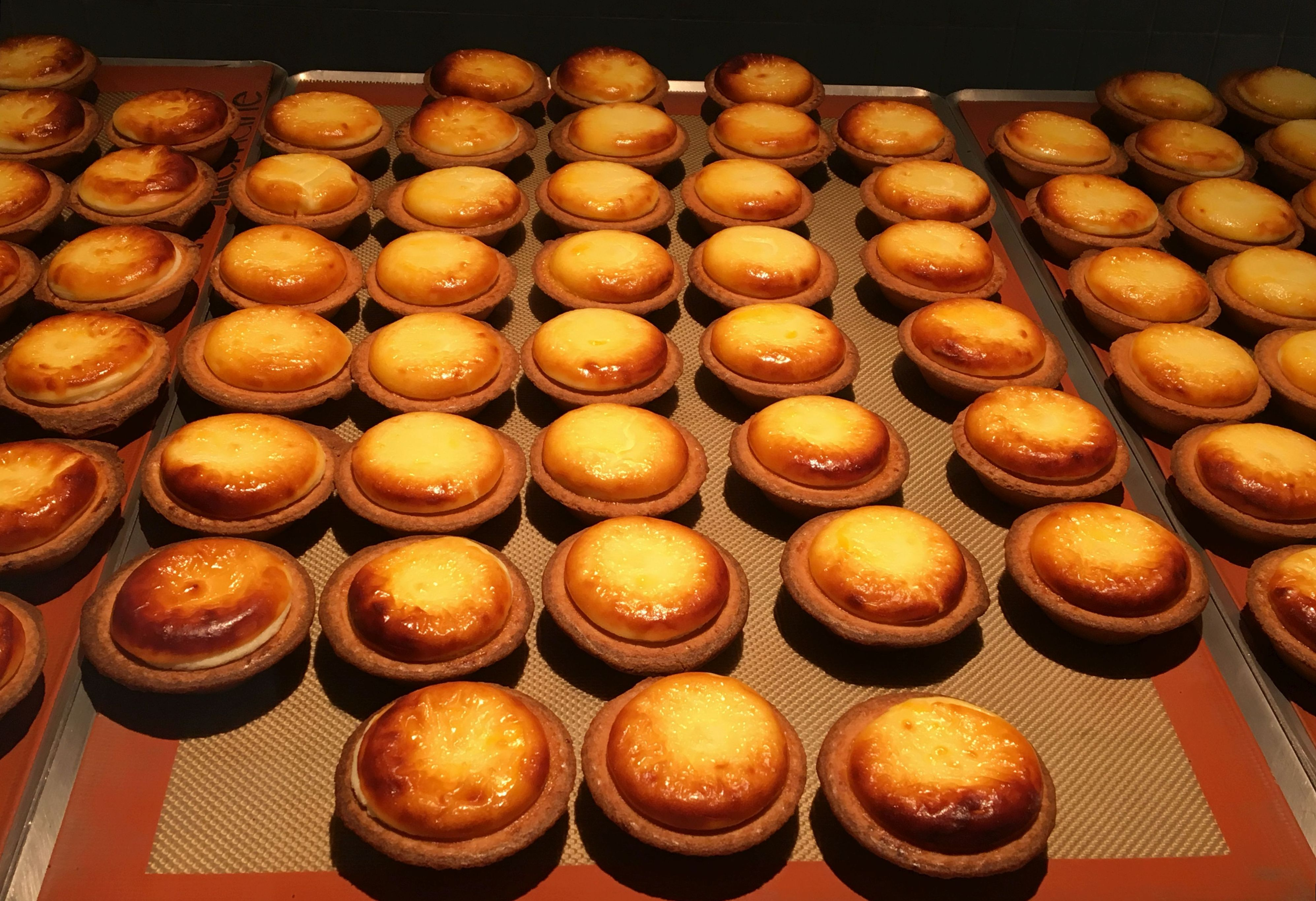
Hokkaido cheese tarts from Japan

== See also ==
- Butter tart
- Custard tart
- Gypsy tart
- Hertzoggie
- List of baked goods
- List of desserts
- List of pies, tarts and flans
- Manchester tart
- Neenish tart
- Norman tart
- Pop tart
- Treacle tart
- Vlaai
