= Shortcrust pastry =

Base used for a tart, quiche or pie

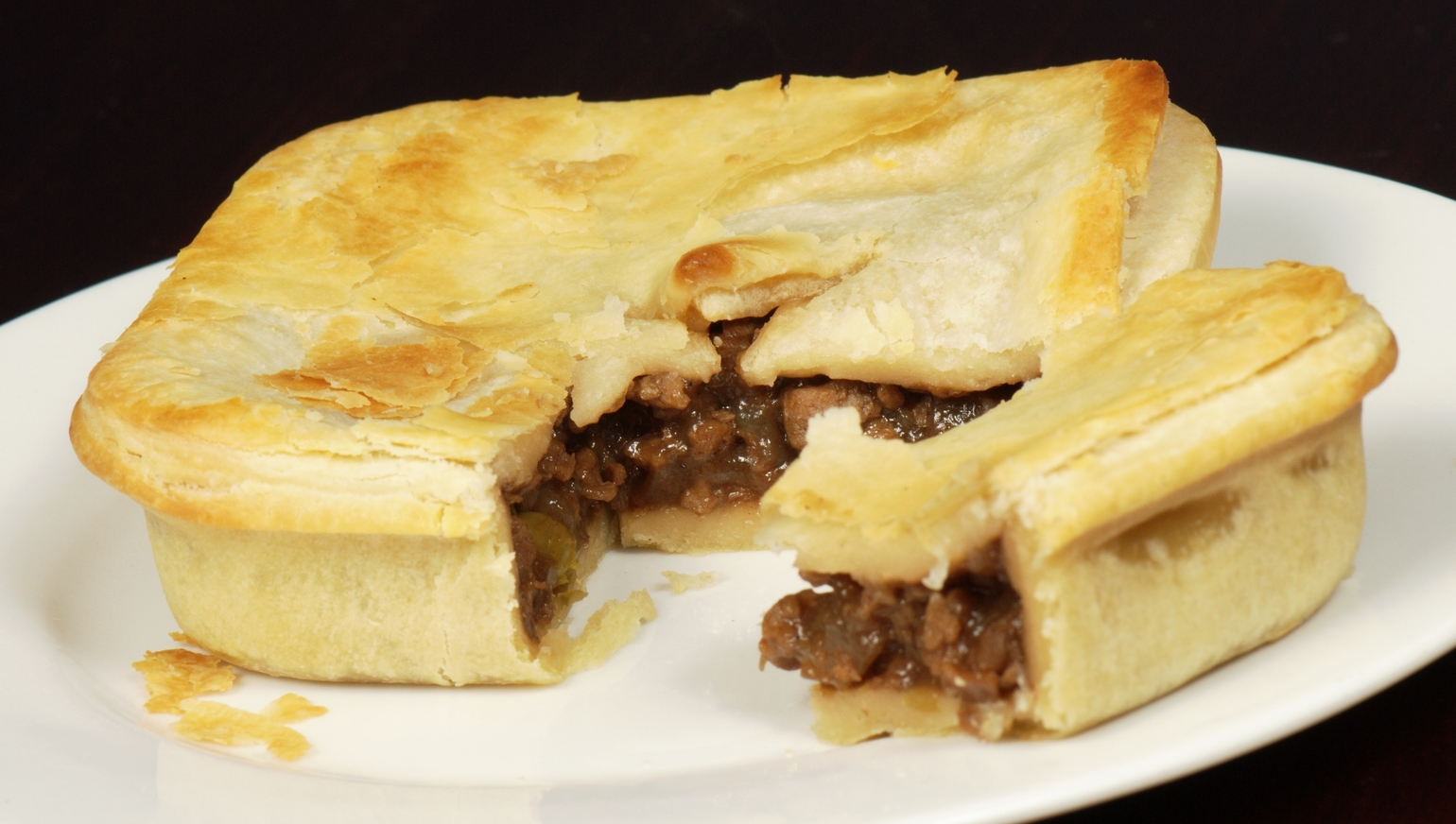
- A shortcrust pastry pie crust
- Type: Pastry
- Region or state: Western countries
- Main ingredients: Fat (lard, shortening, butter or full-fat margarine), flour, water

Shortcrust is a type of pastry often used for the base of a tart, quiche, pie, or (in the British English sense) flan. Shortcrust pastry can be used to make both sweet and savory pies such as apple pie, quiche, lemon meringue or chicken pie.

A sweetened version – using butter – is used in making spritz cookies.

Shortcrust pastry recipes usually call for twice as much flour as fat by weight. Fat (as lard, shortening, butter or traditional margarine) is rubbed into plain flour to create a loose mixture that is then bound using a small amount of ice water, rolled out, then shaped and placed to create the top or bottom of a pie. Often, equal amounts of butter and lard are used to make the pastry, ensuring that the combined weight of the two fat products is still half that of the flour. The butter is employed to give the pastry a rich flavor, while the lard ensures optimum texture.

== Types ==
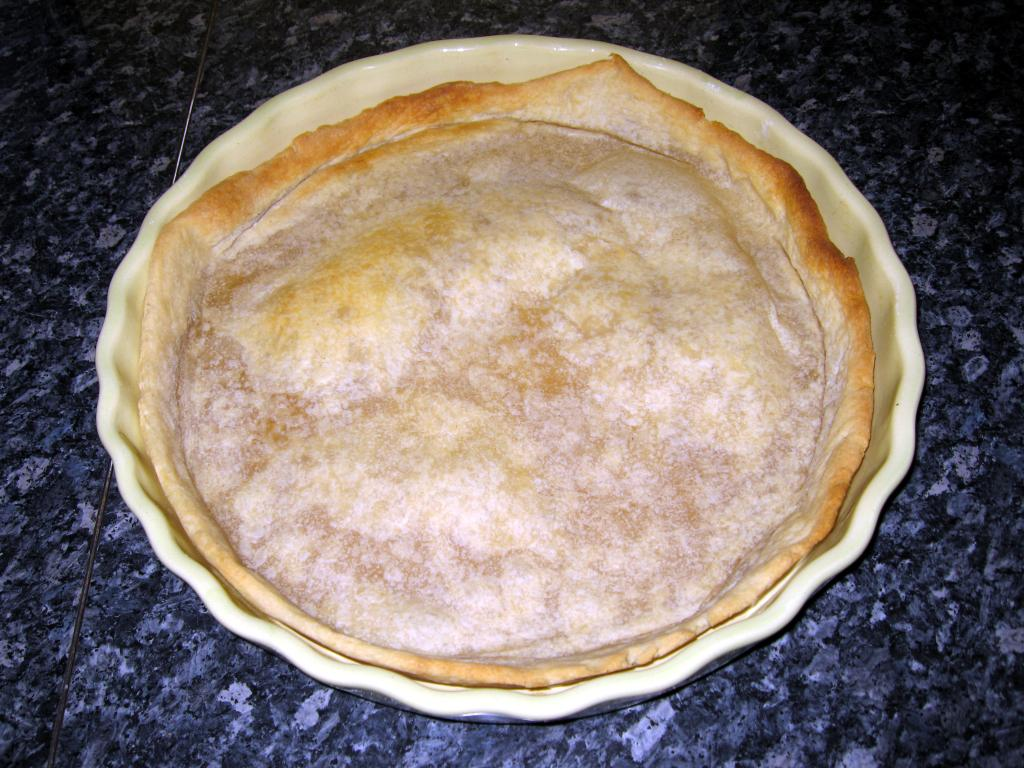
Pie made with pâte brisée

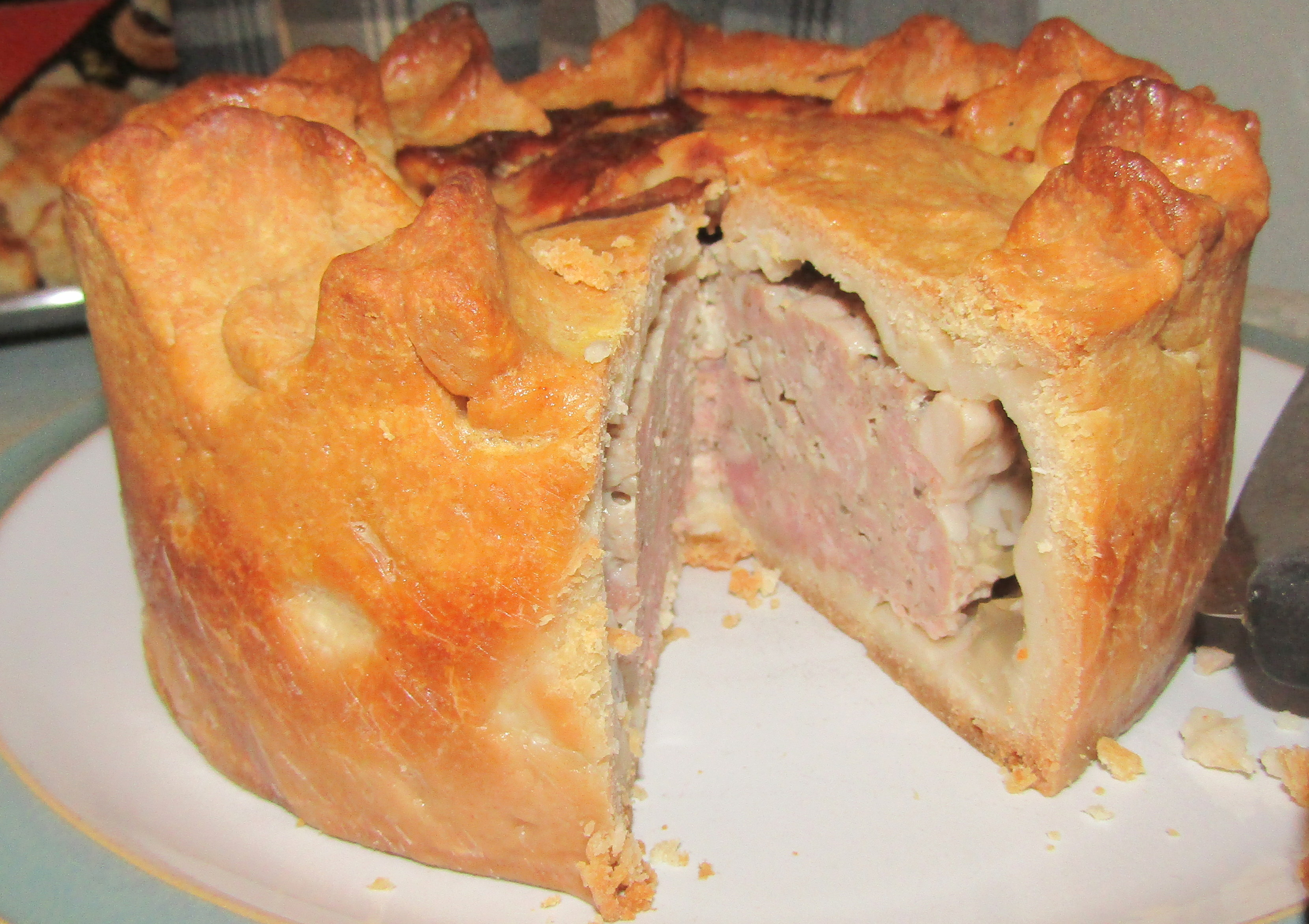
"Raised" pie

- Pâte à foncer is a French shortcrust pastry that includes egg. Egg and butter are worked together with a small quantity of sugar and salt before the flour is drawn into the mixture and cold water is added to bind it.
- Pâte brisée is similar to pâte à foncer, but is lighter and more delicate due to an increased quantity of butter – up to three-fifths the quantity of flour. Very often it is made with no sugar, as a savoury crust for pies. It is an unsweetened pastry used for raised pies with meat fillings and savory custard filled quiches like Quiche Lorraine. The name "pâte brisée" translates to "broken pastry" Pâte brisée is, according to the French-American Cultural Foundation, a classic of French pastry. Pâte brisée is made with flour, cold or softened butter, eggs, salt, and icewater. According to Marie-Antoine Carême pâte brisée was made by rubbing in the butter and folding the dough several times by hand on a pastry board. According to Carême, pâte brisée is "used particularly for gateaux des rois".
- Pâte sablée is made with more sugar, which sweetens the mix and impedes the gluten strands, creating a pastry that breaks up easily in the mouth. An alternative is a gluten-free pastry.
- Pâte sucrée has the same ingredients as pâte sablée, but the butter is creamed with the sugar and the eggs before the flour is folded in. This mixes the butter more evenly, which makes the dough puff much less, creating a more "snappy" and dry pastry, instead of the crumbly texture of the previous doughs. Alternatively, according to the Traite de Patisserie Moderne, if sugar is added to pâte brisée the dough is called pâte sucrée.

== Techniques ==
In preparing a shortcrust, the fat and flour are "cut" into each other, rather than blended, and the ingredients are kept cold. This ensures that the fat remains distinct in the crust, and when it heats during baking, steam is released, resulting in the pockets that make a flaky crust. Water is only added once the fat and flour are thoroughly combined. This ensures that the flour granules are adequately coated with fat and are less likely to develop gluten, which results in the crumbly or "short" texture. This may be achieved with the use of a food processor, a specialized kitchen utensil called a pastry blender, or through various alternatives, like a pair of table knives held in one hand, or smearing the flour and fat together using the heel of the hand in a method known as fraisage.

In addition to over-warming the dough, overworking it is also a hazard. Overworking elongates the gluten strands, creating a product that is tough, rather than light and crumbly or flaky. Flour made from low protein soft wheat, like cake flour, is used for pastry making because it does not become overworked and tough as easily as bread flour.

=== Decorative techniques ===
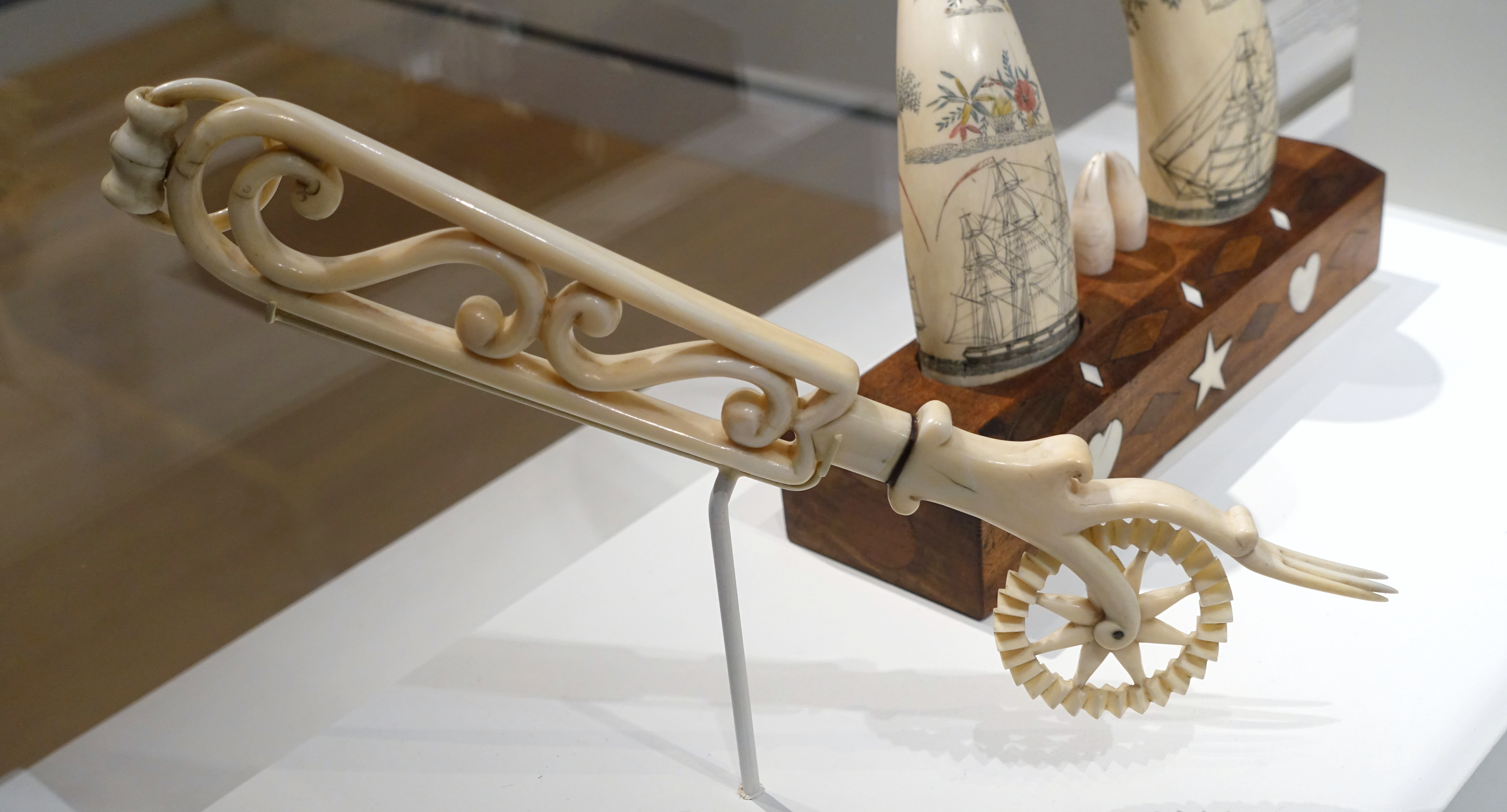
Pie crimper from the 1800s

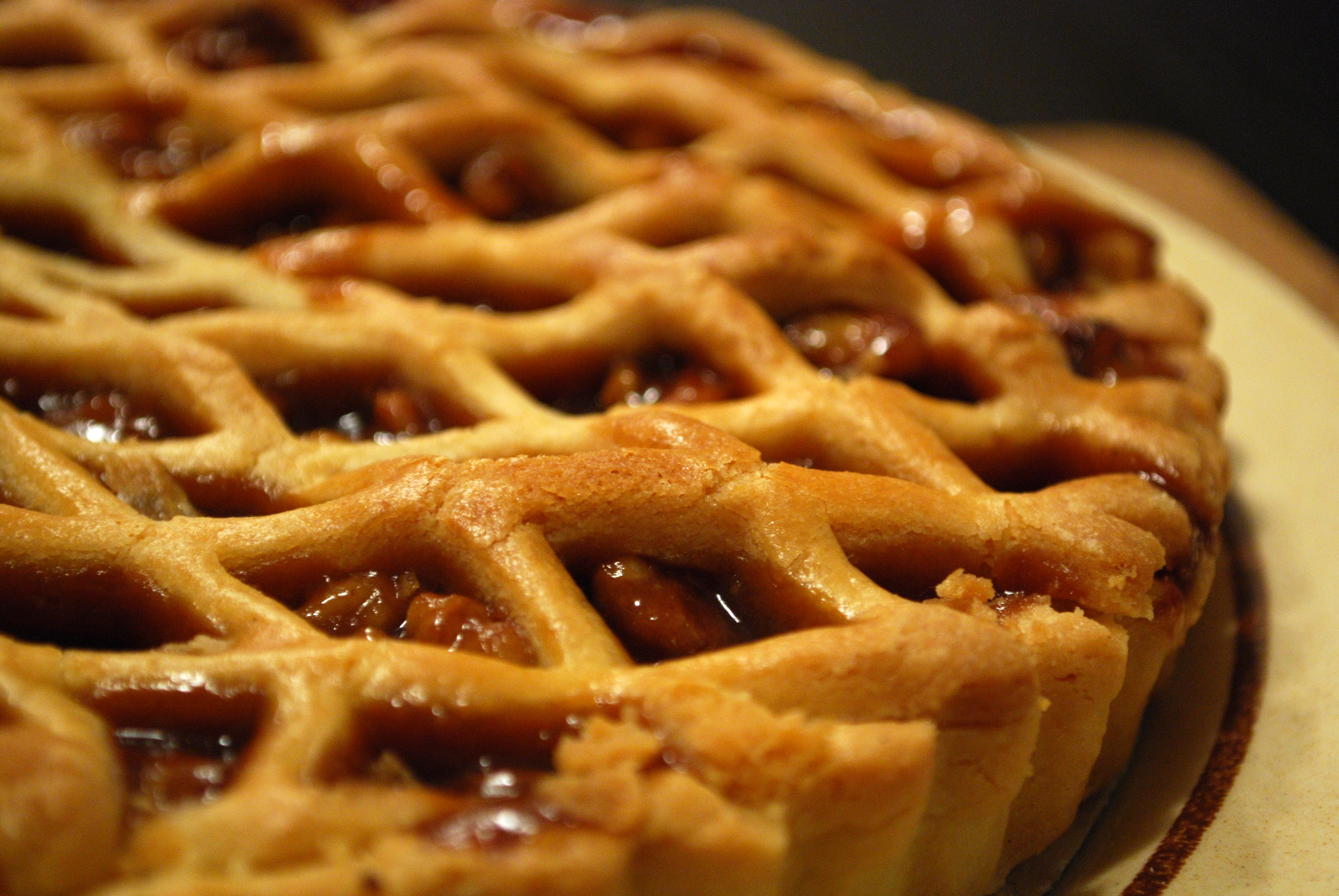
Closeup of peekaboo lattice

A pie crust edge is often crimped to provide visual interest, and in the case of a two-crust pie in order to seal the top and bottom crusts together to prevent the filling from leaking. Crimping can be done by hand, pinching the two crusts together to create a ruffled edge, or with a tool.

A pie's top crust is often pierced to allow steam to escape and to provide visual interest. Piercing can be done with a knife or by using one of several techniques such as latticing. Latticing involves interweaving strips of pastry. It can also be achieved by cutting horizontal rows of slits into a whole pie crust and pulling gently to open the slits, a technique known as a "peekaboo" lattice.

Latticing a piecrust
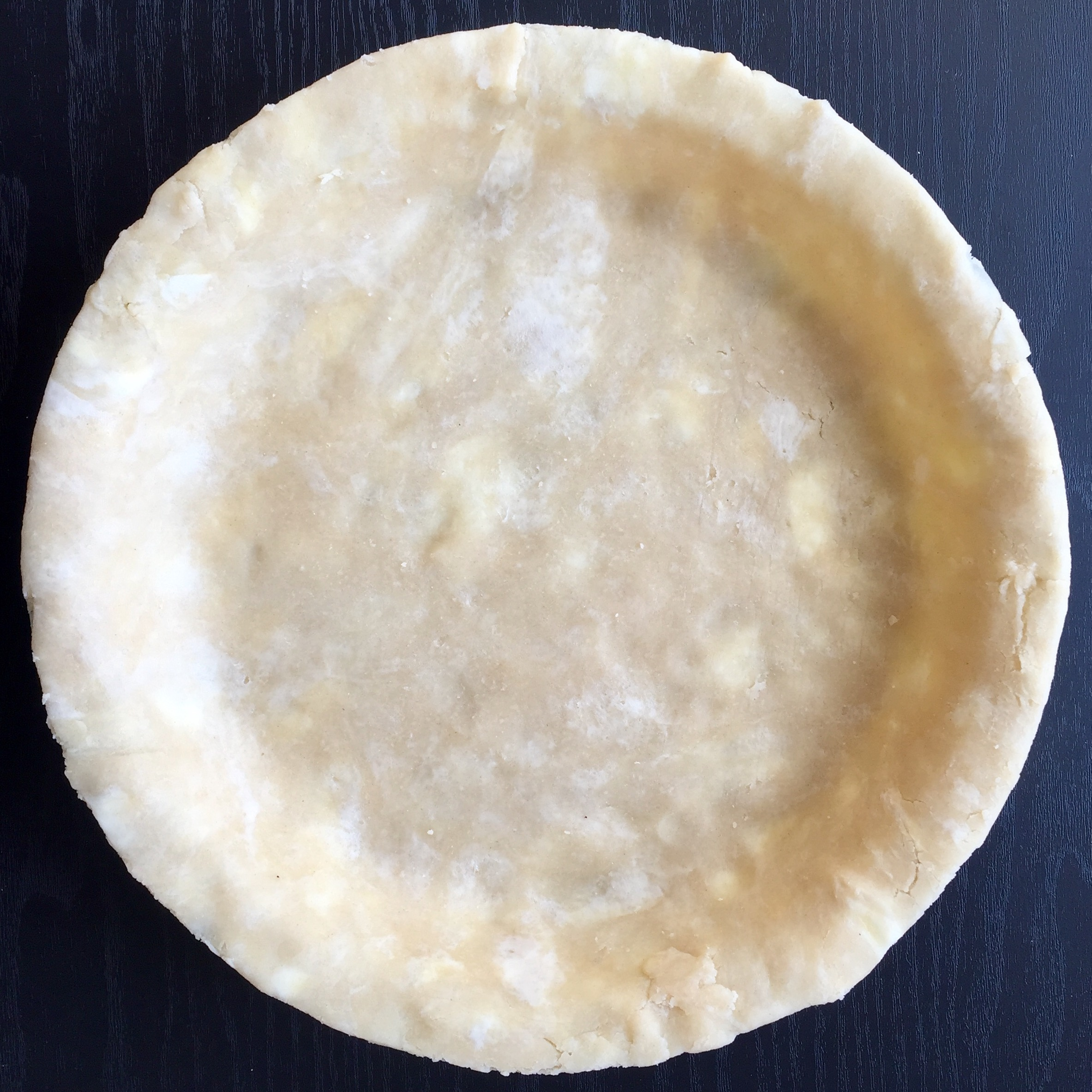
Bottom crust

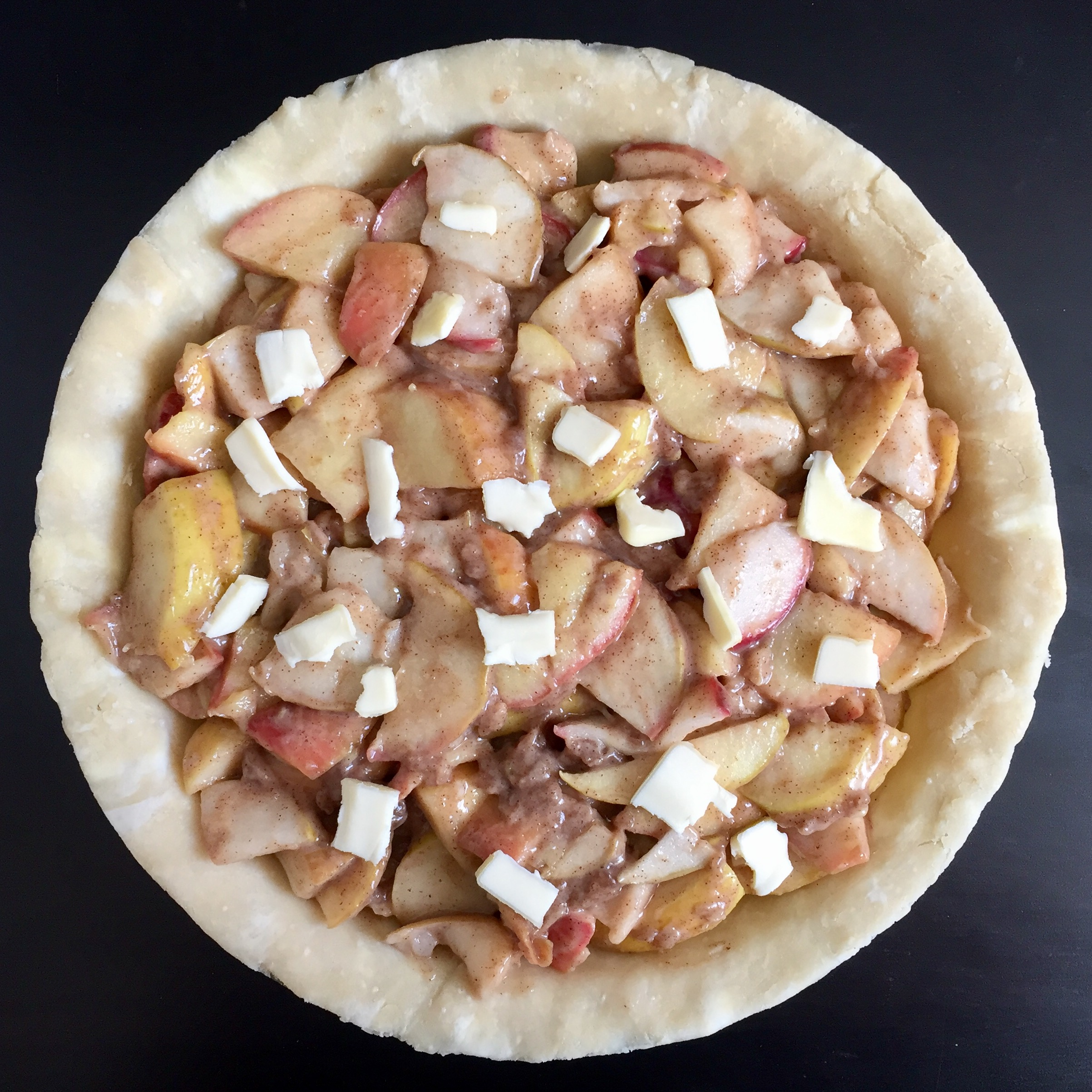
Filled crust

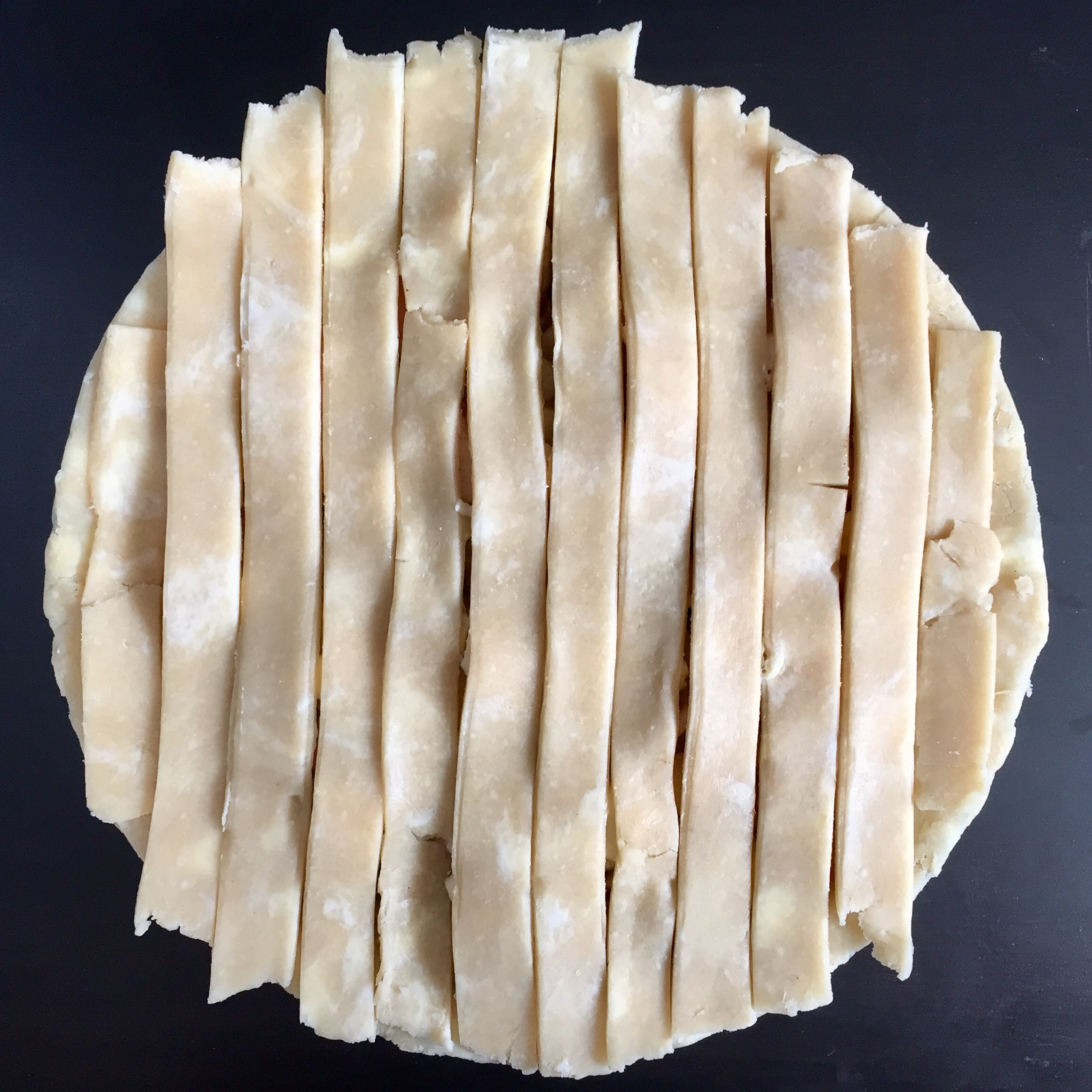
Starting latticework

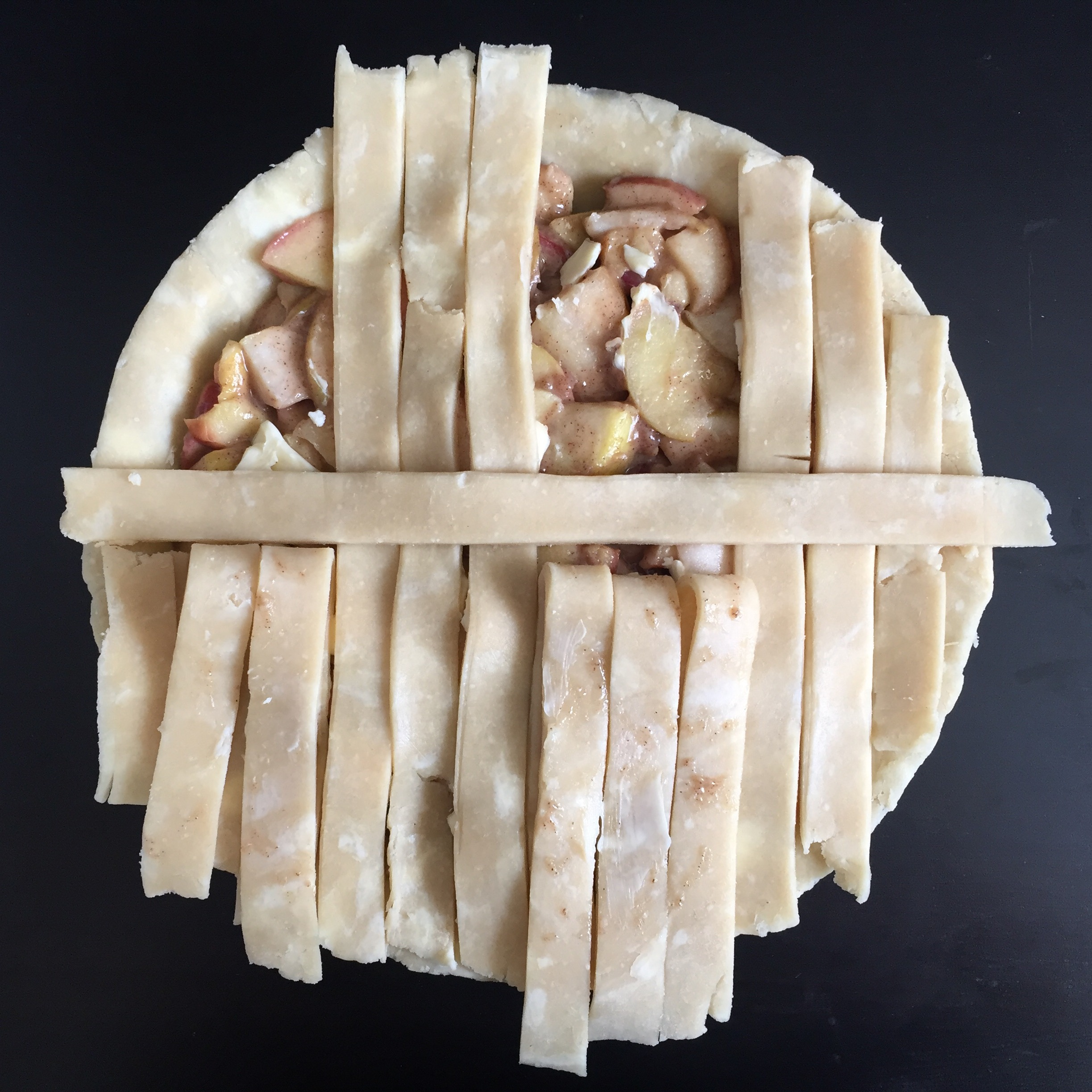
Latticing

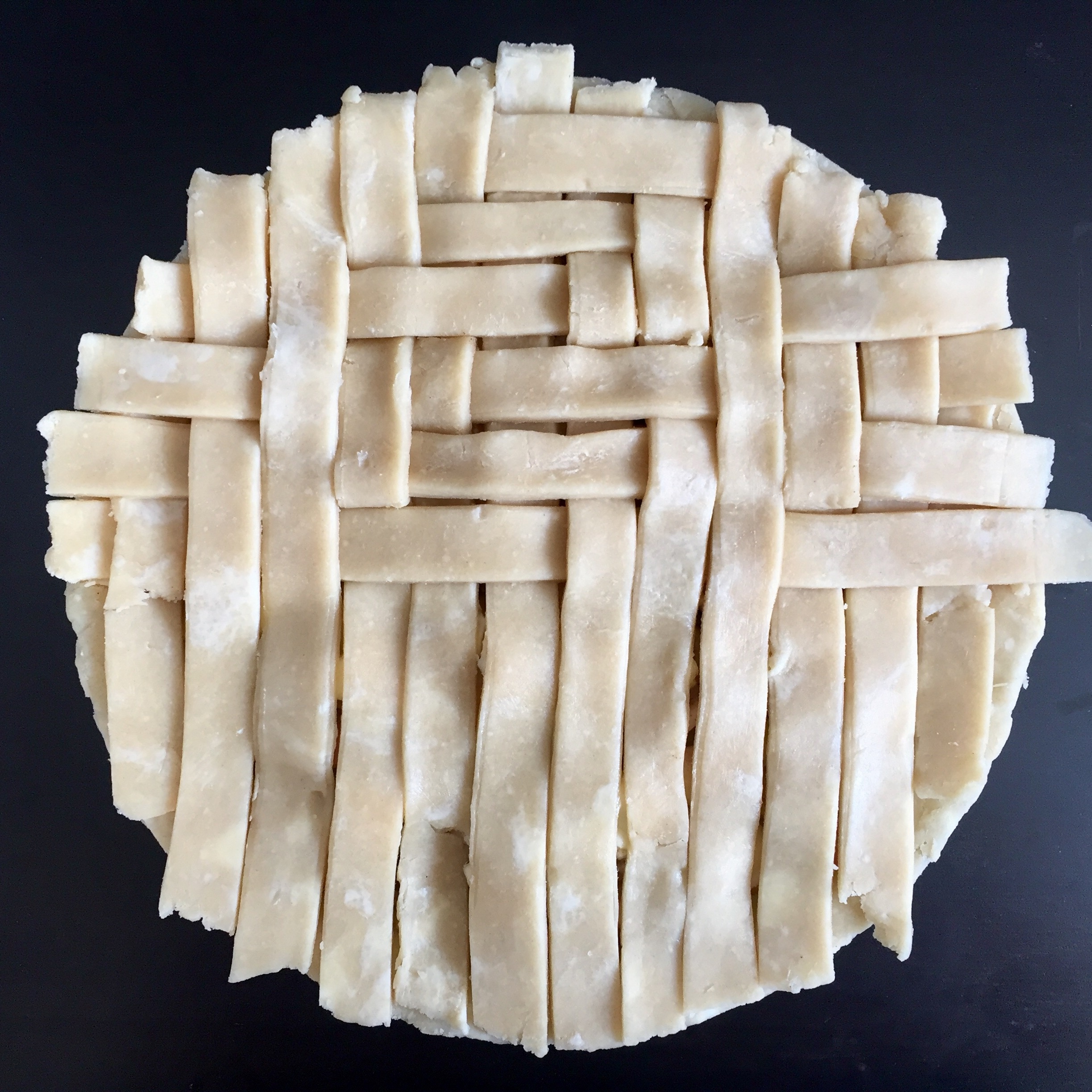
Latticing continues in a herringbone pattern

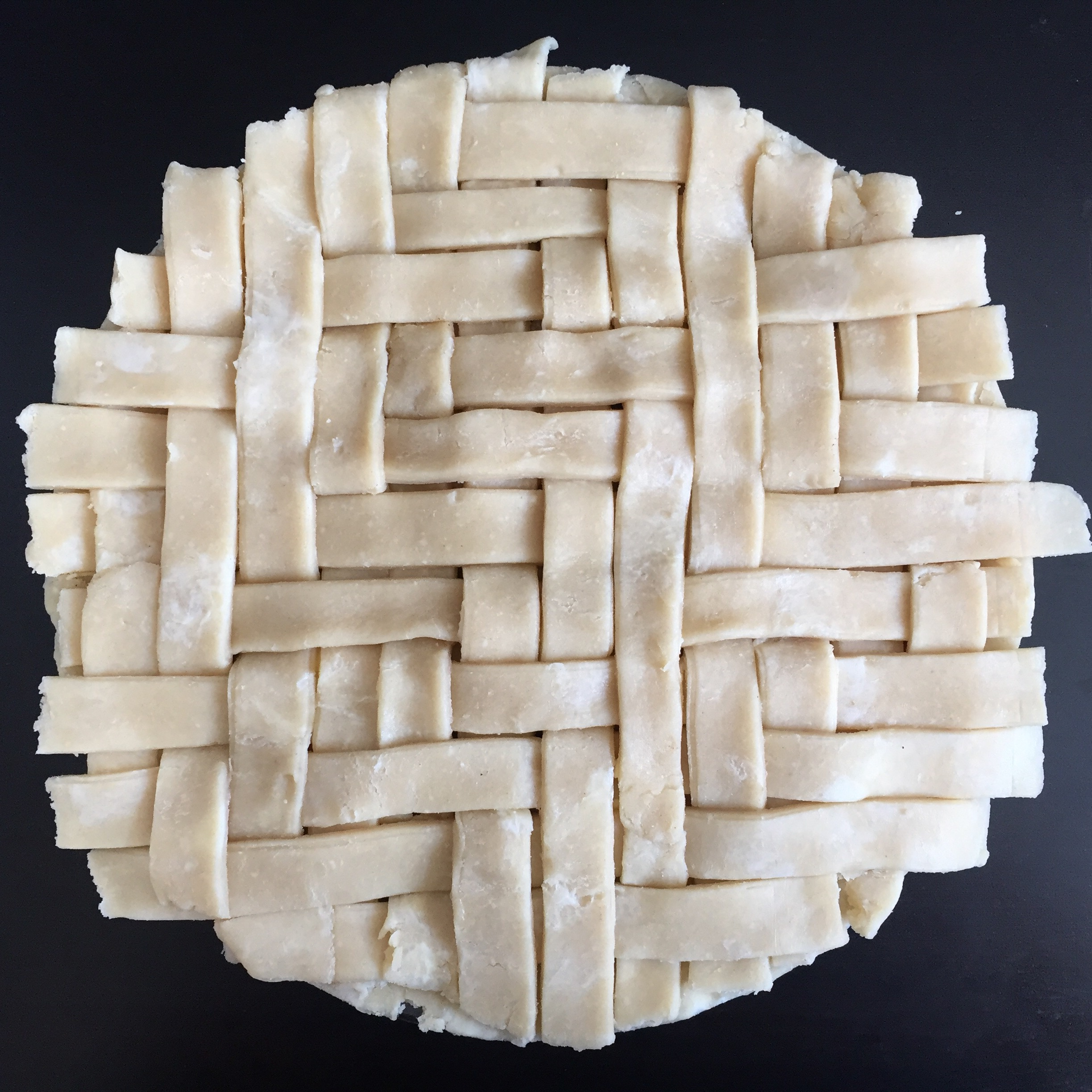
Latticing finished

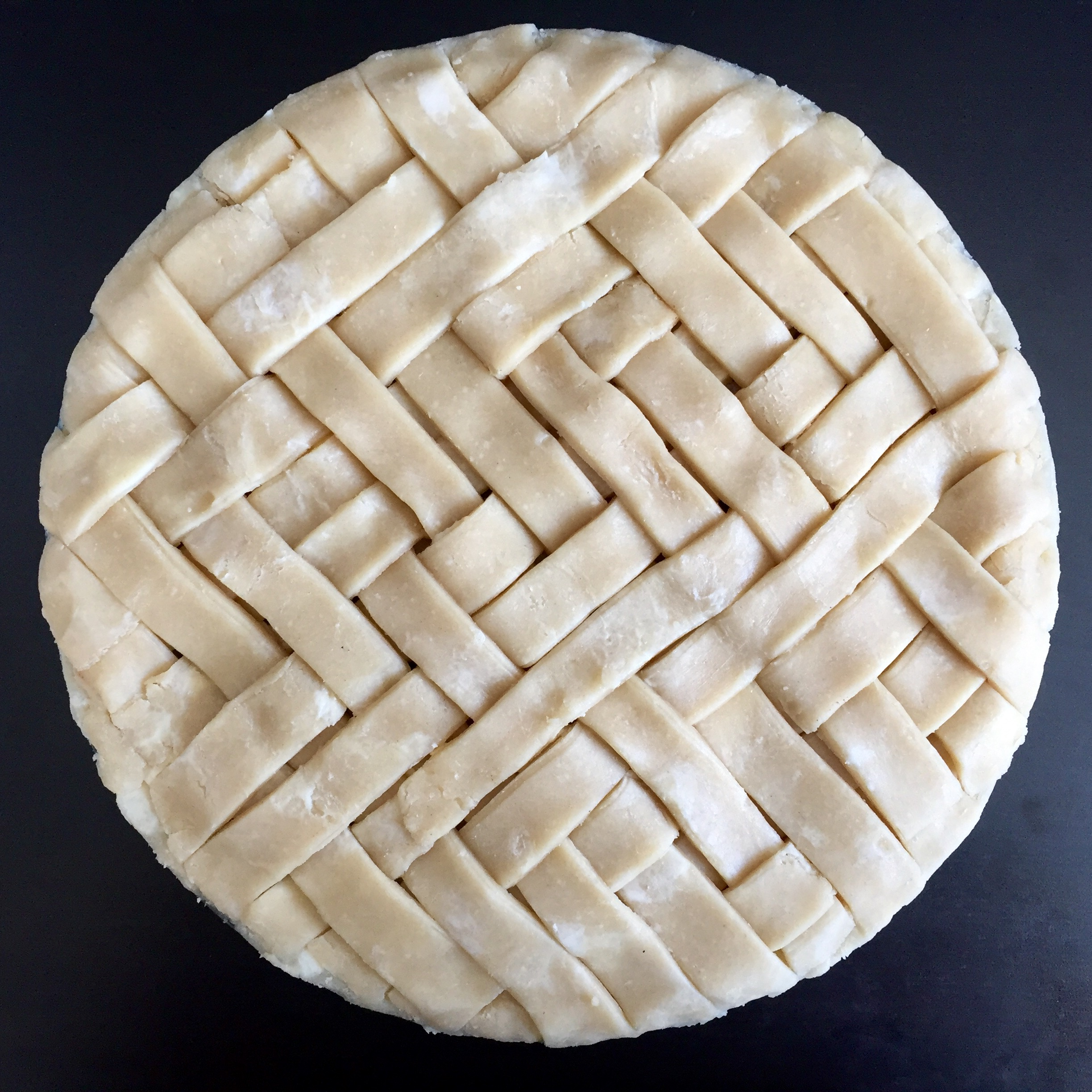
Crimped crust, ready for baking

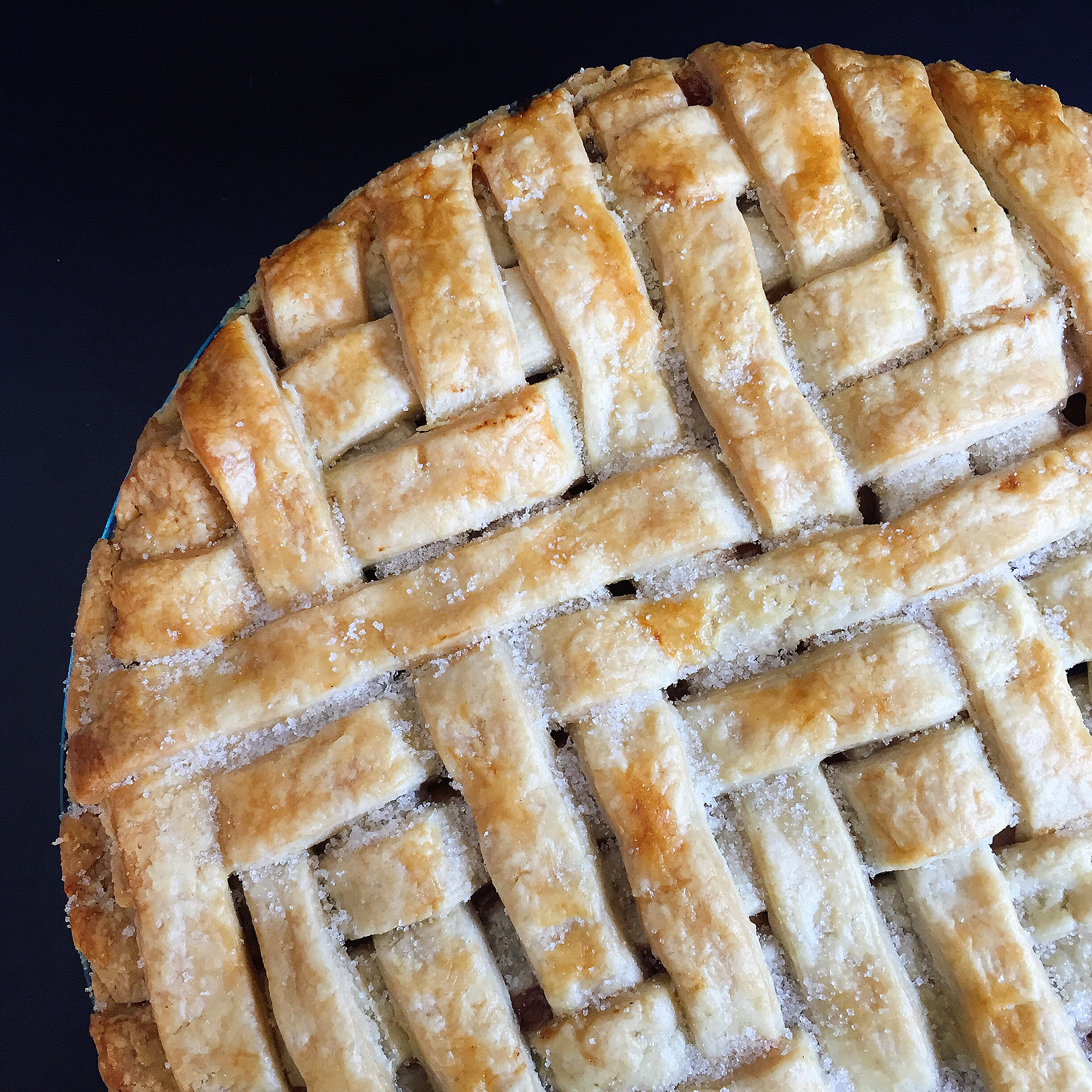
Baked herringbone lattice piecrust

== See also ==
- List of pastries
- Shortbread
