= List of pastries =

Sweet baked or fried goods

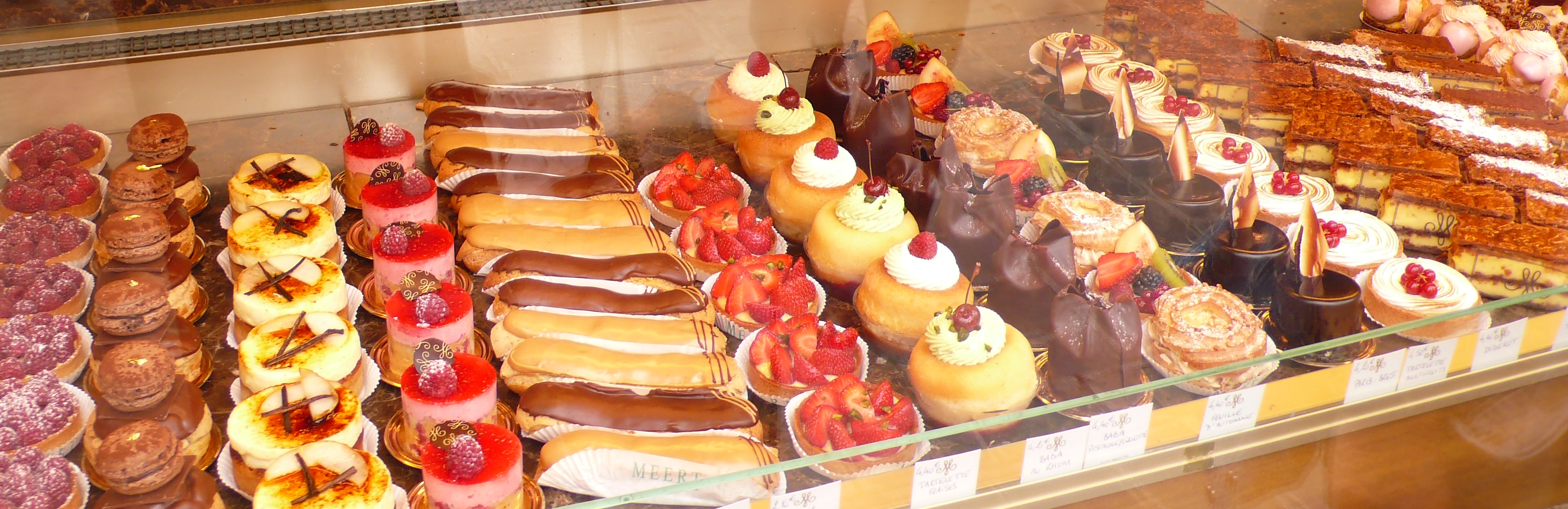
An assortment of cakes and pastries in a pâtisserie

Pastry or pastries is a North American term for sweet baked goods made with a dough with a high fat content, however, is generally used colloquially to describe all sweet baked or fried goods. This usage is a modern term, as historically, as per The American Heritage Dictionary, (Note: 1. Dough or paste of flour, water, and shortening that is baked and used as a crust for foods duch as pies. 2. Baked foods made with pastry) the term was the similar to that used in British and Australian English. (Note: 1. A mixture of flour and (usually) fat and water with (sometimes) other ingredients, made into a dough and cooked, and then used to cover, support, encase, or constitute dishes, such as described under Pie, Tart, Pastry. 2. a dish that contains partially or wholly of pastry in the first sense) It is probable that the North American term comes from the French Pâtisserie, which not only describes the bakery that makes the products but the products themselves. This include cakes, desserts and sweet pastry based products, which are made by a pastry chef, which in France is called a pâtissier. Le Cordon Bleu believe that is how the liberal meaning has come in to usage.

== List of pastries ==
=== A-E ===
Name	Image	Origin	Description
Apple strudel		Central Europe	Sliced apples and other fruit are wrapped and cooked in layers of filo pastry. The earliest known recipe is in Vienna, but several countries in central and eastern Europe claim this dish.
Bakewell pudding		United Kingdom (England)	Said in a popular story to have been first created by accident in Bakewell around 1860, this has a flaky pastry base covered with raspberry jam and topped with custard and almonds. The Bakewell tart is similar but tends to use shortcrust pastry with a layer of sponge instead of custard.
Baklava		Ottoman Empire	An Ottoman pastry that is rich and sweet, made of layers of filo pastry filled with chopped nuts and sweetened with syrup or honey.
Banitsa		Bulgaria	Prepared by layering a mixture of whisked eggs and pieces of cheese between filo pastry, which is then baked in an oven
Banket		Netherlands	Popular during the Christmas season, prepared by rolling pastry dough around an almond paste, filling, and then baking it. The log is then cut into short lengths for serving, hot or cold.
Bear claw		United States	Sweet breakfast pastry.
Beaver Tail		Canada	A fried dough pastry, individually hand-stretched to resemble a beaver's tail then covered in different toppings including cinnamon and sugar, fruit jams, chocolate, peanut butter, butter and garlic, and M&Ms. In some parts of Canada, it is also called an "Elephant Ear".
Belokranjska povitica		Slovenia	National dish that consists of a pastry roll with fillings. (English: White country (or white mountain) rolled cake).
Bichon au citron		France	Similar to a turnover in size, shape, and made of puff pastry. A major distinguishing feature is that it is filled with lemon curd. The outer layer of sugar is sometimes partially caramelized.
Birnbrot		Switzerland	A traditional turnover originating in Switzerland with a filling of dried pears
Bizcocho		Spain, Latin America	The name given in Spain and several Latin American countries to many variants of buttery flaky pastry and some cookies
Bocconotto		Italy	An Italian pastry typical of the regions of Abruzzo, Apulia, and Calabria, usually eaten at Christmas
Börek		Balkans, Middle East, Central Asia	A family of pastries or pies found in the Balkans, the Middle East, and Central Asia. The pastry is made of a thin flaky dough, such as filo, with a variety of fillings, such as meat, cheese, spinach, or potatoes.
Bossche bol		Netherlands	Sometimes called chocoladebol ("chocolate sphere") in its city of origin, is a pastry from the Dutch city of 's-Hertogenbosch (also called Den Bosch). It is effectively a large profiterole, about 12 centimetres (4.7 in) in diameter, filled with whipped cream and coated entirely or almost entirely with (usually dark) chocolate.
Bougatsa		Greece	A Greek breakfast pastry consisting of semolina, custard, feta or minced meat filling between layers of filo. When with semolina or custard filling is considered a sweet dessert and is topped with icing sugar and cinnamon powder.
Boyoz		Turkey (İzmir)	A Turkish pastry of Sephardic Jewish origin associated with İzmir, Turkey. Boyoz paste is a mixture of flour, sunflower oil and a small addition of tahini. It is kneaded by hand, and the ball of paste is left to rest for 2 hours. The paste is then flattened to the width of a dish and left to repose again. It is then kneaded and opened once more, before being formed into a roll and left to repose as such for a further period of several hours. When the tissue of the paste is still soft but about to detach into pieces, it is cut into small balls and put in rows of small pans and marinaded in vegetable oil for between half an hour and one hour. Their paste then takes an oval form and acquires the consistency of a millefeuille. The small balls can then be put on a tray into a very high-temperature oven, either in plain form or with fillings of cheese or spinach added inside.
Briouat		Morocco	A sweet puff pastry and part of Moroccan cuisine
Bundevara		Serbia	A pie filled with pumpkin, and could refer to either a savijača (made of rolled filo) or a štrudla (made of rolled dough). Both sweet and salty pies are made.
Cannoli siciliani		Italy (Sicily)	Cannoli consist of tube-shaped shells of fried pastry dough, filled with a sweet, creamy filling usually containing ricotta. They range in size from "cannulicchi", no bigger than a finger, to the fist-sized proportions typically found in Piana degli Albanesi, south of Palermo, Sicily.
Carac		Switzerland (French)	A Swiss pastry made of chocolate, usually found in the French part of Switzerland.
ChaSan		China (Huai'an)	A traditional Chinese pastry that is popular in Jiangsu Province, China, and especially in Huai'an, a historic city which is considered the home of Chasan.
Chatti Pathiri		India (Kerala)	A layered pastry made in the North Malabar and Malabar region, of Kerala State. It is made in both sweet and savory variations. The dish is very similar to the Italian lasagna. Instead of pasta, pastry sheets or pancakes made with flour, egg, oil and water are used.
Choux à la crème		France	A light pastry dough used to make profiteroles, croquembouches, éclairs, French crullers, beignets, St. Honoré cake, Indonesian kue sus, churros and gougères. It contains only butter, water, flour, and eggs. Instead of a raising agent, it employs high moisture content to create steam during cooking to puff the pastry.
Churros		Spain	Made out of fried choux pastry, very commonly eaten as breakfast in Spain, specially in the Madrid autonomous community. Churros are also found in Portugal and across Latinamerica. It is often eaten with powdered sugar and chocolate. Its shape can vary across countries.
Coca		Spain	Typically made and consumed in territories of Catalan culture. There are many varieties of cocas, with the main four ones being sweet, savory, closed and open.
Communist bandit pastry		Taiwan	A traditional Taiwanese pastry that resembles an ingot in shape, and is filled with seasonal vegetables such as cabbage and carrot, mixed with mung bean vermicelli and the vendor's signature pork stuffing, along with a fried egg. The thick pastry shell is pan-fried until crisp.
Conversation		France	A patisserie developed in the late 18th century that is made with puff pastry, filled with a frangipane cream, and topped with royal icing.
Cornulețe		Romania, Moldova	A pastry aromatised with vanilla or rum extract/essence, as well as lemon rind, and stuffed with Turkish delight, jam, chocolate, cinnamon sugar, walnuts or raisins.
Cream horn			A pastry made with flaky or puff pastry, filled with fruit or jam and whipped cream. The horn shape is made by winding overlapping pastry strips around a conical mold. After baking, a spoonful of jam or fruit is added, and the pastry is then filled with whipped cream. The pastry can also be moistened and sprinkled with sugar before baking for a sweeter, crisp finish.
Croline			A flaky (typically puff) pastry filled with various (traditionally) salty or spicy fillings. Normally the top side of the pastry is latticed. Both sweet and savory croline varieties exist.
Croquembouche		France	A traditional dessert in French cuisine, its name comes from the French words croque en bouche, meaning 'crunch in the mouth'. A form of choux pastry that is generally served as a high-piled cone of chocolate, cream-filled profiteroles all bound together with threads of caramel. It is also decorated with sugared almonds, chocolate, flowers, or ribbons; sometimes also covered in macarons or ganache. It is traditionally served during wedding reception.
Crostata		Italy	A rustic free-form version of an open fruit tart that may also be baked in a pie plate, having an inconsistent chunky filling
Dabby-Doughs			Traditionally made using the remnants of the dough leftovers from making the pie, they can also be prepared in large amounts by simply making a batch of pastry dough. The filling of a dabby-dough typically consists of a mixture of cinnamon and white sugar sprinkled on butter or margarine, rolled, sliced and baked.
Dutch letter		Netherlands	Typically prepared using flour, eggs and butter or puff pastry as its base and filled with almond paste, dusted with sugar and shaped in an "S" or other letter shape. It was introduced into the United States by Dutch immigrants in the mid 19th century.
Éclair		France (likely)	An oblong pastry made with choux dough filled with a cream and topped with icing. The dough, which is the same as that used for profiterole, is typically piped into an oblong shape with a pastry bag and baked until it is crisp and hollow inside. Once cool, the pastry then is filled with a coffee- or chocolate-flavoured pastry cream (crème pâtissière), custard, whipped cream, or chiboust cream; and iced with fondant icing. The éclair probably originated in France during the nineteenth century.
Egg yolk pastry		Taiwan	A traditional Taiwanese mooncake, in which the filling is made of salted duck egg yolk and red bean paste. Egg yolk pastries use naturally fermented salted egg yolks marinated in red soil with grape seed oil, and they are made with many layers.
Empanada		Spain	A stuffed bread or pastry baked or fried in many countries in Western Europe, Latin America, and parts of Southeast Asia. The name comes from the Spanish verb empanar, meaning to wrap or coat in bread. Empanada is made by folding a dough or bread patty around the stuffing. The stuffing usually consists of a variety of meats, cheeses, huitlacoche, vegetables or fruits, among others. Empanadas trace their origins to Galicia and Portugal. They first appeared in mediaeval Iberia during the time of the Moorish invasions. A cookbook published in Catalan in 1520, the Libre del Coch by Ruperto de Nola, mentions empanadas filled with seafood among its recipes of Catalan, Italian, French, and Arabian food. In turn, it is believed that empanadas and the similar calzones are both derived from the Indian meat-filled pies, samosas.

=== F-J ===
Name	Image	Origin	Description
Fazuelos, Fijuelas, or Deblas		Jewish (Sephardic)	A fried thin dough made of flour and a large number of eggs. A traditional Sephardic Jewish pastry, fazuelos are usually eaten during the Purim holiday. In Italy, fazuelos are called orecchie di Ammon meaning "Haman's ears" in reference to Haman, the villain of the Purim story. Turkish Jews add brandy to the dough and Moroccan Jews eat them with cinnamon and syrup.
Flaons		Spain	Flaons have different shapes, and fillings usually consist of some type of cheese, varying according to the location. Sweet flaons are usually sweetened with sugar, but honey was traditionally used more often. Historically the first recorded mention of these cakes is from 1252 and they are mentioned as well in Ramon Llull's book Blanquerna, written in 1283.
Flies graveyard		United Kingdom (England)	"Flies Graveyard" or "Flies Cemetery" are nicknames used in various counties of England for sweet pastries or shortbread biscuits filled with currants or raisins, which are the "flies" in the "graveyard" or "cemetery". The mixture is similar to sweet mince pies.
Galette		France	Galette is a term used in French cuisine to designate various types of flat, round or freeform crusty cakes or pies. One of the most known is the "galette des rois".
Gâteau Basque		France (Basque region)	Gâteau Basque is typically constructed from layers of an almond flour based cake with a filling of either pastry cream or preserved cherries.
Gibanica		Balkans	A traditional Serbian pastry dish, usually made with white cheese, now popular throughout the Balkans. Recipes can range from sweet to savory, and from very simple to festive and elaborate multi-layered cakes.
Gujiya		India	A traditional Indian pastry, typically prepared by filling a round, flat pastry with a sweet filling made of dried fruits, grated coconut and condensed milk solids. It is usually fried in ghee, and sometimes soaked in sugar syrup. It is popular in the northern part of India during the festival of Holi.
Gözleme		Turkey	A savory traditional Turkish handmade and hand-rolled turnover. Fresh pastry is rolled out, filled and sealed, then cooked over a griddle. Fillings include spinach, beyaz peynir, minced meat, egg and other foodstuffs.
Gustavus Adolphus pastry		Sweden	Pastry named for King Gustavus Adolphus of Sweden, eaten every year on his memorial day, Gustavus Adolphus Day, 6 November. There are different recipes, but what they all have in common is a portrait of the king on top, made in chocolate or marzipan.
Heong Peng		Malaysia	Heong Peng resemble slightly flattened balls, containing a sweet sticky filling made from malt and shallots, which is covered by a flaky baked crust and garnished with sesame seeds on the surface. Popular with the Malaysian Chinese community, especially those in Northern Peninsular Malaysia.
Huff paste		United Kingdom (England)	Huff paste was a cooking technique that involved making a stiff pie shell or "coffin" using a mixture of flour, suet (raw beef or mutton fat), and boiling water. When cooked, a tough protective layer was created around the food inside. The pastry would often be discarded as it was virtually inedible. Its main purpose was to create a solid container for the pie's ingredients. A dish from Wiltshire called the Devizes Pie, is layered forcemeat or offal cooked under a huff paste.
Jambon		Ireland	Square pastries filled with cheese and chunks of ham.
Jesuite		France	A triangular, flake pastry filled with frangipane cream and topped with sliced almonds and powdered sugar. The pastry originated in France and the name refers to the triangular shape of a Jesuit’s hat.
Joulutorttu		Finland	A Christmas pastry that is traditionally made from puff pastry in the shape of a star or pinwheel and filled with prune jam and often dusted with icing sugar.

=== K-O ===
Name	Image	Origin	Description
Kanafeh		Middle East	A Middle Eastern sweet made of very fine vermicelli-like pastry. It is sometimes known as shredded filo. Kanafeh, along with the closely related qata'if, is recorded in medieval Arab cookbooks from various regions. It has also been a staple of the cuisines of the former Ottoman Empire in the Eastern Mediterranean. Several variations of the dish exist.
Kolompeh		Iran	Kolompeh looks like a pie with a mixture of minced dates with cardamom powder and other flavoring inside. Dates, wheat flour, walnuts and cooking oil are the main ingredients.
Komaj sehen		Iran (Kerman Province)	Prepared with dates and various nuts
Kouign-amann		France (Brittany)	A Breton cake containing layers of butter and sugar folded in, similar in fashion to puff pastry albeit with fewer layers. The sugar caramelizes during baking. The name derives from the Breton words for cake (kouign) and butter (amann).
Krempita		Balkans	A well-known dessert from the Balkans, specifically the former Yugoslavia. The dish is usually prepared with puff pastry dough.
Kringle		Scandinavia	A Scandinavian baked good made with either pastry or bread, a Nordic variety of pretzel, which arrived with Roman Catholic monks in the 13th century, especially in Denmark. It developed further into several kinds of sweet, salty or filled pastries. The word originates from the Old Norse kringla, meaning ring or circle.
Kroštule		Croatia	A traditional pastry from Dalmatia and Istria, made by deep frying the prepared dough.
Ladies' navels		Turkey	Ladies' navels (kadın göbeği) are balls of choux pastry which are given a dimple, deep-fried and then soaked in syrup. Other Turkish pastries have sensuous names such as girls' breasts (kız memesi) and lips of the beauty (dilber dudağı).
Lattice			A pastry used in a criss-crossing pattern of strips in the preparation of various foods. Latticed pastry is used as a type of lid on many various tarts and pies. The openings between the lattice allows fruit juices in pie fillings to evaporate during the cooking process, which can caramelize the filling. Pictured is a strawberry-rhubarb pie with lattice pastry.
Leipziger Lerche		Germany	A pastry of Leipzig, Germany, the name originates from the singing bird lark (German: Lerche), which was roasted with herbs and eggs or served as a filling in pastries. In the year 1720 alone, 400,000 larks were sold in Leipzig as a delicacy. A typical version consists of a shortcrust filled with a mixture of crushed almonds, nuts and a cherry. The cherry symbolises the heart of the bird. It is topped with a grid of two crossed dough strips. The term Leipziger Lerche has been protected by the Saxonian bakery guild since 2004.
Lek-tau-phong		Taiwan	A traditional Taiwanese mooncake, in which the filling is made of sweet mung bean paste stuffed with lard and shallots and baked, and sometimes a little pork is added.
Linzer torte		Austria	A torte with a lattice design on top of the pastry, named after the city of Linz, Austria. A very short, crumbly pastry made of flour, unsalted butter, egg yolks, lemon zest, cinnamon and lemon juice, and ground nuts, usually hazelnuts, but even walnuts or almonds are used, covered with a filling of redcurrant jam or, alternatively, plum butter, thick raspberry, or apricot jam.
Makmur		Malaysia, Singapore and Brunei	Traditional Malay kuih made from butter, ghee and flour, and served during special occasion of Eid al-Fitr. Makmur is identified with its white colour and usually in a round shape.
Malsouka		North Africa	A Tunisian pastry. Sheets of malsouqa are usually sold in stacks wrapped in cellophane. Malsouqa are used to make samosa and brik (a Tunisian savory pastry), in addition to dishes with a variety of other fillings.
Mandryky		Ukraine	A pastry filled with cottage cheese. First mentinoned during the 16th century. Traditionally consumed after the end of Apostles' Fast.
Masan		Tibet	A pastry in Tibetan cuisine made with tsampa, dry cubic or curd cheese, yak butter, brown sugar and water.
Miguelitos		Spain (La Roda, Castile-La Mancha)	Pastry-cake prepared from soft puff pastry, filled with a creamy custard and covered with powdered sugar.
Milhoja		Argentina	A dessert made with stacked layers of puff pastry filled with dulce de leche; a creamy mix of condensed milk, sugar, and vanilla; or sometimes white chocolate. In Argentina, it's filled with Dulce de leche and topped with Italian merengue
Milk-cream strudel		Central Europe	A traditional Viennese strudel, a popular pastry in Austria and in many countries in Europe that once belonged to the Austro-Hungarian empire (1867–1918). The milk-cream strudel is an oven-baked pastry dough stuffed with a sweet bread, raisin and cream filling and served in the pan with hot vanilla sauce.
Mille-feuille		France	The mille-feuille ("thousand sheets"), vanilla slice, cream slice, custard slice, also known as the Napoleon or kremschnitt, is a pastry originating in France. Traditionally, a mille-feuille is made up of three layers of puff pastry (pâte feuilletée), alternating with two layers of pastry cream (crème pâtissière), but sometimes whipped cream, or jam is substituted. The top pastry layer is dusted with confectioner's sugar, and sometimes cocoa, or pulverized nuts (e.g., roasted almonds). Alternatively the top is glazed with icing or fondant in alternating white (icing) and brown (chocolate) stripes, and combed.
Moorkop		Netherlands	Consists of a profiterole (cream puff) filled with whipped cream. The top of the profiterole is glazed with white or dark chocolate. Often there is whipped cream on the top, with a slice of tangerine or a piece of pineapple.
Naiyou subing		Taiwan	A Taiwanese buttery flaky pastry made into a thin circle. The dough has many layers, of which each is very thin and crisp. The filling is composed of butter and maltose.
Nazook		Armenia	Also spelled nazouk or nazuk, it is a crisp, but soft, and buttery, sweet, but not too sweet, pastry made with flour, butter, sugar, sour cream, yeast, vanilla extract and eggs for the wash. After the dough is made, it is refrigerated, then rolled out flat, covered in a spread made of flour, sugar, vanilla and butter, kind of like a streusel topping, rolled up into a long, skinny loaf shape. The strip is washed with egg wash, cut into sections and then baked.
Nun's puffs		France	Made from butter, milk, flour, sugar, eggs and sometimes honey, recipes call for pan frying (traditionally in lard), re-frying and then baking, or baking straight away.
Öçpoçmaq		Russia (Tatar)	Sometimes known as treugolnik (треугольник) among the Russian population, a Tatar national dish, and an essential food in Tatar culture. Usually, öçpoçmaq is a triangular pastry, filled with minced beef, onion and potatoes. Öçpoçmaq is eaten with bouillon or with tea.

=== P-T ===
Name	Image	Origin	Description
Pa de pessic, bescuit, pa d'En Pou		Catalan Countries	Pa de pessic, bescuit (as it is called in the Valencian Community and other places) or pa d'En Pou (as it is called in Mallorca) is a type of thin, light and spongy dough cake, made of flour, eggs, sugar and frequently yeast. Many times it is perfumed with lemon or orange zest, and sometimes with a little cinnamon or some liquor. The basic cake that only contains eggs, sugar and flour is often called Genovese (for every 100g of flour it contains 4 eggs and 100g of sugar) and is the basis of many filled cakes.
Pain au chocolat		France	"Chocolate bread", also called a chocolatine in southern France and in French Canada, is a French pastry consisting of a cuboid-shaped piece of yeast-leavened laminated dough, similar to puff pastry, with one or two pieces of chocolate in the centre.
Pain aux raisins		France	Typically a variant on the croissant or pain au chocolat, made with a leavened butter pastry, with raisins added, shaped in a spiral with a crème pâtissière filling. Known in Australia as an "escargot", a member of the pâtisserie viennoise family of baked foods.
Palmier		France, French Algeria	A "palm tree" (French: palmier), "pig's ear" or "elephant ear" palmiers are a German, Spanish, French, Italian, Jewish, and Portuguese pastry (among other cuisines, like those of the former Spanish colonies in the Americas) formed in a palm or butterfly shape. Made using puff pastry, sugar and sometimes honey.
Pannenkoek		United States by German Americans	A style of pancake with origins in the Netherlands. Pannenkoeken are usually larger (up to a foot in diameter) and much thinner than their American or Scotch pancake counterparts, but not as thin as Crêpes.
Pan dulce		Latin America	Literally "sweet bread", pan dulce is a common treat in Mexico and other Latin American countries.
Panzerotti		Italy (central and southern)	Filled, savory pastries, different forms of which are popular in Italy, as well as among Italian immigrants to Canada and the United States. Panzerotti originated in central and southern Italy, especially in Apulia. They are small versions of the calzone or closed pizza, but produced with a softer dough. The most common fillings are tomato and mozzarella, but spinach, mushrooms, baby corn, and ham are often used. The dish has many variations.
Papanași		Romania, Moldova	A Papanași is a Romanian traditional fried pastry resembling a small sphere, usually filled with a soft cheese such as urdă and cherry or morello jam. Pictured is Papanași with sour cherries (morello) and powdered sugar.
Paper wrapped cake		Hong Kong	Chinese pastry, one of the most standard pastries served in Hong Kong. It can also be found in most Chinatown bakery shops overseas. In essence, it is a chiffon cake baked in a paper cup.
Paris–Brest		France	Made of choux pastry and a praline flavoured cream. It was created in 1891 to commemorate the Paris–Brest–Paris bicycle race. Its circular shape is representative of a wheel. It became popular with riders on the Paris–Brest cycle race, partly because of its energy-giving high calorific value, and is now found in pâtisseries all over France .
Paste		Mexico	Pastry from Hidalgo, Mexico
Pastel		Latin America	A name given to different typical dishes of many countries with Iberian heritage. For example, in Brazil, a pastel is a common fast food dish, consisting of thin pastry envelopes wrapped around assorted fillings, then deep fried in vegetable oil. Pictured is a Brazilian pastel.
Pasticciotto		Italy	Type of filled Italian pastry. Depending on the region, they are traditionally filled with either ricotta cheese or egg custard.
Pastizz		Malta	A savory pastry from Malta, pastizzi usually have a filling either of ricotta or of mushy peas, and are called pastizzi tal-irkotta, "cheesecakes", or pastizzi tal-piżelli, "peacakes", accordingly. Pastizzi are a popular and well-known Maltese food. Pictured are two varieties of Maltese pastizzi.
Pastry heart		United States (Buffalo, New York area)	A regional dessert item found in the Buffalo, New York area. The pastry heart is a heart shaped flaky puff pastry, similar to a palmier or palm leaves pastry, that is usually topped with a white sugar icing that has a hard shell but is soft on the inside.
Pâté Chaud		Vietnam	A puff pastry in Vietnamese cuisine, its name means "hot pie" in French. The pastry is made of a light, layered and flaky exterior with a meat filling. Traditionally, the filling consists of pork meat, but today, chicken and beef are commonly used.
Phyllo		Middle East, Balkans	Paper-thin sheets of unleavened flour dough used for making pastries. filo is often used in Middle Eastern and Balkan cuisine. Pictured is Baklava made with the dough. An early, thick form of filo appears to be of Central Asian Turkic origin. May also be spelt as "Filo pastry"; this is quite a common spelling for this form of pastry in the United Kingdom.
Pignolata		Italy	A soft pastry, covered in chocolate and lemon-flavoured syrup or icing. This pastry is half covered or iced in one flavouring and the other half in the other flavour, which hardens when the pignolata is ready to be served
Pineapple cake		Taiwan	A Taiwanese sweet traditional pastry and dessert containing butter, flour, egg, sugar, and pineapple jam or slices.
Pionono		Hispanic	May refer to several varieties of pastry popular in Spain, Latin America and The Philippines. Pictured are pionono in Málaga, Spain.
Pithivier		France (probably Pithiviers)	(Pithiviers in French) is a round, enclosed pie usually made by baking two disks of puff pastry, with filling stuffed in between. It has the appearance of a hump and is traditionally decorated with spiral lines drawn from the top outwards with the point of a knife, and scalloping the edge. The filling is always placed as a lump in the middle of the bottom dough layer, rather than spread on it, because it would then liquefy and leak during baking. The pie is traditionally finished with a distinct shine to the top of the crust, by egg-washing beforehand, or by caramelising a dusting of confectioner's sugar at the end of baking, or both. Whilst the filling of the Pithivier is often a sweet frangipane of almond paste (optionally combined with fruit such as cherry or plum), savory pies with a meat or cheese filling can also be termed as a Pithivier.
Pizzelle		Italy	Waffle cookies made with flour, eggs, sugar, butter or vegetable oil, and flavoring (usually anise or anisette, or vanilla or lemon zest)
Plăcintă		Romania, Moldova, Ukraine	Plăcintă is a Romanian traditional pastry resembling a thin, small round or square-shaped cake, usually filled with a soft cheese such as Urdă or apples. Also made with pumpkin filling, they were brought to the US by the Black Sea Germans who had lived in the territories of the southern Russian Empire (modern-day Ukraine and Moldova).
Poffertjes (Dutch) Æbleskiver (Danish)		Northern Europe	A style of pancake with origins in the Northern Europe. They are much smaller and thicker than their American or Scotch pancake or as French Crêpes. They can be leavened by yeast, egg white, or a chemical agent like baking powder.
Pogača		Balkans	Puff pastry eaten in Albania, Bosnia and Herzegovina, Bulgaria, Croatia, Montenegro, North Macedonia, Serbia, Slovenia, Hungary (see pogácsa) and Turkey (where it is called poğaça) with variations. It is called pogatschen in Austria. Pogača is sometimes served hot as an appetizer instead of bread. Hot pogača filled with sour cream (or beyaz peynir in Turkey and Bulgaria) is considered a particularly delicious specialty.
Poppy seed roll		Central Europe	Roll of sweet yeast bread (a viennoiserie) with a dense, rich, bittersweet filling of poppy seed. A popular cuisine in parts of Central Europe, Eastern Europe and in Israel. An alternative filling is a paste of minced walnuts, making it a walnut roll.
Pot pie		United States, Canada	In US and Canadian dialects, is a type of meat pie with a top pie crust that is commonly used throughout the continent, consisting of flaky pastry. Pot pies may be made with a variety of fillings, including poultry, beef, seafood, or plant-based meat substitute fillings, and may also differ in the types of crust. Chicken pot pie is the most popular variety of the dish.
Prekmurska gibanica		Slovenia	Gibanica or layered cake that includes a thinly-rolled pastry dough in its preparation. It originated in the region of Prekmurje, Slovenia. It contains poppy seeds, walnuts, apples, raisins, and ricotta fillings. Although native to Prekmurje, it has achieved the status of a national speciality of Slovenia. It is also popular in northern Croatia.
Profiterole		France	Known as a "cream puff" in the United States, a profiterole is a choux pastry ball filled with whipped cream, pastry cream, or ice cream. This treat is typically very sweet. The puffs may be decorated or left plain or garnished with chocolate sauce, caramel, or a dusting of powdered sugar.
Puff pastry		Europe	In baking, a puff pastry is a light, flaky, leavened pastry containing several layers of fat which is in solid state at 20 °C (68 °F). In raw form, puff pastry is a dough that is spread with solid fat and repeatedly folded and rolled out (never mashed, as this will destroy layering) and used to produce various pastries. It is sometimes called a "water dough" or détrempe.
Puits d'amour		France	A butter pastry with a hollow center. The center is usually stuffed with redcurrant jelly or raspberry jam; a later variation replaced the jam with vanilla pastry cream. The surface of the cake is sprinkled with confectioners' sugar or covered with caramel. The name has erotic connotations; it literally translates into English as 'wells of love.’
Punsch-roll		Sweden	A Swedish, small cylindrical pastry covered with green marzipan with the ends dipped in chocolate, with an interior consisting of a mix of crushed cookies, butter, and cacao, flavoured with punsch liqueur. The Dutch variant is called mergpijpje, and is cream-colored instead of green. Often called dammsugare ("vacuum cleaner"), referring not only to its appearance, but also to the supposed practice of the pastry baker collecting crumbs from the day's cookies for filling. Other names are arraksrulle (as arrak is an ingredient in punsch) and "150-ohmer" (due to the brown-green-brown coloring). In Denmark, these treats are known as Træstammer ("wooden logs"); the interior cacao-paste is flavoured with rum and the marzipan is usually not coloured.
Punschkrapfen		Austria	Translated in English as "punch cake", a classical confection of pastry with a rum flavor. It is similar to the French pastry, the petit four. Commonly available in pastry shops and bakeries in Austria. It is a cake filled with cake crumbs, nougat chocolate, apricot jam and then soaked with rum.
Qottab		Iran	An almond-filled deep-fried Persian cake, prepared with flour, almonds, powdered sugar, vegetable oil, and cardamom. The city of Yazd is well known for its qottab.
Quesito		United States (Puerto Rico)	A cheese-filled pastry twist from Puerto Rico. The cheese is usually whipped with vanilla, eggs, and sugar. The cheese can also be whipped with guava, papaya and other tropical fruit preserves. The mixture is stuffed into a dough that resembles puff pastry, coated in a sugary caramelized syrup, and baked.
Roti john		Malaysia	A type of sandwich using Baguette-type loaf served with omelette, minced meat and onion. A popular snack in Malaysia, also in Brunei and Singapore.
Roti tissue		Malaysia	Also known as roti tisu or tissue prats, one of the more-creative-looking Malaysian Mamak foods. It is also known as roti helikopter (helicopter bread). Roti tissue is a thinner version of the traditional roti canai, as thin as a piece of 40–50 cm round-shaped tissue. The finishing touches to the making of roti tissue require skill, and they depend on the creativity of the maker. Pictured: Roti tissue, and a glass of Teh tarik
Roze koek		Netherlands	Roze koek ("pink cake") is a typical Dutch pastry that consists of a small flat cake with a layer of pink fondant. The most well-known brand is Glacé.
Rugelach		Jewish (Ashkenazi)	A Jewish pastry of Ashkenazic origin. A more probable origin is that of its Eastern European (Romanian) traditional pastry counterpart called Cornulete. Traditional rugelach are made in the form of a crescent by rolling a triangle of dough around a filling. Some sources state that the rugelach and the French croissant share a common Viennese ancestor, crescent-shaped pastries commemorating the lifting of the Turkish siege in 1793 (this could be a reference to the Battle of Vienna in 1683). This appears to be an urban legend, however, as both the rugelach and its supposed ancestor (the Kipfel or Kipferl) pre-date the Early Modern era, and the croissant in its modern form did not originate earlier than the 19th century (see viennoiserie).
Runeberg's torte		Finland	A Finnish pastry flavored with almonds and rum or arrack and usually weighing about 100 grams. There is usually raspberry jam in a sugar ring on the torte. The torte got its name from the Finnish poet Johan Ludvig Runeberg (1804–1877) who, according to legend, enjoyed the torte with punsch for every breakfast.
Rustico		Italy	Made with puff pastry and a stuffing that varies style by style
Sacher Torte		Austria	A chocolate cake consisting of a dense chocolate cake with a layer of apricot jam in between two halves, coated in dark chocolate icing on the top and sides
Samosa		Indian subcontinent	A fried or baked pastry with a savory filling such as spiced potatoes, onions, peas, lentils, ground lamb or chicken. The size, shape and consistency may vary, but many versions are triangular. Samosas are often accompanied by chutney. Samosas are a popular appetizer or snack in the Indian subcontinent, Southeast Asia, Central Asia and Southwest Asia, the Arabian Peninsula, the Mediterranean, the Horn of Africa, North Africa, and South Africa.
Schaumrolle		Austria	Cone or tube of pastry, often filled with whipped cream
Schnecken		Germany	Schnecken were a traditional Saturday morning treat in German homes at the beginning of the 20th century, and was also commonly found in the Jewish immigrant communities in the Philadelphia and Baltimore areas of the United States. The name schnecken means "snails" in English, and refers to the shape of the pastry. Schnecken are commonly confused with rugelach, another German pastry that is different in two respects: (1) schnecken dough is made with sour cream, while rugelach is made with cream cheese; and (2) schnecken are rolled and sliced, whereas rugelach are formed from individual triangles of dough.
Schneeball		Germany	Made from shortcrust pastry, they are especially popular in the area of the German town of Rothenburg ob der Tauber (Bavaria). Its name (German for "snowball") derives from its round ball-like shape with a diameter of about eight to ten centimeters and the traditional decoration with confectioner's sugar. The main ingredients are flour, eggs, sugar, butter, cream, and plum schnaps. To give it the characteristic shape, the dough is rolled out and cut with a dough cutter into even strips. The strips are then arranged alternately over and under a stick, or the handle of a wooden spoon. Eventually, the stick is lifted and slowly removed while the dough stripes are formed into a loose ball. Using a special holder called a Schneeballeneisen in order to retain the shape, the ball is deep-fried in boiling fat until golden brown, and finally dusted with confectioner's sugar while still warm.
Schuxen		Germany	A popular pastry in Upper Bavaria, schuxen is an elongate fried dough pastry made from rye flour and yeast. Similar to krapfen with the difference that it is not sweet. Nowadays, they are rare, and few bakers produce them.
Semla		Sweden	The oldest version of the semla was a plain bread bun, eaten in a bowl of warm milk. In Swedish this is known as hetvägg, from Middle Low German hete Weggen (hot wedges) or German heisse Wecken (hot buns) and falsely interpreted as "hotwall". Today, the Swedish-Finnish semla consists of a cardamom-spiced wheat bun which has its top cut off and insides scooped out, and is then filled with a mix of the scooped-out bread crumbs, milk and almond paste, topped with whipped cream. The cut-off top serves as a lid and is dusted with powdered sugar. Some people still eat it in a bowl of hot milk.
Sfenj		North Africa	A Moroccan, Algerian and Tunisian doughnut, cooked in oil. Sfenjs are eaten sprinkled with sugar or soaked in honey. Sfenj is an Arabic word ("isfenj") which means "sponge".
Sfințișori		Romania, Moldova	Traditional pastries to commemorate the Christian feast of the Forty Martyrs of Sebaste. Sfințișori dough is baked in large shapes of the figure 8, then soaked in honey syrup with ground walnuts.
Sfogliatelle		Italy	Sfogliatelle are shell-shaped filled pastries native to Italian cuisine. "Sfogliatelle" means "many leaves/layers", the pastry's texture resembling leaves stacked on each other. Filling recipes also vary; some examples are an orange-flavored ricotta filling, almond paste or candied peel of citron. Italian-American bakeries, especially in the New York City area, created a cousin pastry to the sfogliatelle in the 1900s called a "lobster tail" or "eggplant" version. The pastry has the same outside as sfogliatelle, but instead of the ricotta filling, there is a French cream, similar to whipped cream, inside.
Shortcrust pastry		Europe	Often used for the base of a tart, quiche or pie. It does not puff up during baking because it usually contains no leavening agent. It is possible to make shortcrust pastry with self-raising flour, however. Shortcrust pastry can be used to make both sweet and savory pies.
Sou		China	Dried flaky Chinese pastry found in a variety of Chinese cuisines. In dim sum restaurants, char siu sou (叉燒酥) is the most common version available. Other varieties may include century egg and lotus seed paste. These are commonly found in Hong Kong or Singapore in Asia. They may occasionally be found in some overseas Chinatowns. In Shanghai cuisine, several dried varieties are available, such as peanut sou (花生酥), green bean sou (綠豆酥) or walnut sou (核桃酥). People often buy them for souvenirs in boxed forms.
Savory spinach pie		Balkans	A savory spinach pie is in the burek family of pastries. It typically consists of a filling of chopped spinach, feta cheese (sometimes in combination with ricotta cheese, as it is less expensive, and adds creaminess), onions or scallions, beaten egg, and seasoning. The filling is wrapped or layered in filo pastry with butter or olive oil, either in a large pan from which individual servings are cut, or rolled into individual triangular servings (see burek).
Steak and kidney pie		Britain	A savory pie filled principally with a mixture of diced beef, diced kidney (which may be beef, lamb, veal, or pork) and onion. Its contents are generally similar to those of steak and kidney puddings.
Strudel		Central Europe	Layered pastry, typically with a sweet filling inside. Often served with cream. Strudel became well known and gained popularity in the 18th century through the Habsburg Empire. Pictured is a pecan strudel. See also – Apple strudel; Milk-cream strudel
Struffoli		Italy	Deep fried balls of sweet dough that are formed into balls about the size of marbles. Crunchy on the outside and light inside, struffoli are mixed with honey and other sweet ingredients and formed into mounds or rings
Stutenkerl		Germany	Part of the Saint Nicholas tradition in the German speaking countries. Made of Stuten, sweet leavened dough, in the form of a man (Kerl is German for 'lad' or 'fellow'). Stutenkerl is available usually around Saint Nicholas' Day, 6 December, but in parts of the Rhineland already at Saint Martin's Day in November. The pastry often contains raisins and a clay pipe. This pipe may have something to do with the Protestant Reformation, making the originally Catholic bishop figure more secular.
Sufganiyah		Israel	A ball-shaped doughnut that is first deep-fried, then pierced and injected with jelly or custard, and then topped with powdered sugar. Widely consumed in Israel in the weeks leading up to and including the Hanukkah holiday. The same type of deep-fried bun is a traditional pastry in German-speaking countries and has diverse names. There, it is traditionally consumed on New Year's Eve and the carnival holidays. In Denmark, they are well known as Berliner van kuchen or just Berliner.
Suncake		Taiwan	A Taiwanese dessert originally from the city of Taichung, in central Taiwan. The typical fillings consist of maltose (condensed malt sugar), and they are usually sold in special gift boxes as souvenirs for visitors. Some famous suncake pastry shops always have long lines of people waiting to buy boxed suncakes. Suncakes are round, and they may vary in size. They are characterized by flaky crusts. Most people eat them with tea, and some people dissolve them in hot water to make a porridge-like dessert.
Taiyaki		Japan	A Japanese pastry shaped to resemble a bream or Asian carp and filled with red bean paste or other fillings such as custard and chocolate. It is derived from the similar Japanese pastry Imagawayaki. Taiyaki is also popular in other East Asian countries such as South Korea, where it is known as bungeoppang.
Taro pastry		Taiwan	A Taiwanese shortbread snack with a spherical shape and made with taro as a sweet filling.
Toaster pastry		United States	Designed to be safely heated in a toaster, toaster pastries are a convenience food. Most toaster pastries have a fruit filling, but some contain dessert-like fillings such as chocolate or cinnamon. The Pop-Tarts brand of toaster pastries is an example of a mass-produced product widely available in the United States.
Torpil		Balkans, Poland	Typically torpedo or cone-shaped, stuffed with cream, widespread in the Balkans and Poland.
Tortell		Spain(Catalonia)	Typically O-shaped, stuffed with marzipan, and on some special occasions, is topped with glazed fruit. It is traditionally eaten on 6 January (Epiphany), at the conclusion of the Twelve Days of Christmas.
Tortita negra		Spain	Translated in English as "little black pastry", a Spanish dessert which is flat at its base and round on the sides. They are eaten in Argentina, Colombia and Venezuela, and are a popular food at children's parties.
Trdelník		Slovakia	A traditional cake and sweet pastry, known from Slovakia. There is a similar variant of the Trdelník in the Czech Republic and Hungary (under a different name), originally coming from Skalica in Slovakia. It is made from rolled dough, wrapped around a stick, then grilled and topped with sugar and a walnut mix.
Turnover			Made by placing a filling on a piece of dough, folding the dough over, and sealing it. Turnovers can be sweet or savory and are often made as a sort of portable meal or dessert, similar to a sandwich. Pictured is a sweet turnover made from puff pastry.

=== U-Z ===
Name	Image	Origin	Description
Utap		Philippines	An oval-shaped puff pastry, especially common in Cebu, where it originated. It usually consists of a combination of flour, shortening, coconut, and sugar. In order to achieve the texture of the pastry, it must undergo a two-stage baking process.
Vatrushka		Eastern Europe	Ring of dough and cottage cheese in the middle, often with raisins or bits of fruit
Vetkoek		South Africa	A traditional Afrikaner pastry, it consists of dough deep-fried in cooking oil and either filled with cooked mince (ground beef) or spread with syrup, honey, or jam.
Viennoiserie		France	Viennoiserie (French etymological sense: 'things of Vienna') are baked goods made from a yeast-leavened dough like bread, or from puff pastry, but with added ingredients (particularly eggs, butter, milk, cream and sugar) giving them a richer, sweeter character. The dough is often layered. Examples include: croissants; Vienna bread and its French equivalent, pain viennois, often shaped into baguettes; brioche; pain au chocolat; pain au lait; pain aux raisins; chouquettes; Danish pastries; bugnes; and chausson aux pommes, the French style of apple turnover.
Vlaai		Netherlands	A round-shaped pastry with fruit fillings, primarily associated with the Dutch province of Limburg (Netherlands).
Vol-au-vent		France (Paris)	French for "windblown" to describe its lightness, it is a small hollow case of puff pastry. It has been claimed to have been invented by Antonin Carême in his pastry shop, opened in Rue de la Paix, France, in 1803–04. But the pastry is mentioned at least as far back as 1797; its origin then is obscure. Vols-au-vent are typically made by cutting two circles in rolled-out puff pastry, cutting a hole in one of them, then stacking the ring-shaped piece on top of the disc-shaped piece.
Xuixo		Spain (Catalonia)	A cylindrical pastry filled with crema catalana that is deep fried and covered with crystallized sugar.
Yurla		Tibet	Wheat pastry with butter, particularly common in Nyainrong County in northern Tibet.
Zeeuwse bolus		Zeeland, Netherlands, (Jewish (Sephardic))	Sweet pastry from the Dutch province of Zeeland, made by baking a type of dough in a spiral shape and then covering it with treacle and cinnamon.
Zeppola		Italy	Deep-fried dough ball of varying size but typically about 4 inches (10 cm) in diameter. These fritters are usually topped with powdered sugar, and may be filled with custard, jelly, cannoli-style pastry cream or a butter-and-honey mixture
Zlabia		Southwest Asia, Northeast Africa	A version of the South Asian jalebi (qv) found in areas of north and northwest Africa such as Morocco, Algeria, Tunisia, and Libya. Natural ingredients include flour, yeast, yoghurt, and sugar. This is then mixed with water and cardamom.

=== Unsorted ===
- Apfelküchle
- Carolina
- Chebakia
- Coventry Godcakes
- Ghunzakhi
- Gukhwappang
- Leningradsky cake
- Osmanthus cake
- Shorgoghal

== See also ==
- Chinese bakery products
- Cuisine
- Global cuisine
- List of baked goods
- List of bread rolls
- List of breads
- List of buns
- List of cakes
- List of choux pastry dishes
- List of desserts
- List of doughnut varieties
- List of hors d'oeuvre
- List of pies, tarts and flans
- Lists of prepared foods
- List of sweet breads
