= Carolina (pastry) =

Pastry of Bilbao, Spain

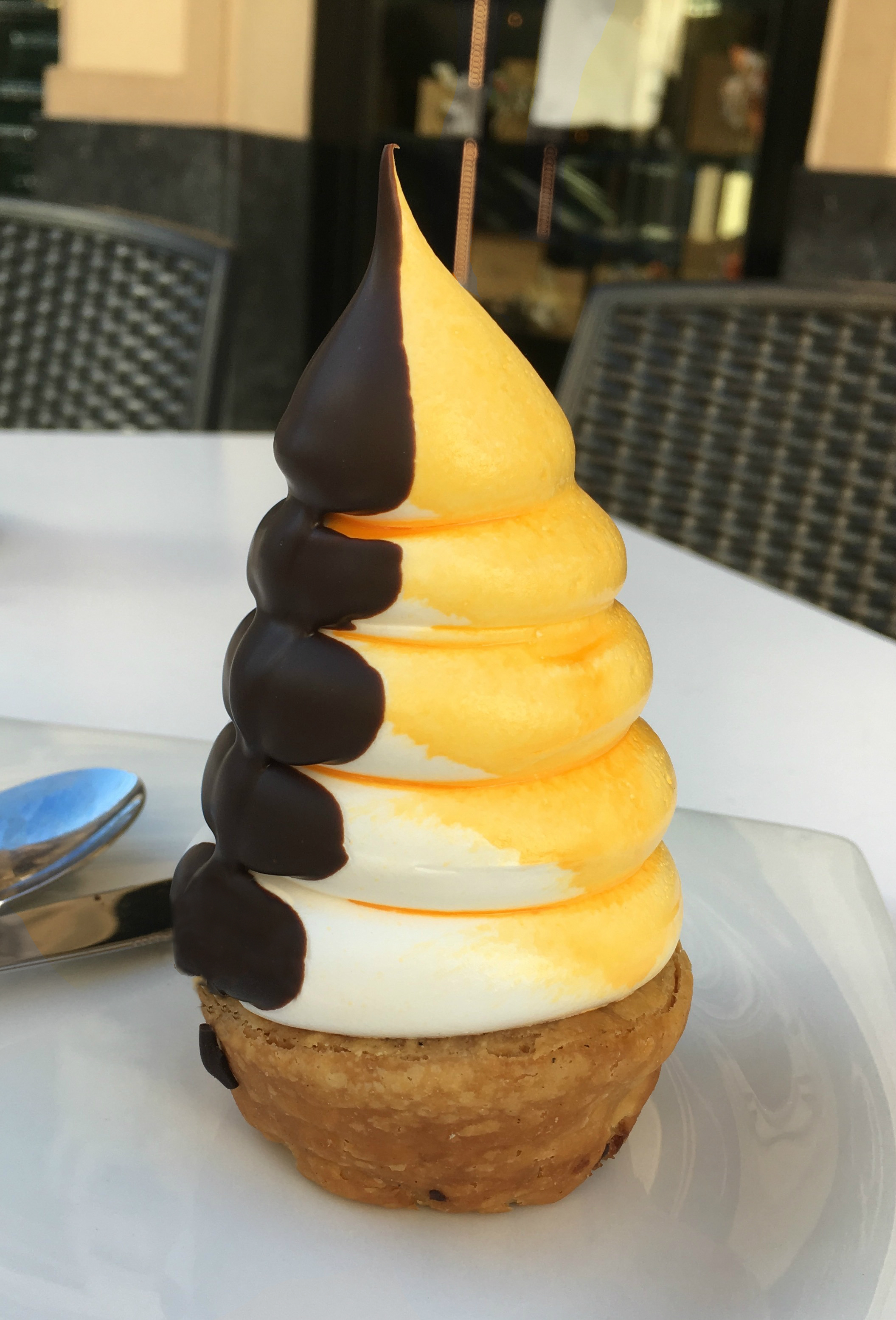
A classic Carolina from Bilbao

The Carolina is a typical pastry of Bilbao, Spain. It consists of a miniature pastry crust filled with custard and topped with a meringue cone. Typically, the cone has a coating of sweet egg yolk glaze and dark chocolate.

== Ingredients ==
The principal ingredients are: meringue, puff pastry or shortcrust pastry tartlet, egg yolk, and chocolate.

== History ==
The Marchioness of Parabere included a recipe for the Carolina in her first book, Confitería y Repostería, in 1930. In the book, she says the Carolina was invented by a pastry chef from Bilbao. His daughter, Carolina, loved meringue, so he put the meringue in a puff pastry tartlet to prevent her from getting dirty. She liked it so much, he named it after her.

The pastry is well-recognized as a Bilbao speciality, so "Señor Karolino" was the mascot for the Bilbao Carnival in 2009.

== See also ==
- List of pastries
