= Palm heart =

Palm heart can refer to:

- Palmier, a French pastry in a palm leaf shape
- Heart of palm, a vegetable harvested from the inner core and growing bud of certain palm trees
