= Carac (pastry) =

Swiss chocolate tart

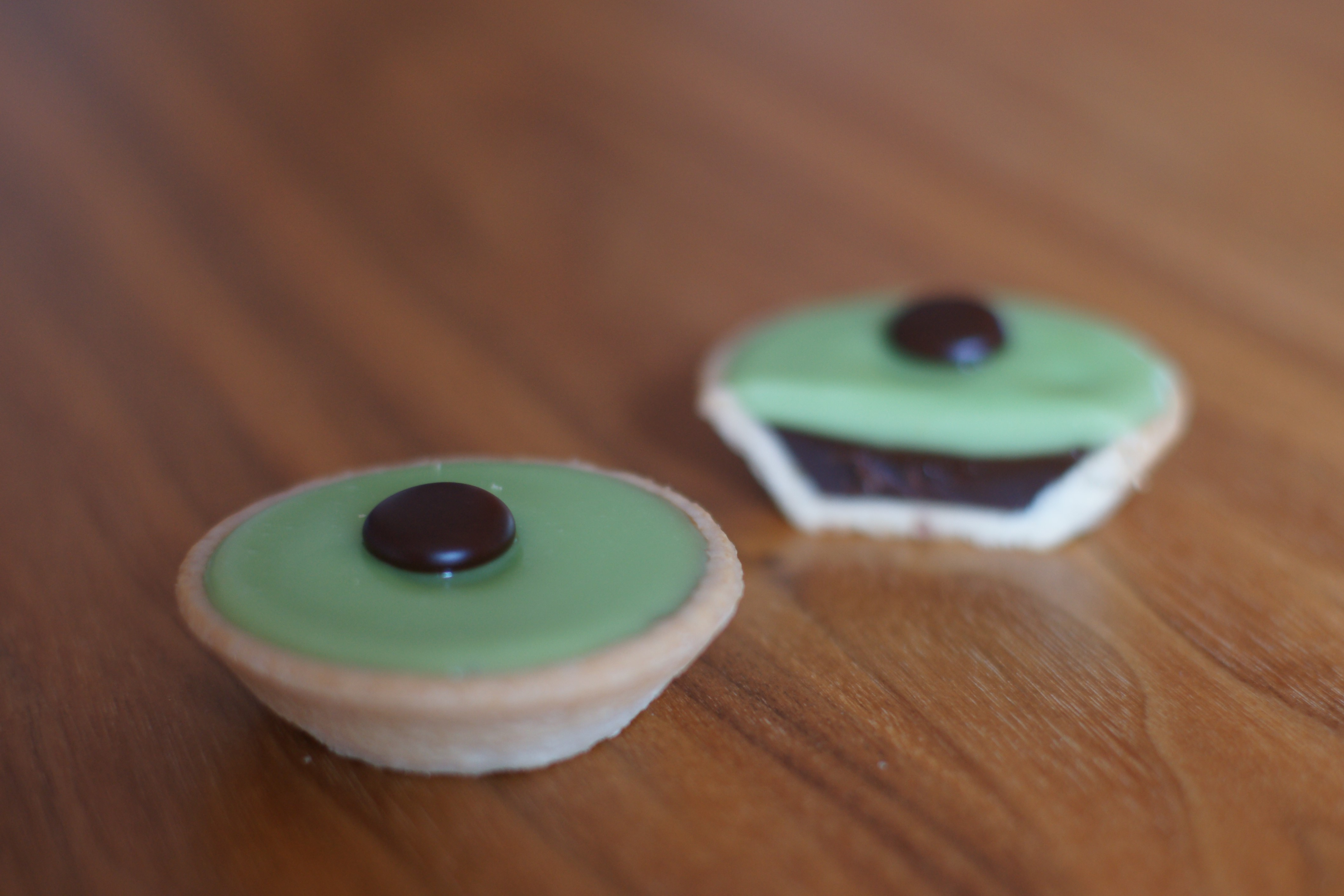
- Two caracs, one cut in half to show the filling
- Alternative names: Carac Sweet
- Type: Pastry
- Place of origin: Switzerland
- Main ingredients: Pie crust, chocolate, green icing

Carac is a tart-like Swiss dessert pastry traditionally made of ingredients such as chocolate, cream, fondant, and shortbread pie crust, usually found in the French-speaking part of Switzerland.

It consists of a pie crust filled with a light ganache of blended cream and chocolate that is covered with green colored icing or fondant. Size varies from around 6 centimetres (2.4 in) in diameter for single person tartlets to 25 centimetres (9.8 in) for a larger version of the carac more suited for large gatherings, served in slices, much like cake or pie.

== See also ==
- List of pastries
