= Coventry Godcake =

English pastry

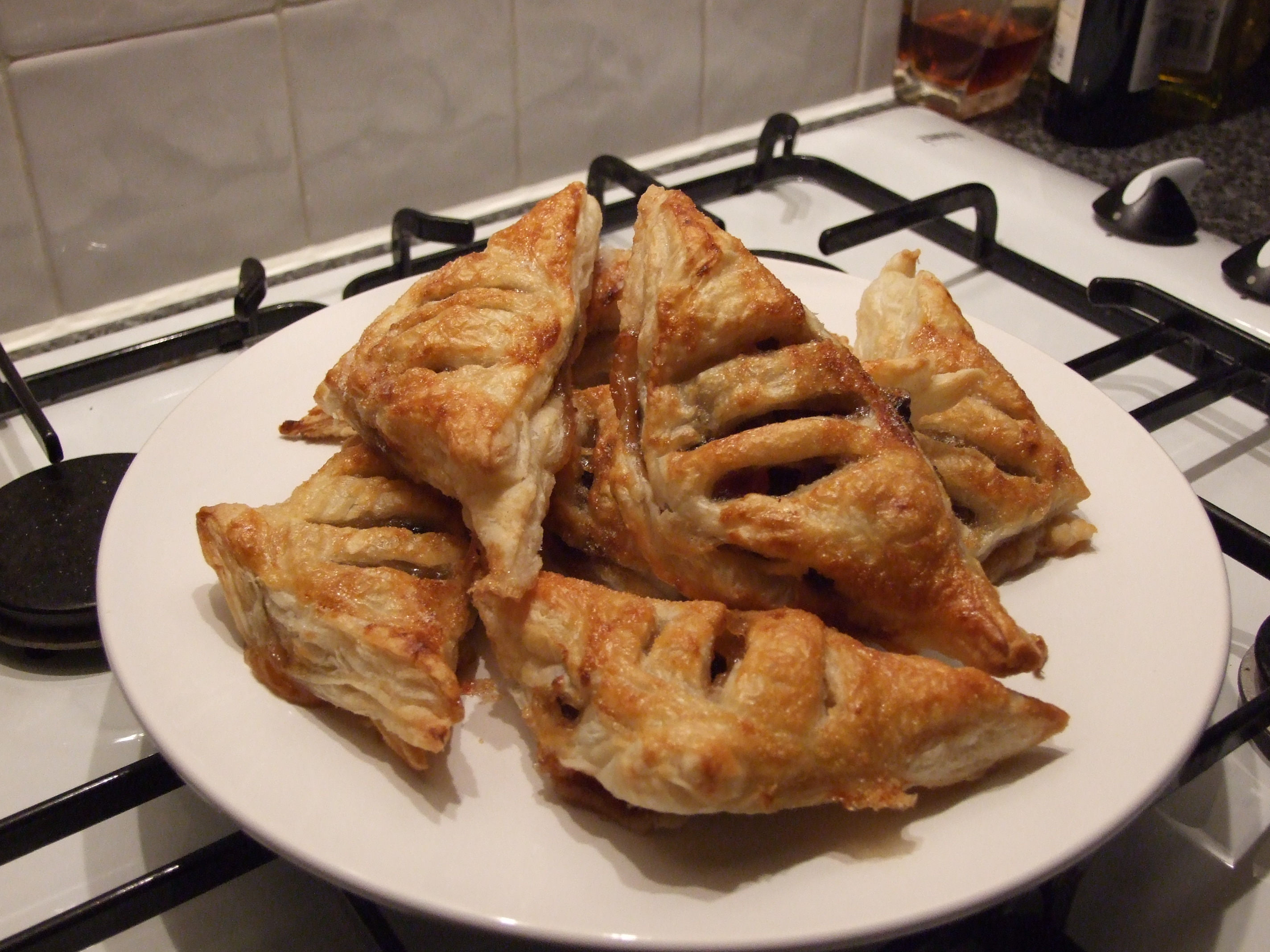
Coventry Godcakes

Coventry Godcakes are baked puff pastry turnover containing sweet mincemeat, which originate from the city of Coventry, England. They are in the form of a right-angled isosceles triangle, marked with three slits on the top and sprinkled with sugar. The triangular shape and the markings are said to be reference to the Holy Trinity.

Godcakes are a New Year tradition in the city, and are given by godparents to their godchildren along with a blessing for the year ahead.

In 2010, Leigh Waite, a local Blue Badge Tourist Guide with an interest in baking, was given a recipe by a local historian David McGrory. Leigh tried out the recipe, producing them to sell during the annual Heritage Open Weekend event in the city.

In August 2012, the Coventry Godcake was officially re-launched at a celebration event at Coventry Transport Museum attended by the Lord Mayor and guests, including the Coventry Mummers.

The triangles created in country lanes where three lanes meet derive their names from the Coventry Godcake. A triangle is created by the passing of farm vehicles, originally horse-drawn carts, as they turn. The so-called "god cakes", which are not particular to any one city or county, take their name from these triangular pastries.

== See also ==
- List of pastries
