= Cornulețe =

Stuffed Christmas pastry

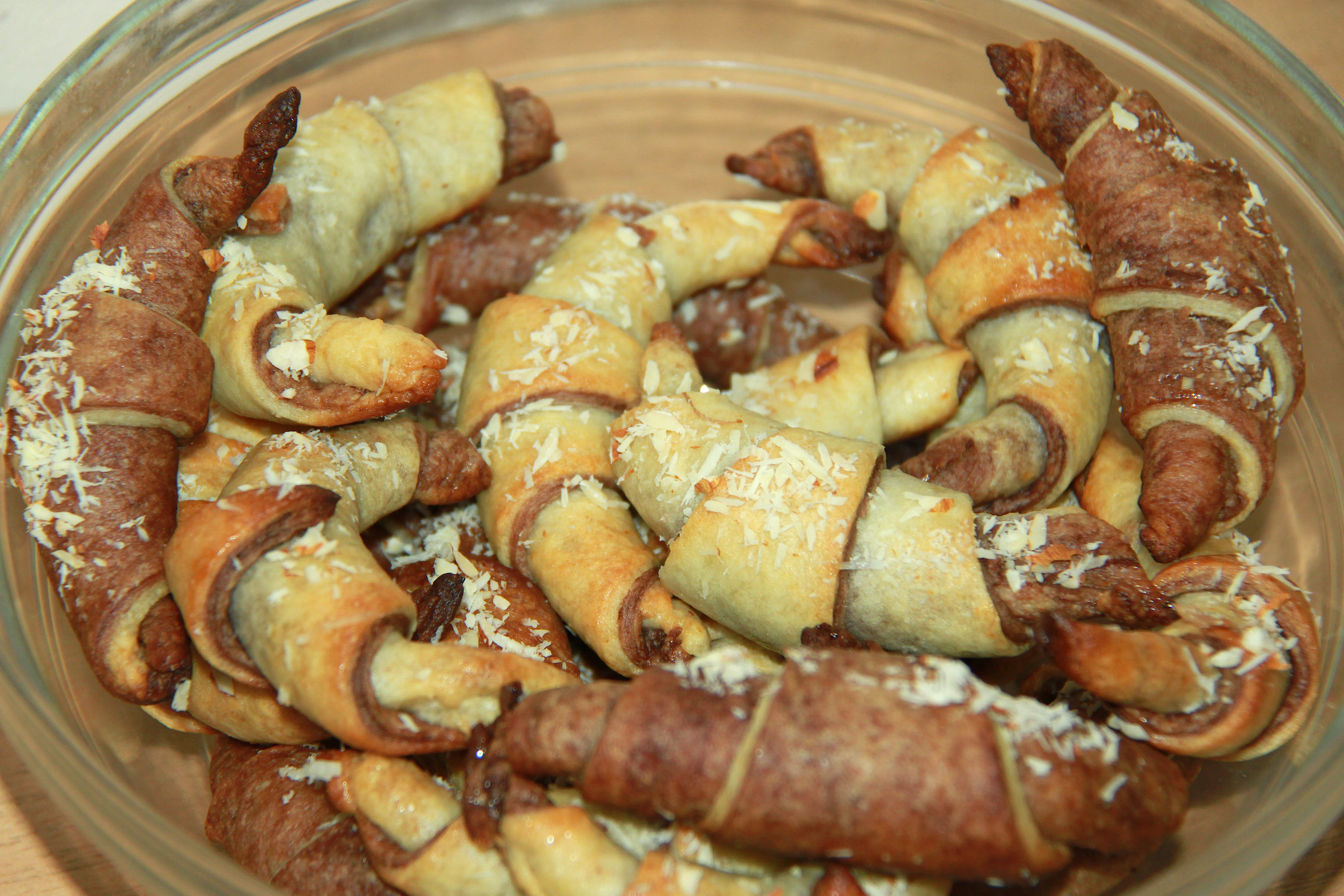
- Type: Pastry
- Course: Dessert
- Place of origin: Romania, Moldova
- Main ingredients: Turkish delight, jam or marmalade, chocolate, cinnamon sugar, walnuts, and/or raisins

Cornulețe are Romanian and Moldovan pastries aromatised with vanilla or rum extract/essence, as well as lemon rind, and stuffed with Turkish delight, jam, chocolate, cinnamon sugar, walnuts, and/or raisins, with the shape representing a crescent. They are traditionally eaten during Romanian holidays, especially during Christmas time, or other special occasions.

== See also ==
- List of pastries
