= Leningradsky cake =

Soviet pastry

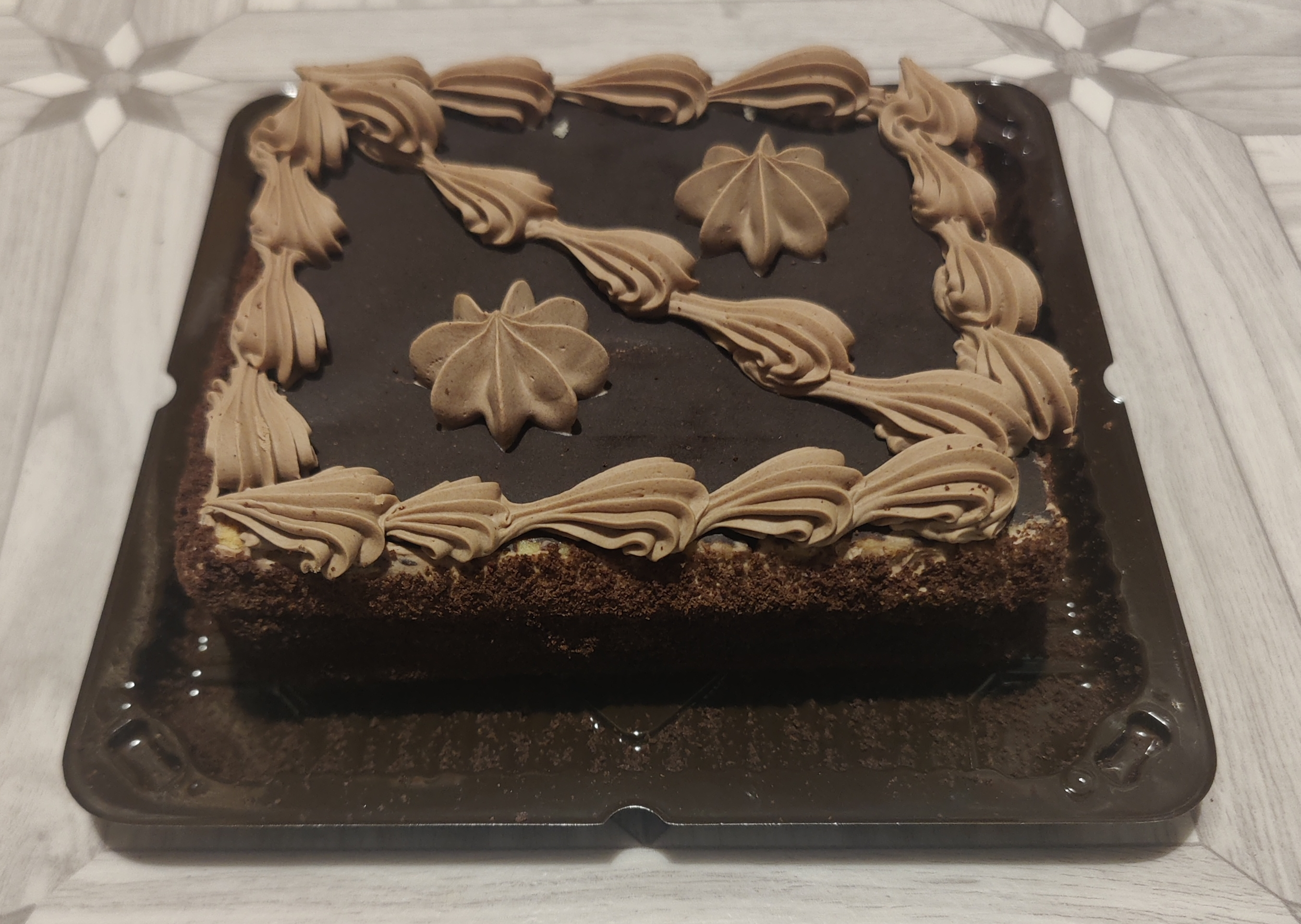

The Leningradsky cake is a Soviet pastry made of short-crust pastry, light chocolate buttercream, and cognac.

== Origins ==
In the 1950s, production of sweet masterpieces increased in the Soviet Union. Among these new creations was the Leningradsky cake. The cake was created by Victoria Lvovna Tatarskaya, who was (at the time), the recipe developer of the pastry shop located on the Nevsky Prospect in Leningrad (now Saint Petersburg). The shop was called "North" (in Russian "Север").

During Soviet times, the Leningradsky cake was called the "Russian Royal Cake" because it was made of shortbread, which was expensive at the time, and only affordable to wealthy or royal families.

== Composition ==
The original recipe requires the preparation of four thin layers of short-crust pastry coated with light chocolate buttercream and cognac. A chocolate fondant is used as a glaze for the top.

The cake is topped with roasted peanuts and toasted biscuit crumbs on the sides.

The original shape of the cake is square and its name (Leningradsky in Russian: "Ленинградский") was written on the top with buttercream.

== After 1991 ==
In 1991, the city of Leningrad was renamed St Petersburg and the cake lost its inscription on the top: only a few motifs remain written on the cake.

== See also ==
- List of pastries
- Soviet cuisine
