= Apfelküchle =

German battered and fried apple slices

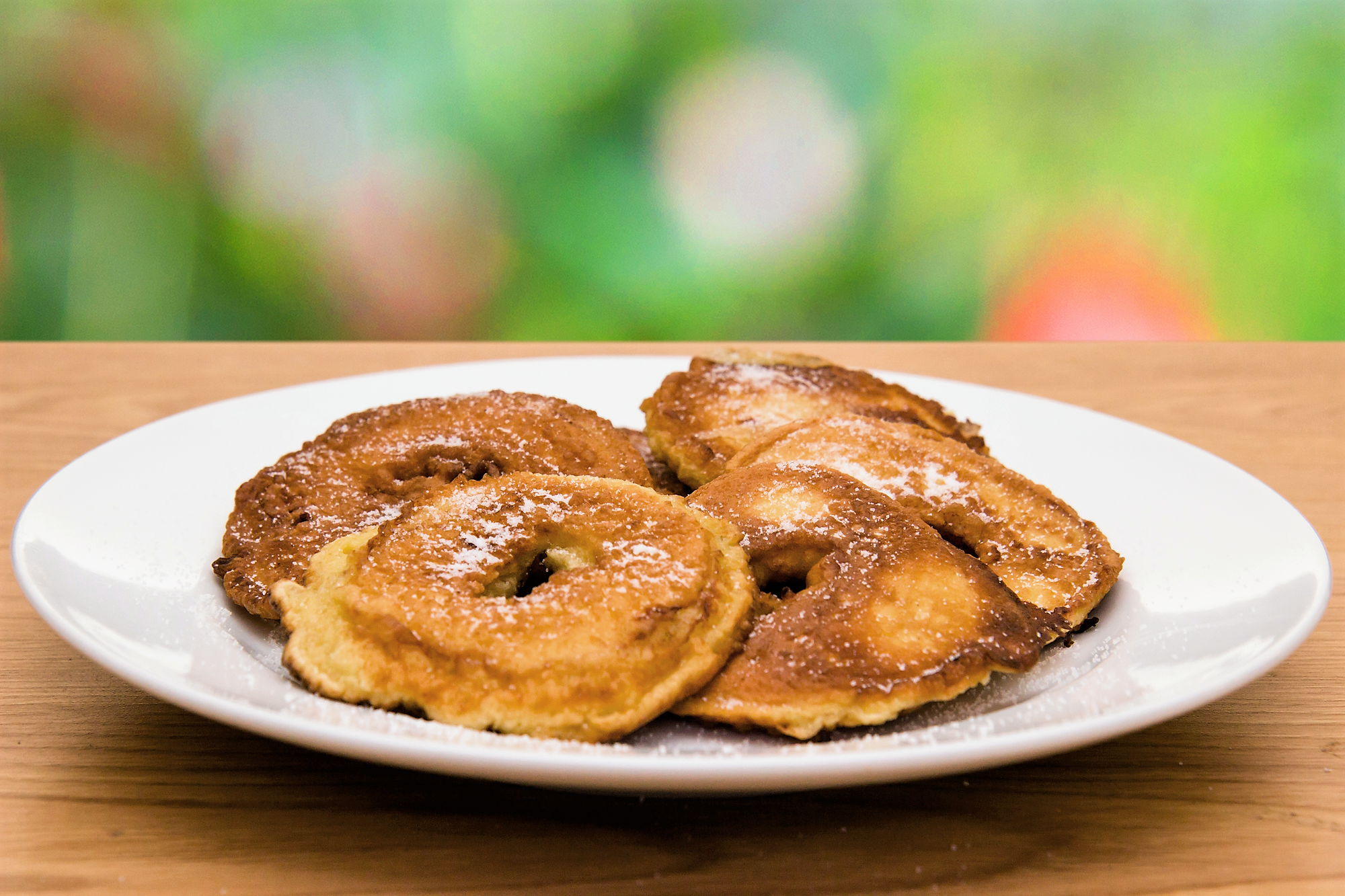
- Fresh Apfelküchle
- Place of origin: Baden-Württemberg, Germany
- Main ingredients: Apple, Flour, eggs, Milk

The Apfelküchle is a traditional German pastry, consisting of sliced apples dipped in batter and fried to a golden-brown color. It is popular in Baden-Württemberg, a federal state in southern Germany. The Apfelküchle has spread throughout Europe and the US. It is similar to an apple fritter but is made more like a pancake, and can be prepared in several ways. While it is traditionally eaten as a complete meal, because of its sweet taste, Apfelküchle has also become popular as a dessert.

== Etymology ==
The word Apfelküchle consists of two words: Apfel, meaning apple, and Küchle, a diminutive in Swabian German of Kuchen, meaning cake. A possible translation is little apple pie.

== History ==
It is not completely certain when Apfelküchle were first made, however it is known that the pastry was created in south-west Germany in the state of Baden-Württemberg, where it has been a long-standing traditional meal. Recently, Apfelküchle has spread beyond Germany's borders and has become very popular.

== Season ==
Apples do not tend to tolerate long storage through the colder seasons. Making Apfelküchle is a way to use the spare apples picked in the summer and early autumn. A large number of apples that would otherwise be wasted or were slightly damaged before they could be eaten (either en route to the vendor or damaged during harvest), can be used to make Apfelküchle.

=== Fat Thursday ===
Apfelküchle is traditionally eaten in Baden-Württemberg on Fat Thursday, the Thursday prior to Rose Monday (Carnival Monday), similar to eating paczki on Fat Tuesday. Apfelküchle is traditionally eaten as a main course, however in recent years it has often been served as a dessert. During Carnival, the Apfelküchle is a must. It is also part of every religious holiday in southern Germany.

== Preparation ==
=== Main ingredients ===
There are a few different ways to make Apfelküchle. Most recipes differ mainly in minor ingredients, which are swapped out based on personal taste. Apfelküchle all have a main ingredient of apples and dough (made from eggs, flour, sugar, salt, and milk). Different variations of dough can be made by adding extras such as beer, fruit brandy, and cinnamon.

=== Consumption ===
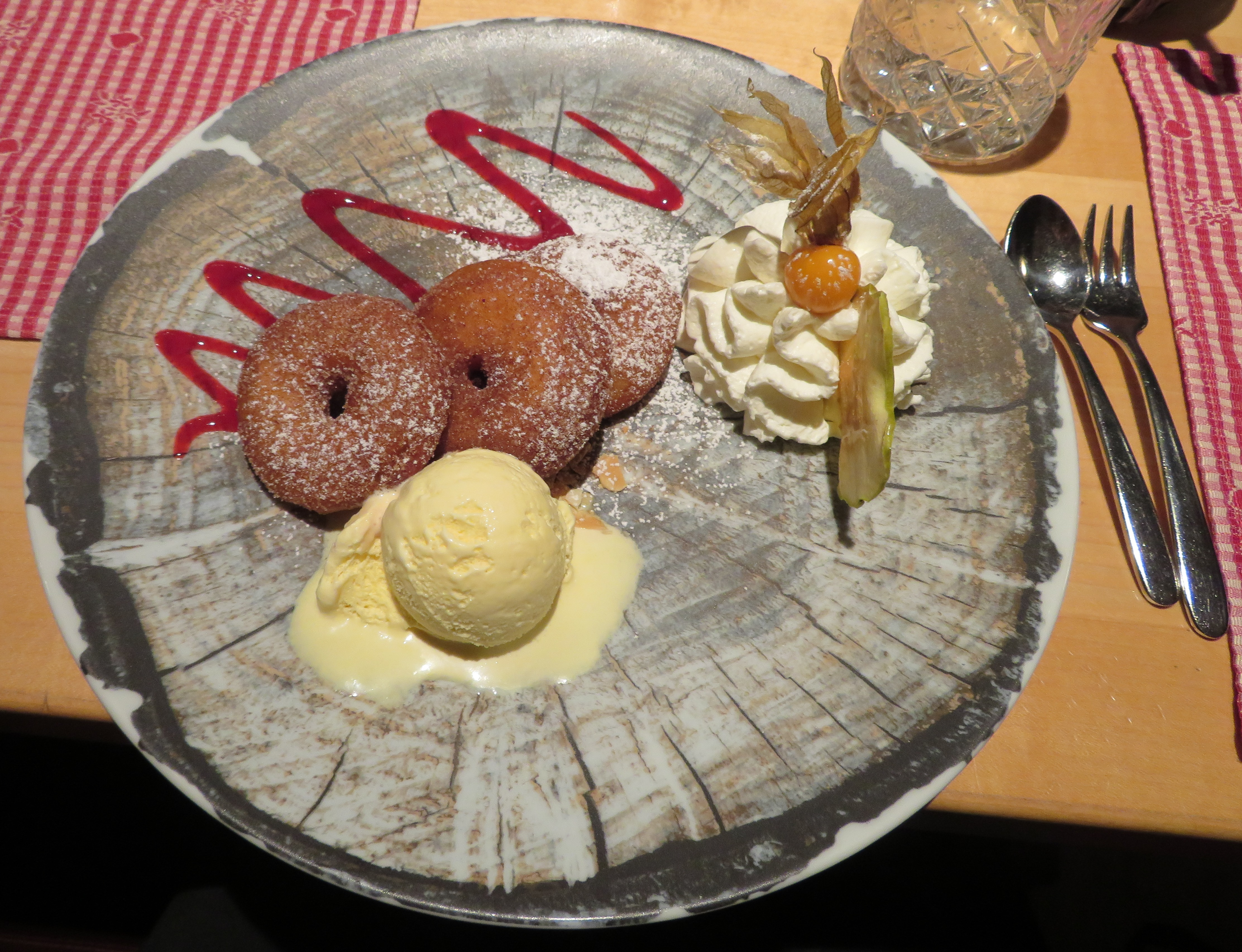
Apfelküchle with vanilla ice cream

Since the end of the 18th century, it has become common to use a variety of sauces to refine dishes in Baden-Württemberg. As a popular dish in that area, Apfelküchle is often served with its own variety of sauces and sides. The most common way to eat Apfelküchle is warm with cinnamon and sugar, or dusted with powdered sugar. One of the most popular refinements is to serve it cold with a vanilla sauce. It is also popular, especially among children, to serve Apfelküchle with vanilla ice cream. Cooks in Baden-Württemberg also like to flambé it with Grand Marnier or rum and serve it with a little scoop of vanilla ice cream. Another sauce used to dress Apfelküchle is Chaudeausauce, a French term for hot water, which is composed mainly of wine, vinegar, lemon juice, egg yolks and sugar. It is traditionally made with white wine; usually champagne, and occasionally with a shot of cognac or sherry. It can be enjoyed both hot and cold.

== See also ==
- List of pastries
- Apple dumplings
- German baked apples
