= Huff paste =

Cooking technique

- Type: Pastry
- Place of origin: England
- Main ingredients: Flour, suet, boiling water

Huff paste is a stiff pie shell (or coffyn) made using a mixture of flour, suet, and boiling water. The pastry when cooked creates a tough protective layer around the food inside. When cooked, the pastry is generally discarded as it is virtually inedible. However, the shell becomes soaked with the meat juices and historically was sometimes eaten by house servants after the meal had concluded.

Huff paste's main purpose is simply to create a solid container for the pie's ingredients. The flour itself is stronger than normal flour, often made from coarsely ground rye, and suet, which is mixed with hot water to create what was an early form of hot water crust pastry.

Huff paste can be moulded into a variety of shapes, called coffyns or coffers, similar to a Cornish pasty. A benefit of these early pies was that meat could be preserved for several months and the food contained within was protected from contamination. It also allowed food to be preserved so that country dwellers could send it over long distances as gifts to their friends in other towns or areas.

Shells of huff paste can also be baked empty, or "blind". After baking, the pastry is brushed with egg yolk to give it a golden color, and later filled with a mixture of meat and spices and then baked.

A dish from Wiltshire, called the Devizes pie, is layered forcemeat or offal cooked under a huff paste.

== See also ==
- Beef Wellington
- List of pastries
