= Ghunzakhi =

Pashtun cookie

Ghunzakhi (Pashto: غونزاخي), also known as khajoor (خجور), is a traditional cookie in Pashtun areas usually served to guests and to married sisters and daughters when they return to their husbands' homes after visiting family. The cookie is made from lightly leavened dough, which is prepared with sugar or gur, caramelized in oil or water, and mixed with flour, pinch or baking soda, and fennel seeds.

== See also ==
- List of pastries
