= Cream horn =

Donut filled with whipped cream

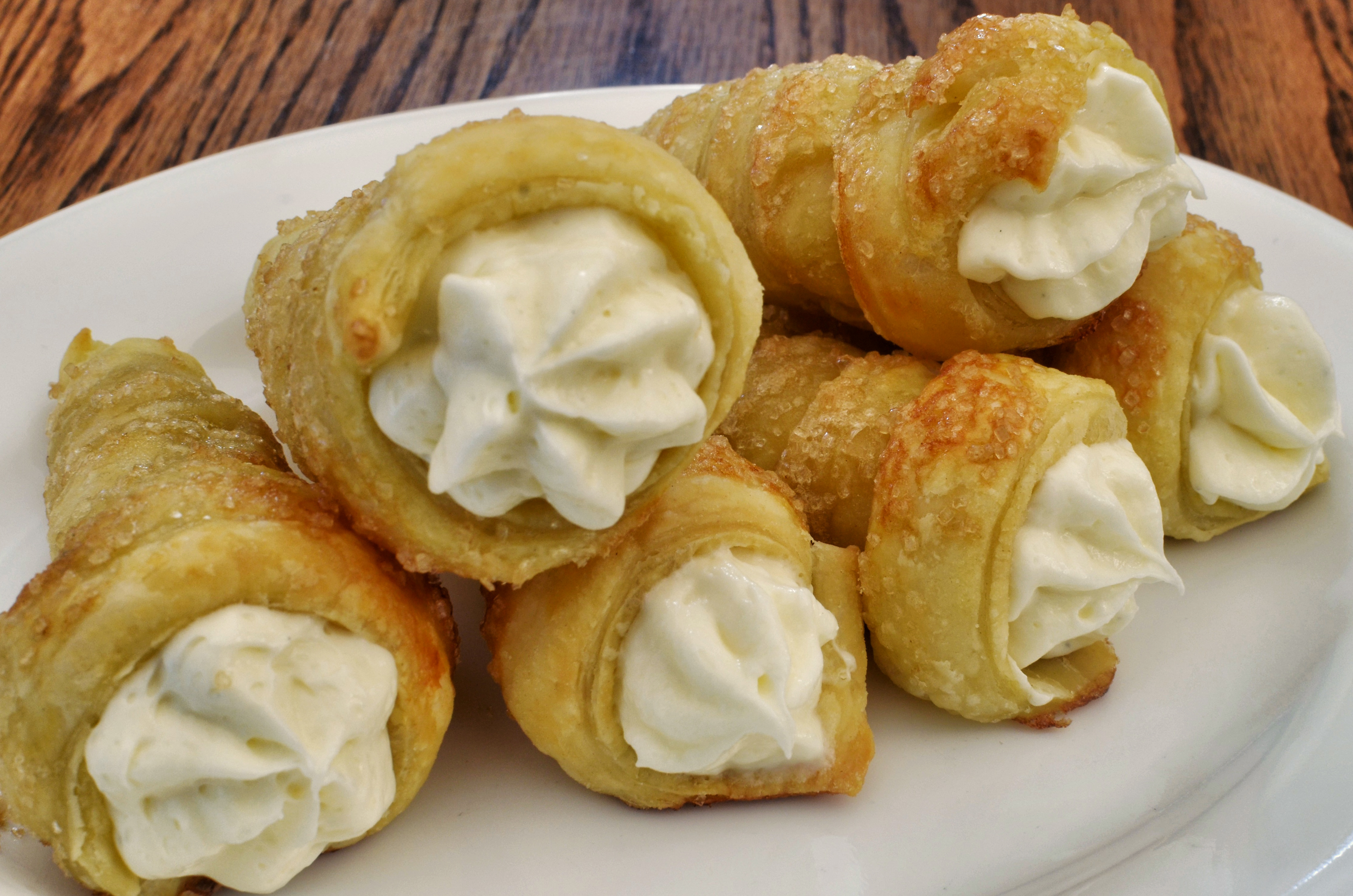
- Cream horns
- Type: Pastry
- Main ingredients: Flaky or puff pastry, whipped cream

A cream horn is a pastry made with flaky or puff pastry, and whipped cream. (An alternative version, the meringue horn, is made with meringue.)

The horn shape is made by winding overlapping pastry strips around a conical thin sheet metallic mold. After baking, a spoonful of jam or fruit is added and the pastry is then filled with whipped cream. The pastry can also be moistened and sprinkled with sugar before baking for a sweeter, crispier finish.

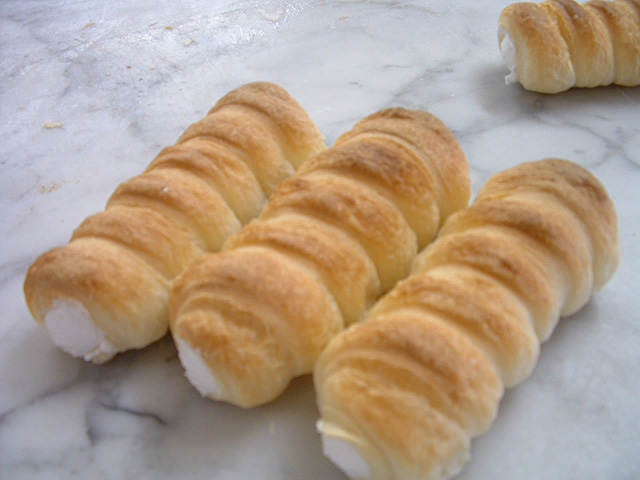
Austrian Schaumrollen

Cream horns are called cannoncini in Italy, kornedákia (Greek: κορνεδάκια) in Greece and Schaumrollen in Austria. In Pittsburgh, Pennsylvania, cream horns are called Lady Locks or clothespin cookies.

== See also ==
- List of pastries
- Cream tubes
- Corone (bread)
