= Schaumrolle =

Austrian confection

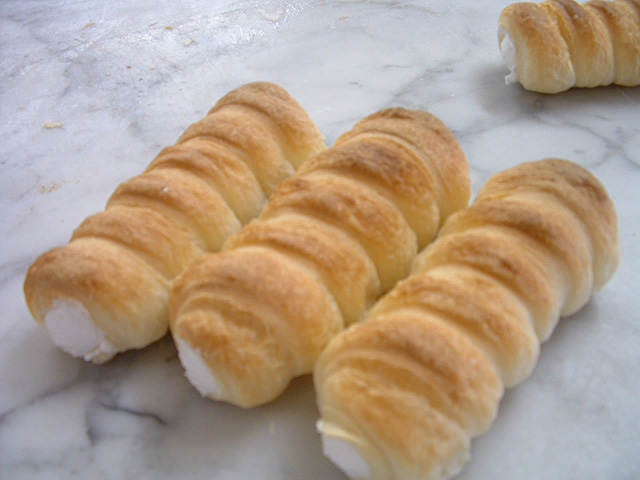
- Tube-shaped Schaumrollen
- Alternative names: Schillerlocke
- Type: Puff pastry
- Place of origin: Austria

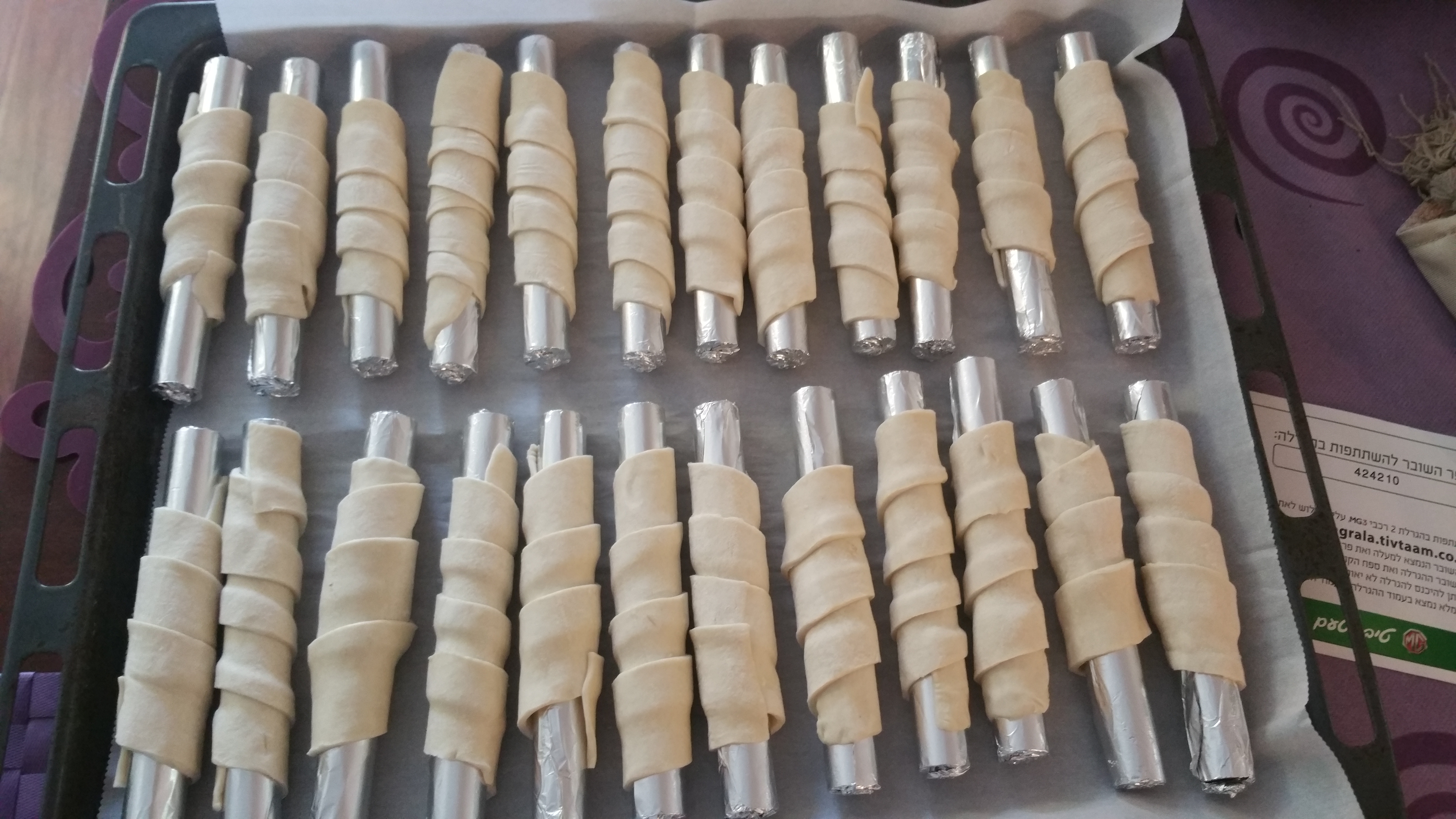
The making process of Schaumrolle

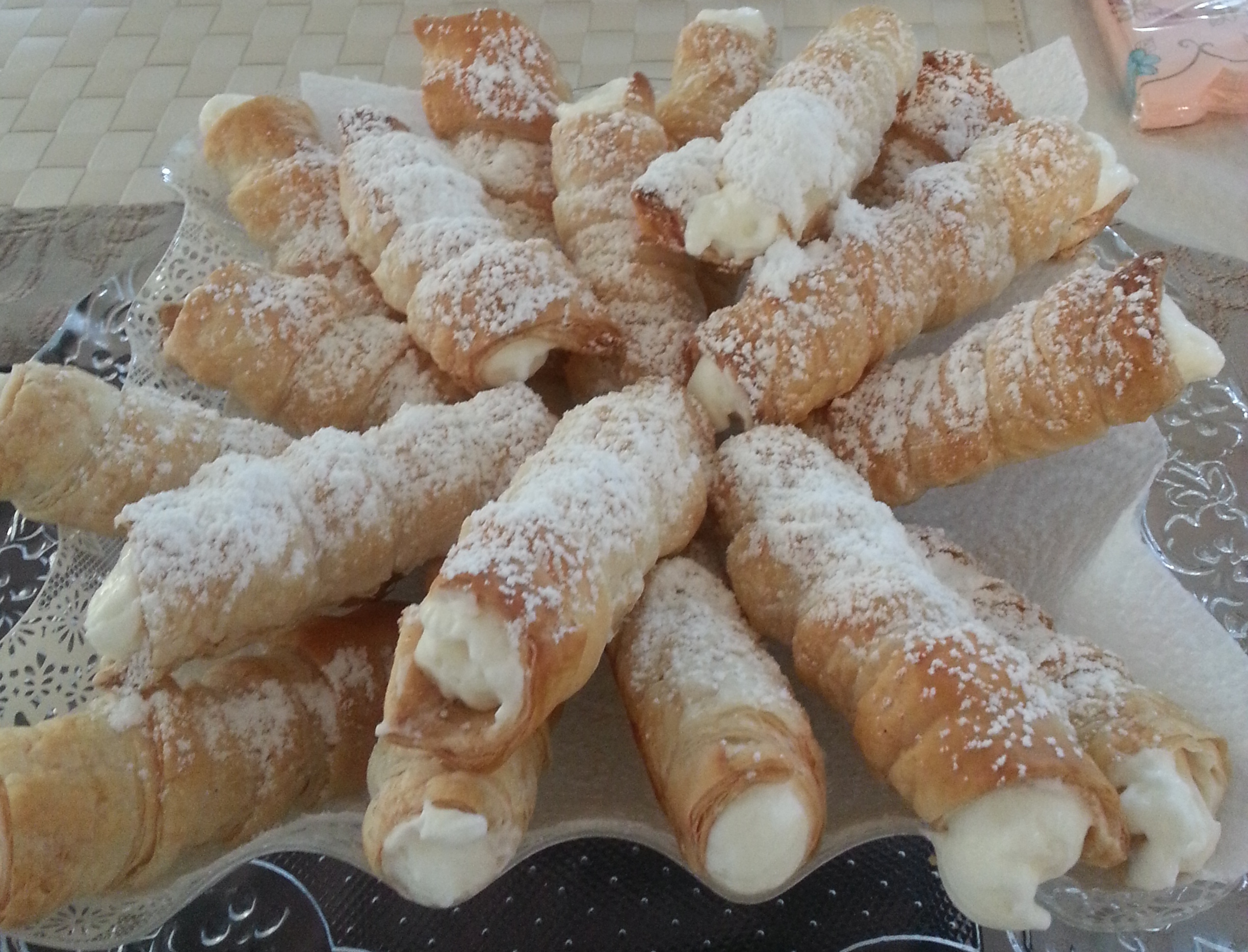
Ready to eat Schaumrolles

Schaumrollen, or Schillerlocken (German: [ˈʃɪlɐˌlɔkn̩]) (lit. foam rolls or Schiller's curls) are an Austrian and German confection. They consist of a cone or tube of puff pastry filled with whipped cream, Bavarian cream or meringue. The pastries are made by wrapping thin pastry strips around a cone shaped metal tube. After baking, they are filled with the "foam", which is usually sweetened whipped cream or meringue. The pastry tubes are often rolled in coarse sugar or powdered sugar before baking, for extra sweetness and a crunchy texture.

== History ==
This is a variety of a cream horn, which was brought to North America by Mennonites from the Austrian-Hungarian Empire. Also popular with immigrants from the Danube region (such as the Danube Swabians), Schaumrollen or Schillerlocken can be made up to five inches long, and are served as a treat on major holidays such as Christmas, as well as at weddings and first Communion celebrations. In Austria, they are consumed throughout the year as a treat or afternoon snack, alongside a cup of coffee.

== Nutritional information ==
Like many pastries, this dessert is high in calories; an Austrian Schaumrolle is estimated to have almost 200 calories per single piece, of which 46 percent are fats, and 49 percent carbohydrates.

== Name of the dessert ==
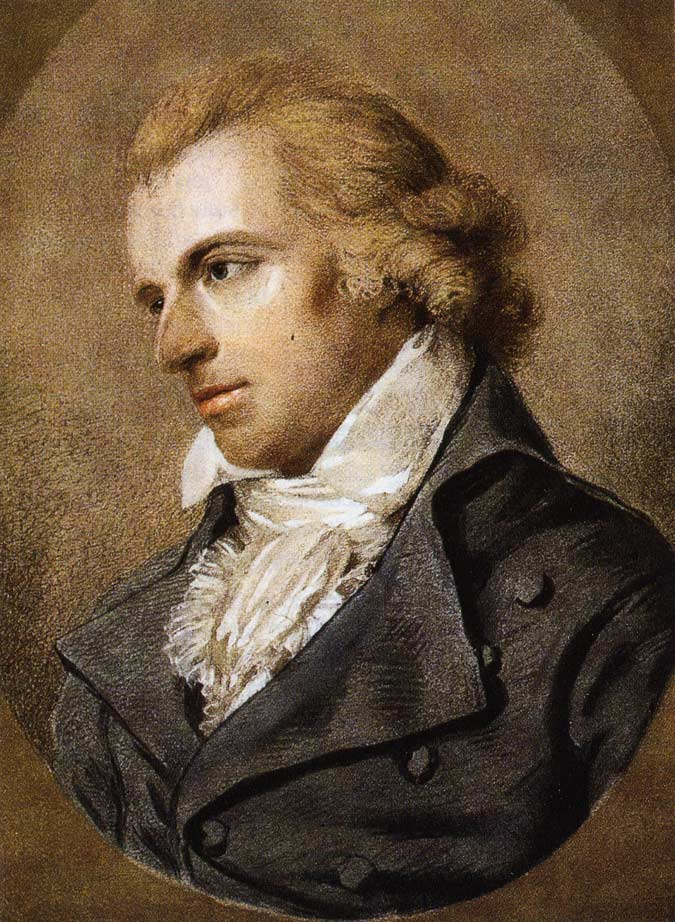
Portrait of Friedrich Schiller by Ludovike Simanowiz. His golden locks of hair inspired a popular name for the pastry.

Schillerlocke, the alternate name for the pastry, goes back to Anton Graff's Portrait of Friedrich Schiller. The portrait shows poet Friedrich Schiller with his blond curls in relatively casual pose sitting at a table. This portrait, which is now located in Dresden in the Kügelgenhaus, was often copied and found widespread use as a copper engraving, which led to the emergence of the naming of the pastry in popular culture.

In Germany, Schillerlocke also refers to smoked dogfish belly flaps.

== See also ==
- List of foods named after people
- List of pastries
- Cream horn
- Cream tubes
- Mille-feuille
- Sachertorte
- Vol-au-vent
- Blintz
