= Komaj sehen =

Iranian pastry

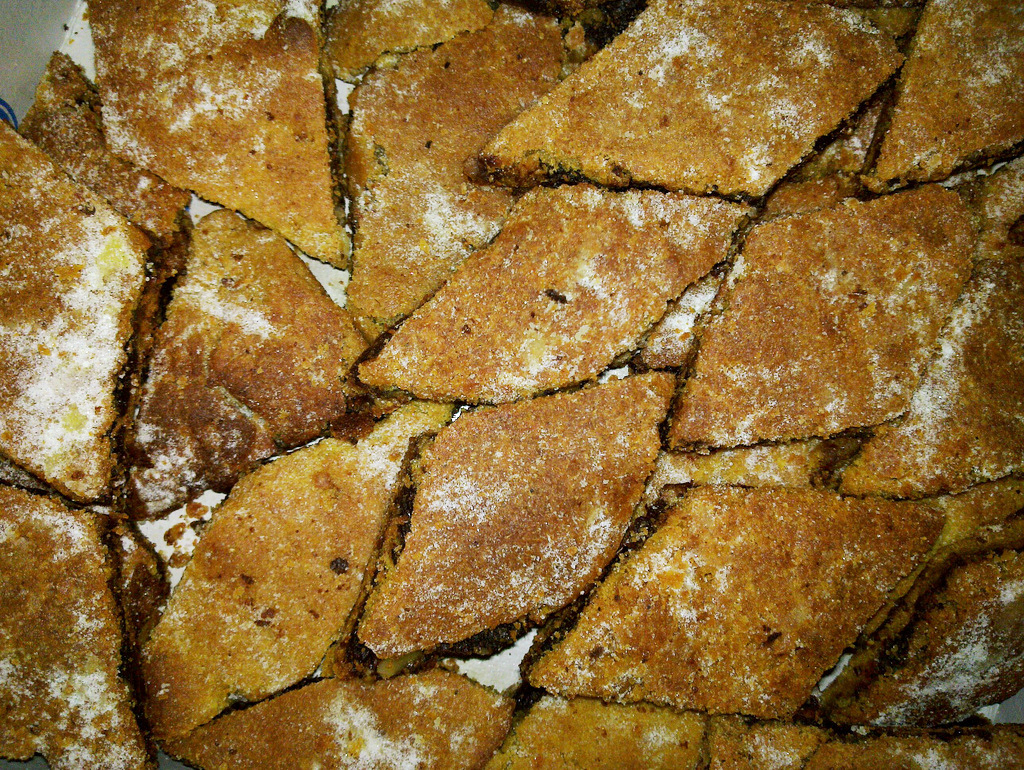
- Komaj sehen
- Type: Pastry
- Place of origin: Iran

Komaj Sehen is a type of pastry specific to the Kerman Province of Iran. For baking, Wheat sprout flour is mixed with regular flour such as wheat flour to make the dough. Before cooking, dates and walnuts, almonds or pistachio mixed with spices such as clove and fennel seeds are placed in the middle layers of the paste. The sweets are prepared without additive sugar and preservatives, yet the pastry can keep for a long time out of the refrigerator. Due to the very high-calorie ingredients in the pastry, eating a piece of it with a glass of milk provides a feeling of satiety. In Turkey, Shahin Kurabiyesi is made of dough, dates, almonds, walnuts, pistachioes, and sugar.

== See also ==
- List of pastries
