= Blind-baking =

Baking a pie crust or other pastry without the filling

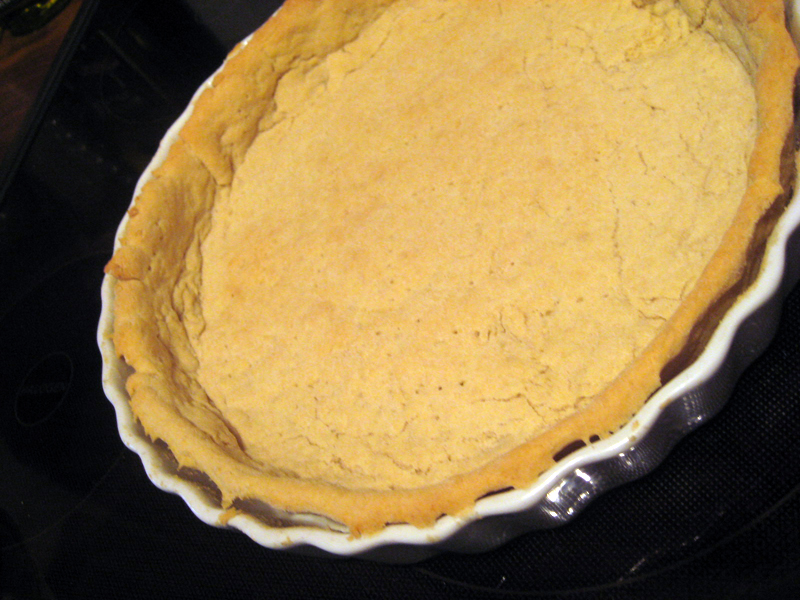
Pie shell after blind baking

Baking blind (sometimes called pre-baking) is the process of baking a pie crust or other pastry without the filling. Blind baking a pie crust is necessary when it will be filled with an unbaked filling (such as with pudding or cream pies), in which case the crust must be fully baked. It is also called for if the filling has a shorter bake time than the crust, in which case the crust is partly baked. Blind baking is also used to keep pie crust from becoming soggy due to a wet filling.

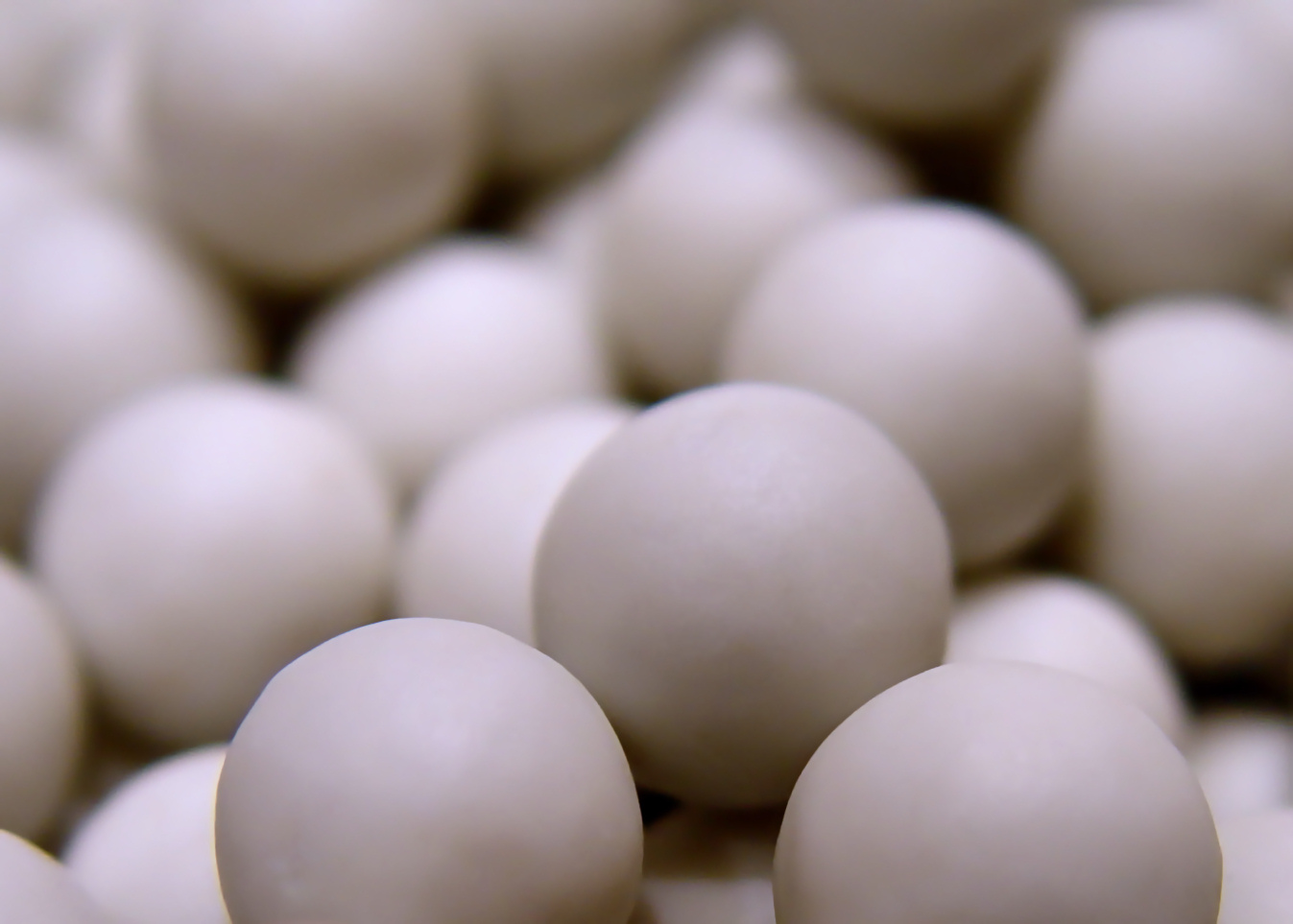
A close-up photograph of ceramic pie weights

Blind baking can be accomplished by different methods.

In one technique, the pie crust is lined with aluminium foil or parchment paper, then filled with pastry- or pie weights (sometimes called "baking beans") to ensure the crust retains its shape while baking. Pie-weights are available as ceramic or metal beads, but rice, dried peas, lentils, "baking beans", or other pulses can be used instead. When using this method for a fully baked crust, the weights are removed before the pre-baking is complete in order to achieve a browned crust. Weights are chosen that conduct heat, are not damaged during baking, and are heavy enough to prevent anything moving in the oven.

Another technique dispenses with weights by placing a second pie tin on top of the crust, then inverting the tins to bake. In this method, the crust browns between the tins. A further simplified technique involves piercing the crust repeatedly with the tines of a fork to produce small holes, allowing steam to escape and preventing the crust from bubbling up, but that does not work with soft doughs such as pâte sucrée.

== See also ==
- Huff paste
- Pie bird
- Parbaking
