= Chasan (pastry) =

Traditional Chinese pastry dish

- Type: Pastry
- Place of origin: China
- Region or state: Jiangsu
- Main ingredients: flour, sesame oil

Chasan (Chinese: 茶馓; pinyin: chásǎn) is a traditional Chinese pastry that is popular in Jiangsu Province, China, and especially in Huai'an, a historic city which is considered the home of chasan.

== Description ==
Chasan is golden brown and crispy. Chasan is made by rolled wirelike strips. Usually, chasan has a variety of shapes, such as comb, chrysanthemum and pagoda.

Chasan is a kind of afternoon tea snack and that is why it is so named, as "Cha" means tea. Huai'an Chasan has a long history of over one hundred years. It has been served since the late Qing Dynasty, and is known both at home and abroad. It used to be a royal tribute during the Qing dynasty, and later was designated one of the "Famous Chinese Snacks" in 1997 for its peculiar flavour.

=== Ingredients ===
- Flour
- Sesame oil
- Refined salt
- Yeast powder

== Ways of eating ==
Some ways chasan is consumed include:

- Made into soup, especially sponge gourd soup
- Eaten along with tea
- Steeped into hot water with soft sugar or soya-bean milk
- Added into a fried dish

== Legend of Chasan ==
Long long ago, a corrupt official was sent to collect money and grain for the government. But he just made a pig of himself. When he passed Shan Yang (ancient Huai'an) county, he had a miraculous dream. In his dream, a golden phoenix landed at the top of Zhenhuai Lou with a most delicate Sanzi (predecessor of Chasan) in its mouth. Someone told him that the phoenix was an immortal phoenix and if one could get the most delicate Sanzi in its mouth, he would live forever. When he woke up, he planned to make his dream a peg to collect wealth for himself. So he ordered his subordinates to seek for the golden phoenix, or else they would be punished and fined.

Of course, the subordinates could not find a golden phoenix. Finally, they seized an old man who made Sanzi for a living and told the corrupt official that the golden phoenix was hidden by the old man. The official forced the old man to hand over the phoenix and the most delicate Sanzi before dawn, otherwise, his family would all be sentenced to death. The old man could do nothing but wait for death. His grandchild called Jinfeng comforted him that she could save her family. When dawn came, Jinfeng carried a handful of Chasan and jumped into a well. Suddenly, she turned into a golden phoenix and flew to the corrupt official. The official was eating and drinking. The phoenix dived suddenly and pecked out his eyes. Then the golden phoenix turned into the most delicate Sanzi, and people called it Chasan.

== See also ==
- List of pastries
