= Communist bandit pastry =

Taiwanese pastry named after an anti-communist epithet

Communist Bandit Pastries
- Type: Pastry
- Place of origin: Taiwan
- Region or state: Chiayi County
- Main ingredients: Wheat flour, pork, cabbage, carrot, egg, peanut, sesame
- Variations: Savory, sweet

Mainland Sister Communist Bandit Pastries (Chinese: 大陸姐共匪餅; pinyin: Dàlù jiě gòngfěi bǐng) are a type of Taiwanese pastry sold in Chiayi City, Taiwan, with a second brand in Taoyuan. The snack is named after the term "communist bandit" (Chinese: 共匪), an anti-communist epithet that the Kuomintang had used refer to the Chinese Communist Party. The owner of a Chiayi store who came up with the name had immigrated from China after having married a Taiwanese. After her customers laughingly called her both a communist bandit and a Mainland sister, thus becoming the full name for the shop "Mainland Sister Communist Bandit Pastries."

The pastry is made with a combination of pan-frying and deep-frying, filled with cabbage, carrots, glass noodles, and a soft-boiled egg. There is also a thinner and longer sweet version, hollow with no filling, but has the aroma of peanuts and sesame seeds.

== See also ==
- Taiwanese cuisine
- History of Taiwan (1945–present)
- Anti-communism
- Martial law in Taiwan
