= María Mestayer de Echagüe =

Gourmet, Spanish writer and entrepreneur

María Mestayer de Echagüe (20 December 1877 – 19 November 1949), commonly known by her pen name, the Marquesa de Parabere, was a basque gastronome, food writer and businesswoman.

Author of several recipe books and culinary studies, she became one of the best-known household names in post-war Spain thanks to the large number of reprints of her book La cocina completa, which is regarded as one of the most influential Spanish recipe books of the 20th century.

== Childhood and youth ==
María Mestayer was born on 20 December 1877 in Bilbao, and was baptised on 7 January 1878 in the parish church of San Vicente Mártir de Abando as María Manuela Eugenia Carolina Mestayer Jacquet. Her parents were the French businessman and diplomat Eugenio Mestayer Demelier and the Bilbao-born María Jacquet la Salle (or Delasalle), also of French origin, daughter of a famous Bilbao banker, Carlos Jacquet.

A few years after her birth, her father was appointed to the French consulate in Seville, where Maria spent part of her childhood and adolescence. Thanks to her family's good social and economic position, she enjoyed a careful cosmopolitan education. A keen reader and history buff, she travelled with her parents all over Europe, visiting the great capitals and the best restaurants of the time, such as that of Auguste Escoffier. Back in Bilbao, she met the lawyer and member of San Sebastián high society Ramón Echagüe Churruca, whom she married on 12 October 1901 in the Basilica of Begoña. They had eight children together.

== Career ==
=== Culinary vocation ===
Cultured and refined but inexperienced in managing a household, Mestayer realised shortly after getting married that her husband preferred to eat at his club in the Sociedad Bilbaína rather than at home. Spurred on by this and by her own inclination for good food, she began to read voraciously gastronomic publications such as "Le Pot-au-feu" (1893–1956) and to experiment in the kitchen. Gradually she went from being an amateur to an expert in gastronomy thanks to her readings and the correspondence she maintained with some of the most famous chefs of her time: Henri-Paul Pellaprat, José Rondissoni and especially with Teodoro Bardají, head chef of the Duke of Infantado, whom she met through her husband.

She began to give cooking and baking courses in Bilbao to the women of Catholic Action in the neighbouring parish of San Vicente de Abando, in the school of El Sagrado Corazón and in organisations promoting female education such as the Emakume Abertzale Batza, a women's association of the Basque Nationalist Party. The climate of revolution at the beginning of the century made it possible for a woman like María Mestayer to break the limits attributed to her sex and social class and begin to write about cooking professionally.

=== The Marquesa de Parabere ===
As her reputation as a gastronome grew, she started writing for local newspapers, first under the pseudonym of Maritxu, and from 1929 onwards under the pen name of the Marchioness of Parabere (sp. Marquesa de Parabere). She wrote for a varied range of publications, including the Bilbao sports paper Excelsior, the daily El Diario Vasco, or the Argentine newspaper La Nación, and in specialised magazines such as El Gorro Blanco, La Revista Culinaria and Menage.

It is not entirely clear why Mestayer adopted her pen-name of marchioness of Parabere. At the time, the marquisate of Parabère, a French title, was actively claimed by a distant cousin to her husband, Joaquín Aguirre Echagüe, but the claim had never received official recognition. It has been suggested that she adopted the pen-name at the behest of friends such as Ramón de la Sota and Pedro Eguillor, or through affinity and even family relationship with Marie-Madeleine de Parabère, mistress of Philip II of Orleans. In any case, and despite the fact that many people treated her as a true blue-blooded marchioness, María Mestayer never corrected anyone of their mistake nor explained in detail the origins of this pseudonym.

=== Recipes and books ===
Encouraged by her friends, Mestayer published her first book in Bilbao, Confitería y Repostería (1930). In 1933 the publishing house of Espasa-Calpe published La Enciclopedia Culinaria, (Culinary Encyclopaedia) composed of the sweet recipes of her previous book plus other savoury recipes compiled under the title La Cocina Completa. From 1940 onwards, the work was divided into two volumes, a format it has maintained since. This two volume work is the most reprinted Spanish recipe book of the 20th century. Her recipes reflect the tastes of the basque bourgeoisie of the time, heavily influenced by both French and English cuisines. Thus, her book reports both classic Basque and Spanish recipes alongside basque adaptations of international recipes. This is particularly true in the second volume of her Culinary Encyclopaedia, devoted to puddings and desserts, which collect a varied range of specialties of her own home city alongside French and English recipes, showcasing the cultural prestige England held in Bilbao at the time.

Mestayer devoted her next book entirely to Basque cuisine, Platos escogidos de la Cocina Vasca, (Selected dishes of Basque Cuisine) published by Grijelmo in Bilbao in 1935. This book is almost lost, as most copies burnt during the Spanish Civil War. In 1936 she signed for the Barcelona publishing house Hymsa the recipe book Entremeses, aperitifs and salads on hors d'oeuvres and appetizers. Shortly afterwards he published Conservas caseras under the same imprint.

Her fondness for history led her to write a History of Gastronomy (1943), a journey through the historical evolution of cuisine. In 1947 she compiled a small pamphlet for the baking powder brand Royal, a small pamphlet with her best baking recipes.

=== The restaurant Parabere ===
With the money from an inheritance and in the face of her husband's opposition, Maria Mestayer decided in 1935 to open a high-class restaurant. At the age of 58, she left her husband in Bilbao and travelled to Madrid with two of her sons to set up the Parabere in Calle Cádiz (number 9, corner of Espoz y Mina), very close to the Puerta del Sol.

Sumptuously decorated in art deco style, the restaurant opened in March 1936 and was a resounding success among Madrid high society. The outbreak of the Spanish Civil War in the summer of the same year resulted in the seizure of the business by the CNT, the hospitality sectors' anarchist trade union. The Parabere remained open as an establishment where personalities sympathetic to the Republican cause would be entertained. Under the strict supervision of anarchist militiamen, the so-called comrade Marquesa hosted artists, politicians, diplomats and journalists such as Indalecio Prieto, Ernest Hemingway, Joseph P. Kennedy, Rafael Alberti or André Malraux.

The fall of Madrid to Franco's troops marked the demise of the Parabere. Once the war was over, she moved premises to the Calle Villanueva, in the barrio de Salamanca, and re-opened it in 1940. However, the bad economic situation of the country, the rationing, the lack of supplies and the compulsory single course made it difficult for the new restaurant to take off. She was forced to close it down definitively in 1943, when the restaurant got implicated in a political scandal involving messages sent from prison in food boxes; Mestayer was spared from prosecution only thanks to the intervention of several government officials that had patronised her restaurant.

Ill with diabetes, Maria Mestayer continued to work until the time of her death on what was to be her most complete and ambitious work, a Great Culinary Encyclopaedia in twelve volumes covering all the gastronomic knowledge available at the time. She was only able to complete five (so far, unpublished) before she died of a diabetic coma in Madrid on 19 November 1949, shortly before his 72nd birthday.

== Work ==
- Confitería y repostería, 1930
- La cocina completa, 1933
- Platos escogidos de la cocina vasca, 1935
- Entremeses, aperitivos y ensaladas, 1936
- Conservas caseras, 1936
- Historia de la gastronomía (esbozos), 1943
- Pastelería Royal, 1947
