= Pastry heart =

Heart-shaped puff pastry dessert

- A pastry heart frosted with white icing.
- Type: Pastry
- Place of origin: United States
- Region or state: Buffalo, New York
- Main ingredients: Puff pastry, white sugar icing

A pastry heart is a regional dessert item found in the Western New York area, with Buffalo credited as the place where it was first created.

The pastry heart is a heart-shaped flaky puff pastry, similar to a palmier, that is usually topped with white sugar icing that has a hard shell but is soft on the inside.

== History ==
The oldest known mention of a pastry heart is in an edition of the Amherst Bee in December 1884, describing a “mammoth pastry heart” which was frosted and inscribed “Merry Christmas and Happy New Year.” The pastry heart was provided to the editors at the Amherst Bee by the Buehl Brothers, Edward and Robert Buehl, who ran a series of “wholesale and retail grocery and provision stores” near the East Side of Buffalo at the time of the article's publication.

Pastry hearts were mentioned in local newspapers throughout the 1900s in department stores and grocery store advertisements. The pastry continues to be sold by chain stores in the Western New York area, including Wegmans and Tops, and by locally owned bakeries in the area, such as Eileens Centerview Bakery, Kith & Kin Bakeshop and McDuffie's Bakery.

== See also ==
- Buffalo wings
- Garbage Plate
- Grape pie
- Loganberry drink
- Texas hots
