= Cream tubes =

Bread roll filled with pastry cream

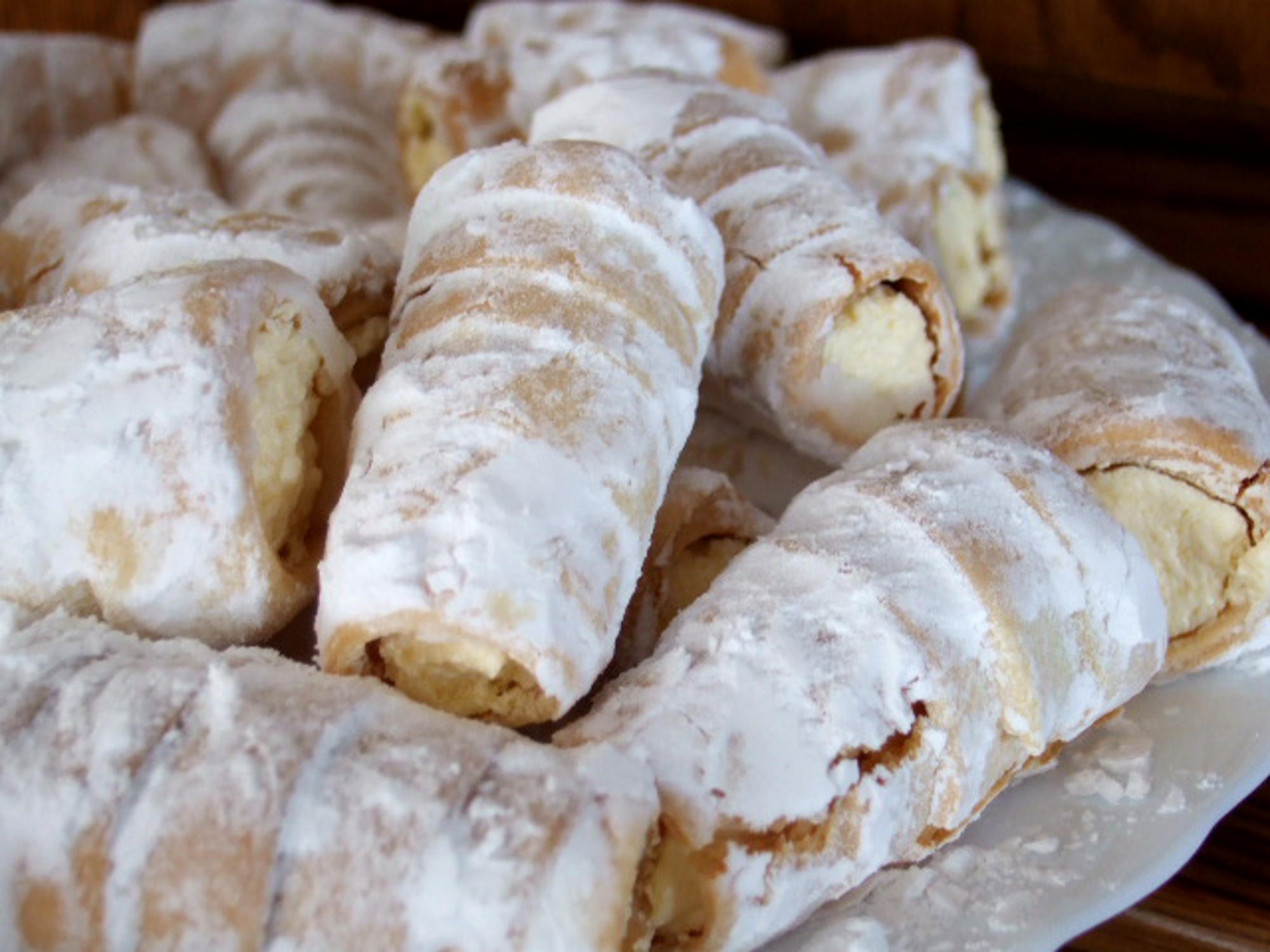
- Rurki z kremem
- Type: Viennoiserie
- Place of origin: Bulgaria, Poland, Romania, Russia
- Main ingredients: Yeast-leavened dough, butter

Cream tubes (Bulgarian: фунийки с крем, Romanian: Rulouri, Russian: Трубочки с кремом, Polish: Rurki z kremem) is a buttery, flaky viennoiserie bread roll, filled with pastry cream. Rosemary is sometimes added to the cream to flavour it.

They can be made from layered yeast-leavened dough. The dough is layered with butter, rolled and folded several times in succession, then rolled into a sheet, in a technique called laminating. The process results in a layered, flaky texture, similar to a puff pastry.

One 17th century recipe involved baking the Cream Tubes as wafers and rolling them into shape once cooked.

In Poland, cream tubes are often sold through kiosks and small street food stalls.

== See also ==
- Cream horn
- Schlotfeger (Gebäck)
- Cannoli
- Schaumrolle
