= Mandryky =

Ukrainian pastry

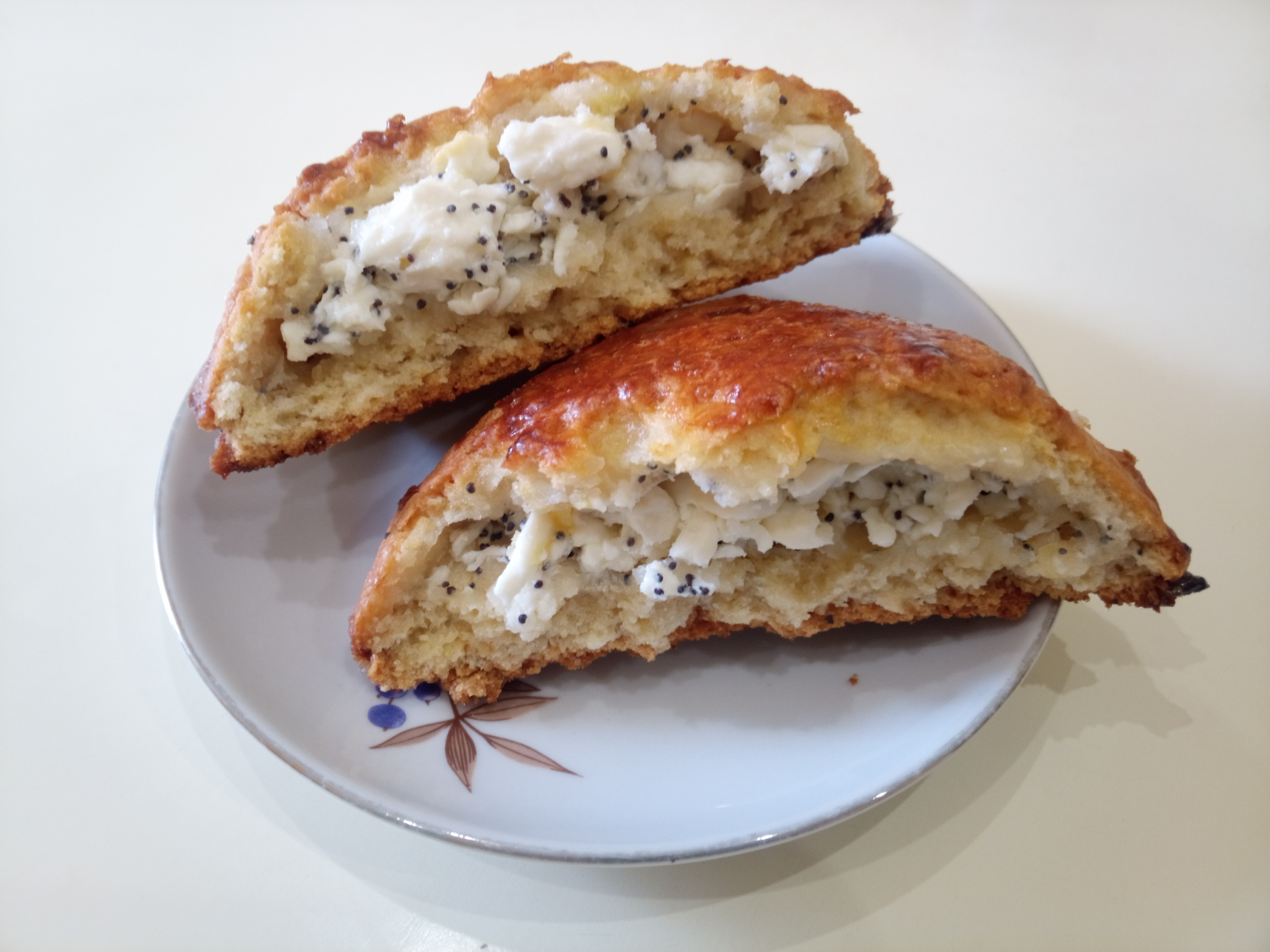
A mandryka with visible filling

Mandryky (Ukrainian: мандрики; singular: mandryka, мандрика) is a traditional Ukrainian pastry filled with cottage cheese/quark.

== Name ==
The dish received its name from the Polish term małdrzyk, which originally denoted a measure of grain. However, according to folk etymology, the name of mandryky derives from the travels (Ukrainian: мандри, romanized: mandry) of apostles Peter and Paul.

== History ==
First mentioned during the 16th century, mandryky could be originally used as a way of preserving cheese during warm periods, and served as a traditional dish on the Feast of Saints Peter and Paul. On that day, mandryky would be given as presents to herdsmen, and in Poltava region that tradition survived into the late 19th century. During the 18th century, a common way of preparing mandryky was to mix cheese with sour cream and dry the mixture, or boil it in milk. With time, that dish evolved into a pastry with cheese filling.

== Ingredients ==
Traditionally, mandryky would be made from wheat dough with the addition of buttermilk, whey, cheese and eggs.

== In culture ==
Mandryky are mentioned in several classical works of Ukrainian literature, among others Ivan Kotliarevsky's Eneida and Hryhorii Kvitka-Osnovianenko's The Witch of Konotop.
