= Devizes pie =

English pie dish

- Type: Pie
- Place of origin: United Kingdom
- Region or state: Devizes
- Invented: 15th century
- Main ingredients: Offal, huff paste

Devizes pie is a dish closely associated with the town of Devizes, Wiltshire, England. It is a pie which consists of offal within a huff paste casing. It was thought to originate from the 15th century, but fell out of fashion several times. It was first rediscovered in the 1950s and 1960s, and again in 2006. Some modern recipes have replaced the majority of the offal with other proteins.

== History ==
Probably created in the 15th century, the Devizes pie consists of offal, such as calf head, cooked in a case of hard huff paste. It is associated with the town of Devizes, Wiltshire. The details of the dish had supposedly been lost for generations—although it appears in a recipe book of 1830—until a recipe was discovered in the 1960s and the dish was then served in the Bear Hotel in Devizes for several years.

Florence White offers some detailed information on the pie in Good Things in England (1932) and dates the recipe she includes to 1836, from The Magazine of Domestic Economy. A boiled calf's head is cut into thin strips and layered with some of the brains, as well as slices of pickled tongue, sweetbread, lamb, veal, bacon, and hard-boiled eggs. A rich gravy is then added (which will solidify upon cooling). Seasonings include cayenne, white pepper, allspice, and salt. Although the pie is topped with a flour-and-water paste (huff paste), it is removed when the pie is cold, and the pie is then turned out upon a dish.

After falling out of fashion again, it was revived in 2006 as part of the Devizes Food and Drink Festival. In 2009, it was claimed to ease the symptoms of irritable bowel syndrome due to the high quantities of nucleotides in the offal.

A recipe published in The Times in 1956 specified the main ingredients as thin slices from a boiled calf's head with the brains and tongue cut into strips, as well as slices of cold cooked bacon and lamb, and rounds of hard-boiled eggs. More recent recipes have limited the offal to tongue, and replaced the other meats and eggs with stewing lamb, lean veal, sliced ham and bacon. The dish was featured by Terry Wogan during his television series The Great British Food Trip in 2015, when he sampled it at the Black Swan in Devizes.

== See also ==
- List of pies, tarts and flans
