= Palmier =

French pastry

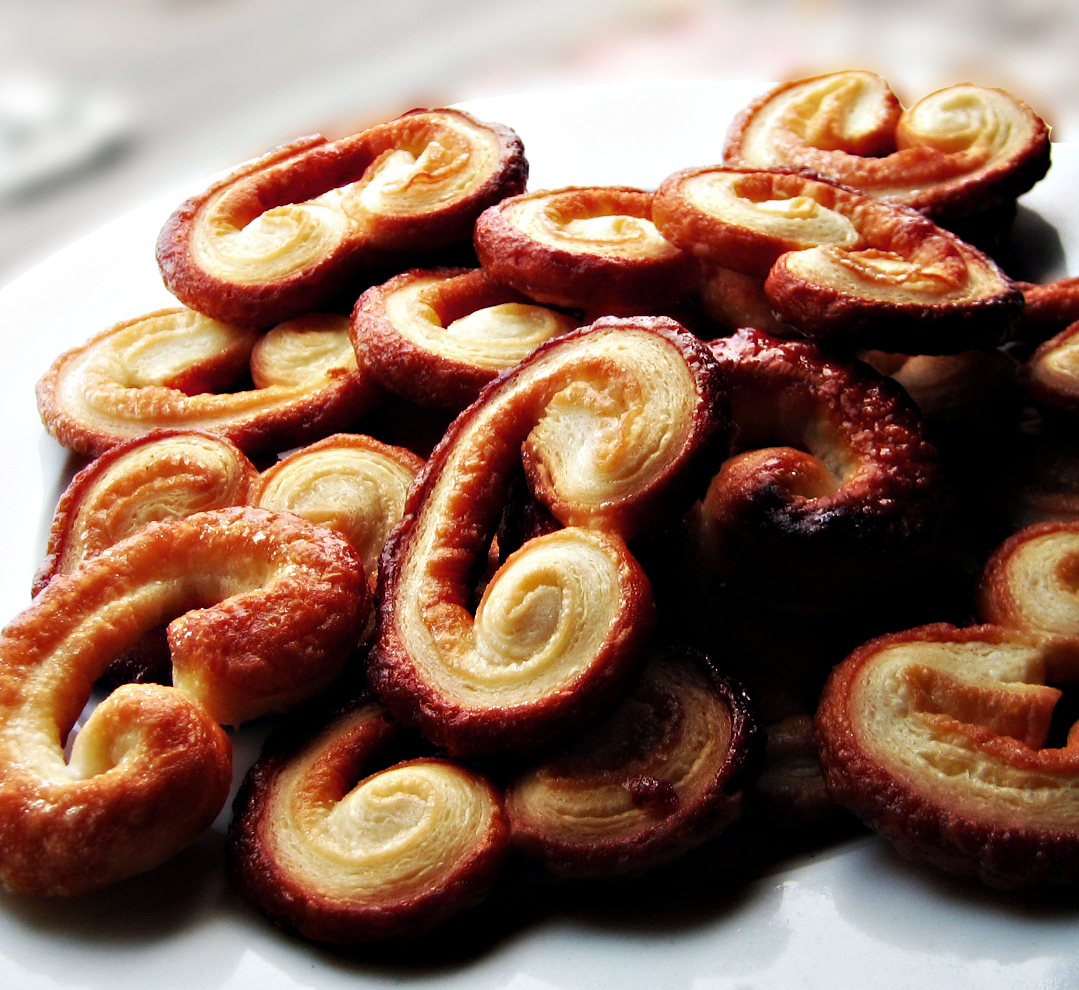
- A plate of palmiers
- Alternative names: Palm tree, elephant ear, pig's ear, prussiens
- Type: Pastry
- Place of origin: France
- Main ingredients: Puff pastry, butter, sugar

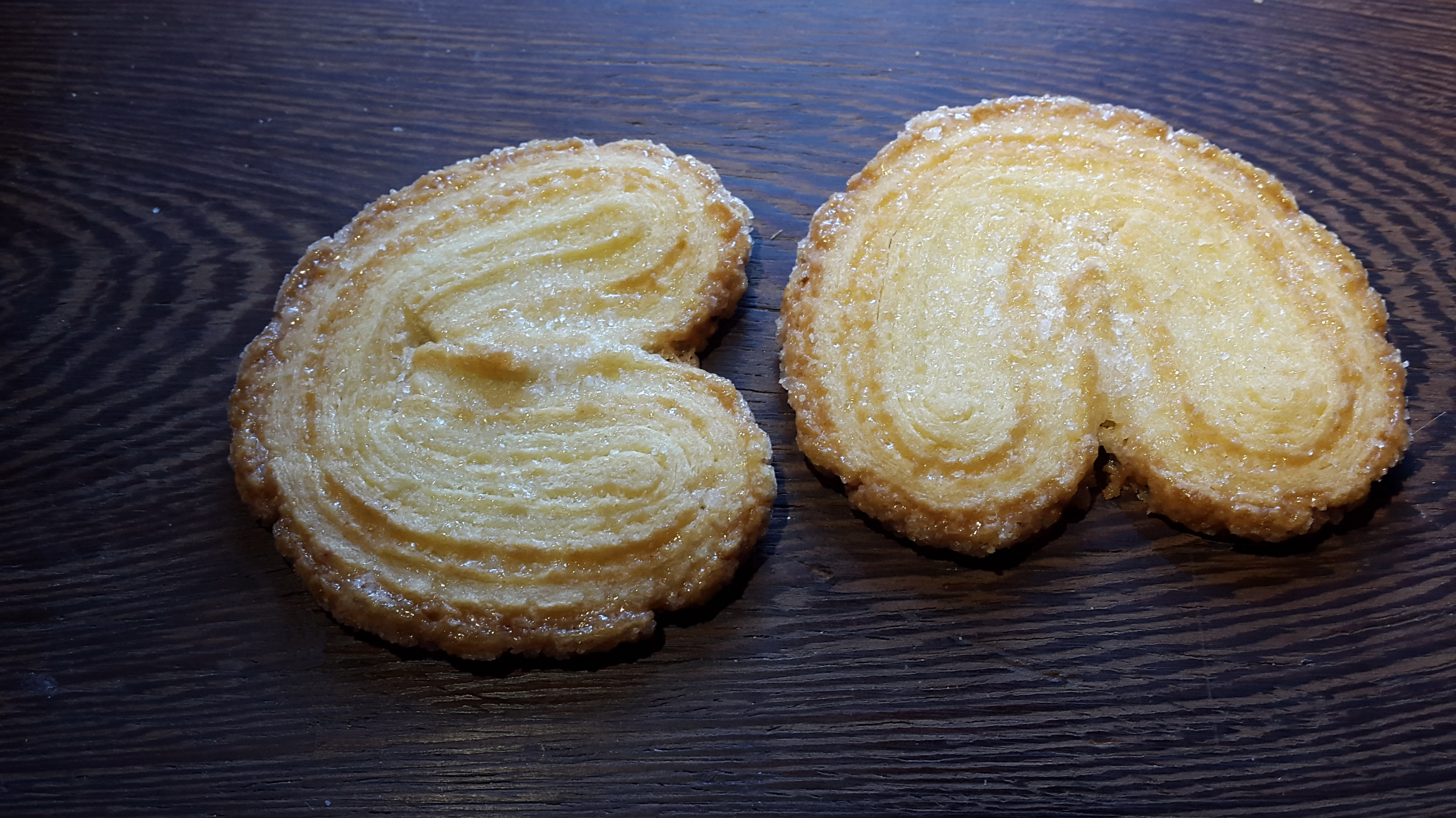
Pig's ears

A palmier (/ˈpælmieɪ/, from French, short for feuille de palmier 'palm tree leaf'), pig's ear, palm heart, or elephant ear is a French pastry in a palm leaf shape or a butterfly shape, sometimes called palm leaves, cœur de France, French hearts, shoe-soles, or glasses, that were invented in the beginning of the 20th century.

== Etymology ==
Palmier is derived from the French word for palm tree. The pastry is shaped like a leaf of such trees.

== Preparation ==
Palmiers are made from puff pastry, a laminated dough similar to the dough used for croissants, but without yeast. The puff pastry is rolled out, coated with sugar, and then the two sides are rolled up together so that they meet in the middle, making a roll that is then cut into about 1/4 in (6 mm) slices and baked. Usually it is rolled in sugar before baking.

== Varieties ==
The pastries are known as palmeras ('palm trees') in Spain, and they can be topped with coconut or chocolate; they are also available for purchase in a larger version. In the Catalonia and Valencia regions they are called ulleres ('eyeglasses') as well.

In the Puerto Rican version, they are topped with honey. In Mexico and other Latin American countries they are known as orejas ('ears') or orejitas ('little ears'). In Colombia they are known as mariposas ('butterflies'). In Argentina and Chile, they are known as palmeritas, derivative from the Spanish denomination.

In the United States, desserts similar to palmiers known as pastry hearts are popular in Buffalo, New York.

In Greece they are usually known as 'little glasses' (γυαλάκια, gyalákia). In Germany they are Schweineohren ('pig's ears'); in Italy Prussiane (derisively after the ostensibly large ears of Prussian invaders) or, more often, ventagli / ventagliette 'fan' / 'little fans'; in French-speaking Switzerland Prussiens or cœur de France. In England, they are called little hearts or sweet hearts, and in Scotland pig's ears or pig's lugs.

In Japan, they are called Genji Pie. In India they are known as elephant ears, French hearts, or projapoti (প্রজাপতি, Bangla for 'butterfly') biscuits. In China, they are known as butterfly pastries. In Pakistan they are called French hearts. In Ukraine they are known as вушка (vushka, 'little ears') and in Russia ушки (ushki, also meaning 'little ears').

An arlette is a cinnamon-flavoured palmier biscuit.

== See also ==
- List of pastries
- Otap, a similar oval-shaped pastry from the Philippines
