= The Great British Bake Off series 9 =

Ninth series of The Great British Bake Off

The Great British Bake Off
- Series 9
- Presented by: Noel Fielding; Sandi Toksvig
- Judges: Paul Hollywood; Prue Leith
- No. of contestants: 12
- Winner: Rahul Mandal
- Runners-up: Kim-Joy; Ruby Bhogal
- Location: Welford Park, Berkshire
- No. of max. bakes: 30
- No. of episodes: 10

Release
- Original network: Channel 4
- Original release: 28 August – 30 October 2018

Series chronology
- ← Previous; Series 8 Next → Series 10

The ninth series of The Great British Bake Off began on 28 August 2018, with this being the second series to be broadcast on Channel 4. The series is presented by Noel Fielding and Sandi Toksvig, with judges Paul Hollywood and Prue Leith. This series saw a few changes to the usual format: the first episode being Biscuit Week (the previous 8 series began with a Cake Week), the documentary inserts were dropped, and the finale included the competitors doing a technical challenge outside the tent for the first time.

The series was won by Rahul Mandal, with Kim-Joy and Ruby Bhogal as the runners-up.

== Bakers ==
Contestant	Age	Hometown	Occupation	Finish	Place
Imelda McCarron	33	County Tyrone, Northern Ireland	Countryside recreation officer	Episode 1	12th
Luke Thompson	30	Sheffield, England	Civil servant/house and techno DJ	Episode 2	11th
Antony Amourdoux	30	London, England	Banker	Episode 3	10th
Karen Wright	60	Wakefield, England	In-store sampling assistant	Episode 5	8th (tie)
Terry Hartill	56	West Midlands, England	Retired air steward	Episode 5	8th (tie)
Dan Beasley-Harling	36	London, England	Stay at home parent	Episode 6	7th
Jon Jenkins	47	Newport, Wales	Blood courier	Episode 7	6th
Manon Lagrève	26	London, England	Software project manager	Episode 8	5th
Briony Williams	33	Bristol, England	Stay at home parent	Episode 9	4th
Kim-Joy Hewlett	27	Leeds, England	Mental health specialist	Episode 10	Runner-up
Ruby Bhogal	29	London, England	Project manager	Episode 10	Runner-up
Rahul Mandal	30	Rotherham, England	Research scientist	Episode 10	1st

== Results summary ==
Elimination chart
Baker	1	2	3	4	5	6	7	8	9	10
Rahul	SAFE	SB	SB	HIGH	HIGH	HIGH	HIGH	LOW	LOW	WINNER
Kim-Joy	SAFE	SAFE	SAFE	SAFE	SB	SAFE	SB	LOW	HIGH	Runner-up
Ruby	LOW	SAFE	SAFE	SAFE	SAFE	HIGH	LOW	SB	SB	Runner-up
Briony	HIGH	LOW	LOW	LOW	LOW	SB	SAFE	HIGH	OUT	
Manon	SB	SAFE	SAFE	SAFE	HIGH	LOW	SAFE	OUT		
Jon	SAFE	HIGH	SAFE	HIGH	LOW	SAFE	OUT			
Dan	SAFE	HIGH	HIGH	SB	SAFE	OUT				
Karen	SAFE	SAFE	SAFE	LOW	OUT					
Terry	LOW	LOW	SAFE	N/A^{[a]}	OUT					
Antony	SAFE	SAFE	OUT							
Luke	SAFE	OUT								
Imelda	OUT									

^{[a]} Terry was ill and unable to compete in episode 4, but the bakers agreed he should return to the competition the following week. At the end of episode 4, the judges decided it was unfair to eliminate anyone in Terry's absence. Consequently, two bakers were eliminated the following week.

Colour key:

Baker was one of the judges' least favourite bakers that week, but was not eliminated.
Baker was one of the judges' favourite bakers that week, but was not the Star Baker.
Baker got through to the next round.
Baker did not compete that week.
Baker was eliminated.
Baker was the Star Baker.
Baker was a series runner-up.
Baker was the series winner.

== Episodes ==
Colour key:

Baker was eliminated at conclusion of episode
Baker received a "Hollywood handshake" for respective bake
Baker was named "Star Baker" at conclusion of episode
Baker was named runner-up for the series
Baker won series

=== Episode 1: Biscuits ===
Breaking with tradition, this year the series kicked off with biscuit week. For the first challenge of the series, the bakers were tasked to bake 24 regional biscuits that needed to be all identical, and said something about them and a place in the British Isles, in 2 hours. For the first technical challenge of this series, they are tasked to make one of Paul Hollywood's childhood favourites - Wagon Wheels, in 2 1/4 hours. Finally, for the showstopper, the bakers had to create a spectacular 3D biscuit self-portrait that needed to be constructed with layers of biscuits and judged while placed upright on an easel stand, all in 4 hours.

Baker	Signature (24 Regional Biscuits)	Technical (8 Wagon Wheels)	Showstopper (3D Biscuit Self-Portrait)	Result
Antony	Turmeric and Caraway Goosnargh Cakes	12th	"Kilimanjaro Selfie"	Safe
Briony	Apple Cider Empire Biscuits	2nd	"Bristol Biscuit Selfie"	Safe
Dan	Lemon and Strawberry Shrewsburys	4th	"New Dad in Palm Springs"	Safe
Imelda	Cherry and White Chocolate Oatmeal Biscuits	11th	"Seaside Selfie"	Eliminated
Jon	Aberffraw 'Creams'	5th	"A Sailing Selfie by the Sea"	Safe
Karen	Yorkshire Perkins	6th	Rosewater and Cardamom "Holiday Selfie"	Safe
Kim-Joy	Orange Blossom York Biscuits	10th	"Me at Miyajima Shrine"	Safe
Luke	Yorkshire Gingernuts	8th	"What Happens In Vegas...!"	Safe
Manon	Hazelnut Cornish Shortbread	3rd	Matcha and White Chocolate Ganache Japanese Selfie	Star Baker
Rahul	Fennel and Coconut Pitcaithly Bannock	7th	"First Spring in the UK"	Safe
Ruby	Masala Chai Devon Flats	1st	"Gingerbread Marathon Selfie"	Safe
Terry	Lake District Ginger Shortbread	9th	"Brandy Snap Selfie"	Safe

=== Episode 2: Cakes ===
For their signature bakes, the bakers were required to create a traybake sliced into 16 identical pieces in 2 hours. The technical challenge was set by Prue, which featured a cake with an unusual ingredient: Le Gâteau Vert, one of French painter Claude Monet's favourite birthday treats, in 2 1/4 hours. The cake featured a pistachio genoise sponge sandwiched by a pistachio crème au beurre and covered by a green fondant coloured by spinach. For the showstopper, the bakers were required to create a technically demanding chocolate collar cake, featuring at least two tiers, in 4 hours.

Baker	Signature (16 Traybakes)	Technical (Le Gâteau Vert)	Showstopper (Chocolate Collar Cake)	Result
Antony	Cardamom and Coconut Burfi Traybake	9th	Pistachio, Saffron and Rose Cake	Safe
Briony	Turron and Orange Traybake	5th	Chocolate Fudge and Salted Caramel Creation	Safe
Dan	Black Forest Slice	3rd	Dark Chocolate and Raspberry Birthday Cake	Safe
Jon	Lemon Meringue Traybake	1st	Hawaiian Shirt Pina Colada Cake	Safe
Karen	Almond and Marzipan Traybake with Rhubarb Jam	11th	Strawberry Fayre Chocolate Cake	Safe
Kim-Joy	Pandan Chiffon Cake with Palm Sugar Cream	4th	Yuzu and Raspberry Genoise Cat Cake	Safe
Luke	Lemon and Poppy Seed Traybake	7th	Raspberry and White Chocolate Collar Cake	Eliminated
Manon	Rosemary and Honey Traybake	6th	Almond Princess Cake	Safe
Rahul	Lemon and Cardamom Traybake	2nd	Chocolate Orange Layer Cake (Note: First handshake given for a Showstopper challenge)	Star Baker
Ruby	Boozy Black Forest Traybake	10th	Chocolate Orange "Jackson Pollock" Collar Cake	Safe
Terry	Rum and Raisin Traybake	8th	Champagne and Strawberries Eiffel Tower Collar Cake	Safe

=== Episode 3: Bread ===
For their signature bakes, the bakers had 3 hours to create a British classic, 12 chelsea buns. In the technical challenge, the bakers, using Paul Hollywood's recipe, were tasked to make a batch of 8 grilled non-yeasted garlic naans, brushed with garlic ghee and topped with coriander, in 1 hour. For their showstopper, the bakers were asked to create a three-tiered Korovai to be elaborately decorated for a celebratory occasion, in 5 hours. Most of the bakers chose the traditional wedding theme.

Baker	Signature (12 Chelsea Buns)	Technical (8 Non-Yeasted Garlic Naan)	Showstopper (Korovai)	Result
Antony	Decadent Breakfast Chelsea Buns	8th	Chocolate and Orange Adventure Korovai	Eliminated
Briony	Balsamic Strawberry Chelsea Buns	9th	Happily Ever After Korovai	Safe
Dan	Sticky Spiced Orange Chelsea Buns	6th	Wedding Korovai	Safe
Jon	Cardiff City vs Chelsea Buns	2nd	Korovai Dydd Dewi Sant	Safe
Karen	Peak District Christmas Chelsea Buns	5th	French Breakfast Wedding Korovai	Safe
Kim-Joy	Pistachio and Cardamom Tangzhong Chelsea Buns	10th	Orange, Cinnamon and Cranberry 'Kit-ovai'	Safe
Manon	Apricot, Cranberry and Marzipan Chai Chelsea Buns	3rd	Fabergé Inspired Traditional Korovai	Safe
Rahul	Mango and Cranberry Chelsea Buns	4th	Garden Wedding Korovai	Star Baker
Ruby	Gujarela Chelsea Buns with Dates, Almonds and Raisins	7th	Mama and Papa's Belated Wedding Korovai	Safe
Terry	Tangy Citrus Sticky Chelsea Buns	1st	Garden Korovai	Safe

=== Episode 4: Desserts ===
At the start of this episode, it was announced that Terry was not able to compete this week due to illness. But, with the agreement of all, he would be allowed to come back to the competition the following week. For their signature bakes, the bakers were required to create a meringue roulade in 1 hour and 45 minutes. For their technical challenge, using Prue's recipe, the bakers were tasked to produce a raspberry blancmange served with 12 langues de chat biscuits in 2 1/2 hours. For their showstoppers, the bakers were tasked to create a spectacular melting chocolate ball dessert, which is a chocolate sphere that would be melted away with a hot sauce, revealing the dessert hidden inside, in 3 hours. After the three challenges, Briony and Karen were left as the bottom two. However, nobody was eliminated this week, as the judges deemed it would be unfair to send anyone home with Terry's absence. However, this meant two bakers would be eliminated the following week.

Baker	Signature (Meringue Roulade)	Technical (Raspberry Blancmange with 12 Langues du Chat)	Showstopper (Melting Chocolate Ball Dessert)	Result
Briony	Treacle Tart Roulade	5th	Blood Orange & Amaretto Sticky Toffee Sphere	Safe
Dan	Florida Roulade	1st	Dan and the Giant Peach	Star Baker
Jon	Mango and Passion Fruit Roulade	3rd	Lucy and Hannah's Ballet Cake	Safe
Karen	Coffee Cream and Praline Roulade	7th	Chateau Du Chambord Framboise	Safe
Kim-Joy	'Sweet Dreams' Roulade	6th	Melting Chocolate Galaxy	Safe
Manon	Amarene and Kirsch Cherry Roulade	8th	White Chocolate Renaissance Surprise	Safe
Rahul	Rhubarb and Custard Roulade	4th	Opera Cake with Kalash Inspired Dome	Safe
Ruby	Pina Colada Roulade	2nd	Chocolate Egg	Safe
Terry	Did not compete			Safe

=== Episode 5: Spice ===
For the signature challenge, the bakers were tasked to bake a ginger cake in 2 hours. For the technical challenge, using Paul Hollywood's recipe, the bakers must create a batch of 12 ma'amoul, an ancient pastry from the Middle East that none of the bakers had heard of, in 1 1/2 hours. In the batch, 6 of the ma'amoul must be filled with walnuts and shaped with a mould, and the other 6 must be filled with a date paste and decorated by pinching the dough with ma'amoul tongs. For their showstoppers, the bakers were tasked to create a beautiful, gravity-defying spiced biscuit chandelier to be done in 4 hours. Prue was unwell during the showstoppers round, and as a result, Paul was left as the solo judge.

Baker	Signature (Ginger Cake)	Technical (12 Ma'amoul)	Showstopper (Spiced Biscuit Chandelier)	Result
Briony	Honey and Apricot Ginger Cake	6th	Turmeric Latte Chandelier	Safe
Dan	Ginger and Lemon Drip Cake	2nd	Birthday Kaleidoscope for Constance	Safe
Jon	Family Christmas Ginger Cake	7th	Birthday Chandelier for Emily's 21st	Safe
Karen	Bonfire Night Ginger Cake	9th	Pontefract Girls' School Reunion	Eliminated
Kim-Joy	Stem Ginger Cake with Poached Pears	4th	Christmas Spiced Ice Chandelier	Star Baker
Manon	Italian Meringue Ginger Cake	5th	Art Deco Spiced Biscuit Chandelier	Safe
Rahul	Bonfire Night Caramel Ginger Cake	3rd	Durga Puja Cardamom Chandelier	Safe
Ruby	Jamaican Me Crazy Ginger Cake	1st	Peacock Chandelier	Safe
Terry	Caramelised Pear and Stem Ginger Cake	8th	12 Days of Christmas Chandelier	Eliminated

=== Episode 6: Pastry ===
For the signature challenge, the bakers were tasked to make 12 samosas—6 savoury, 6 sweet—in 2 hours. The samosas must also be served with a dip to complement them. The technical challenge was set by Prue Leith, and the bakers were required to make 6 puits d'amour, meaning "well of love", in 2 hours. For the showstopper challenge, the bakers were tasked to create a shaped banquet pie that would be beautifully decorated enough to act as a centrepiece at a Tudor banquet in 3 1/2 hours.

Baker	Signature (12 Samosas)	Technical (6 Puits D'amour)	Showstopper (Shaped Banquet Pie)	Result
Briony	Home Comforts	1st	"Down the Rabbit Hole" Banquet Pie	Star Baker
Dan	Festive Samosas	6th	Salmon Coulibiac	Eliminated
Jon	A Romantic Dinner For Two, Samosa Style	2nd	Welsh Dragon Pie	Safe
Kim-Joy	Flavours of India	5th	Silke the Vegetarian Mermaid	Safe
Manon	Samosas for Mum	4th	"What Has Poppy Eaten?"	Safe
Rahul	Paneer Singara and Misti Singara	3rd	Butterfly Pie	Safe
Ruby	Traditional Samosas	7th	Kohinoor Crown	Safe

=== Episode 7: Vegan ===
The remaining 6 bakers were required, in the signature challenge, to make 8 savoury vegan tartlets of 2 different fillings using shortcrust pastry that contained no butter or eggs in 2 hours. For the technical challenge, using Prue Leith's recipe, the bakers were tasked to make a vegan tropical fruit pavlova using aquafaba in place of egg whites to create the meringue in 2 1/2 hours. For the showstopper, the bakers were tasked to create a beautiful vegan celebratory cake in 4 hours.

Baker	Signature (8 Savoury Vegan Tartlets)	Technical (Vegan Tropical Fruit Pavlova)	Showstopper (Vegan Celebratory Cake)	Result
Briony	French Onion Tartlets; Celeriac & Apple Tartlets	5th	Hazelnut Mocha Cake	Safe
Jon	Garlic Mushroom Tartlets; Falafel & Hummus Tartlets	4th	Only Fools Eat Horses Cake	Eliminated
Kim-Joy	Broccoli & Tomato Quiches; Mascarpone Squirrel Tartlets	6th	Lavender & Lemon Fox Cake	Star Baker
Manon	Summer & Winter Tartlets	2nd	Spiced Apple Cake	Safe
Rahul	Coriander Posto & Veg Tartlets; Ghugni Chaat Tartlets	1st	Chocolate & Coconut Layer Cake with Raspberry Jam	Safe
Ruby	Sage & Butternut Tartlets 'Cheesy Greens' Tartlets	3rd	Chocolate, Lemon & Coconut Cake	Safe

=== Episode 8: Danish (Quarterfinals) ===
In the quarterfinal signature challenge, the final 5 bakers were tasked to make a rye bread and from it to make 2 types of Smørrebrød in 3 1/2 hours. For the technical challenge, the bakers were instructed to make 14 Æbleskiver containing a cinnamon and apple filling, and served with a strawberry jam dipping sauce in 1 hour. For the showstopper challenge, the bakers were required to make a kagemand or a kagekone, a traditional Danish birthday cake made from Danish pastry that resembles a boy or a girl, in 4 1/2 hours. The bakers' kagemand/kagekone must be based on someone the bakers recognised and they must use at least three different confectionery making skills within it.

Baker	Signature (2 Smørrebrød)	Technical (14 Æbleskiver)	Showstopper (Kagemand/Kagekone)	Result
Briony	Spanish & West Country Smørrebrød	1st	Nana Pat Kagekone	Safe
Kim-Joy	Bumblebee Eggs & Fish Smørrebrød	2nd	Off to the Opera Kagekone	Safe
Manon	Cheese and Fruit Smørrebrød	4th	Birthday Girl Kagekone	Eliminated
Rahul	Smoked Salmon & Roasted Vegetable Smørrebrød	5th	Indian King Kagemand	Safe
Ruby	Post-Gym Smørrebrød	3rd	Sister Kagekone	Star Baker

=== Episode 9: Pâtisserie (Semi-final) ===
In the pâtisserie semifinal signature challenge, the bakers were tasked to make 24 dipped Madeleines, in 2 designs and flavours, in 1 1/2 hours. For the technical challenge, the bakers tackled Prue Leith's complex recipe for Torta Setteveli, a 7-layered cake containing 2 light chocolate genoise sponges, hazelnut bavarois, crunchy praline base and a chocolate mousse, topped with a chocolate mirror glaze, to be completed in 3 1/2 hours. For the penultimate showstopper challenge, the bakers were tasked to create a Parisian pâtisserie window containing 36 pâtisserie in 3 types: choux pastry, pate sucree and puff pastry mille-feuille, in 5 hours.

Baker	Signature (24 Dipped Madeleines)	Technical (Torta Setteveli)	Showstopper (Parisian Pâtisserie Window)	Result
Briony	Mojito Madeleines; Espresso Martini Madeleines	3rd	British Tea to French Pâtisserie Window	Eliminated
Kim-Joy	Ginger and Lemon Madeleines; Orange Bunny Madeleines	2nd	Flavourite Flavours Window Display	Safe
Rahul	Lemon and Raspberry Madeleines; Orange Curd Madeleines	4th	Classic Tribute to Pâtisserie Window	Safe
Ruby	Pick Your Own Madeleines	1st	Parisian Un Bouquet de Fleurs Window Display	Star Baker

=== Episode 10: Final ===
For the final signature challenge, the last 3 bakers were required to make 12 iced doughnuts of 2 types, filled and ring, in 3 hours. The technical challenge was another Bake Off first, where the bakers were asked to carry out the challenge outside the tent. Using Paul Hollywood's recipe, the bakers needed to produce 6 pita breads in 90 minutes, to be served with 3 different dips: baba ghanoush, smoked garlic salsa verde and burnt pepper salsa, using the open campfire set up outside. For the final showstopper, the bakers were asked to create an incredible landscape dessert with at least 3 different elements within it, in 4 1/2 hours. During the showstopper, one of Rahul's storage glass jars exploded under the intense heat, which resulted in shards of broken glass shattered all over his bench and potentially contaminated his bakes, requiring clean up from the production team. As a result, he was given an extra 15 minutes for the challenge.

Baker	Signature (12 Iced Doughnuts)	Technical (6 Campfire Pita Breads)	Showstopper (Landscape Dessert)	Result
Kim-Joy	Amaretto Diplomat Filled Doughnuts; Lemon Ring Doughnuts	1st	Lost City of Atlantis Dessert Landscape	Runner-up
Rahul	Mango Créme Pâtissière Filled Doughnuts; Spiced Orange Ring Doughnuts	2nd	Edible Rock Garden	Winner
Ruby	Dulce De Leche Filled Doughnuts; Raspberry and Cardamom Ring Doughnuts	3rd	Magical Edible Landscape	Runner-up

== Specials ==
The two holiday specials each feature four returning contestants from the series 5–8.

The Great Christmas Bake Off featured Liam Charles (Series 8), Flo Atkins (Series 8), Andrew Smyth (Series 7) and Jane Beedle (Series 7). The special was won by Jane Beedle.

The Great Festive Bake Off featured the return of winner Candice Brown (Series 7), Steven Carter-Bailey (Series 8), Tamal Ray (Series 6) and Kate Henry (Series 5). The special was won by Steven Carter-Bailey.

=== The Great Christmas Bake Off ===
For the signature challenge, the bakers were asked to create 12 iced biscuits based on the theme of The Twelve Days of Christmas, which can be the bakers' own personal interpretation, in 2 1/2 hours. The technical challenge was set by Paul, where the bakers were tasked to produce 6 Icelandic Laufabrauð in 1 1/4 hours. The final showstopper challenge gave the bakers 4 hours to make a cake in the shape of a Christmas present that reveals a spectacular hidden design when cut open.

Baker	Signature (12 Iced Biscuits)	Technical (6 Laufabrauð)	Showstopper (Hidden Design Christmas Present Cake)	Result
Andrew	'12 Days Home For Christmas' Biscuits	2nd	'Boozy Bauble' Cake	Runner-up
Flo	Spiced Treacle & Ginger Biscuits	4th	'Very Merry Prezzie!'	Runner-up
Jane	'12 Days of Decorating' Biscuits	1st	'Practically Perfect Penguin Present' Cake	Winner
Liam	'12 Essentials of Liam' Vanilla Mince Pie Shortbread	3rd	'3-In-1 It's Gotta Be Fun' Cake	Runner-up

=== The Great Festive Bake Off ===
The returning bakers were tasked to bake an iced stollen wreath for their signature challenge in only 3 hours. The technical challenge was set by Prue, who asked the bakers to make 4 snow eggs crowned with delicate spun sugar cages in 1 1/2 hours. For the final showstopper challenge, the bakers were tasked to make a 3D New Year's Resolution Cake, where all decorations must be edible, in 4 1/2 hours.

Baker	Signature (Iced Stollen Wreath)	Technical (4 Snow Eggs)	Showstopper (3D New Year's Resolution Cake)	Result
Candice	'Festive' Apple Stollen	2nd	'Wear More Lipstick' Cake	Runner-up
Kate	Ginger & Almond Stollen	4th	'Dream Restaurant' Cake	Runner-up
Steven	'Stag Night' Stollen	1st	'Communication' Cake (Note: Received a "Hollywood hug")	Winner
Tamal	Orange & Rum Stollen	3rd	'Tailor's Dummy' Cake	Runner-up

== Ratings ==
The final was watched by an overnight viewing audience figure of 7.5 million, down from the previous final of 7.7 million and the lowest since 2012. The ratings below are cumulative figures over longer periods, and they include multiple-screen viewing figures (on TV, computer, tablet and smartphone), the first year this system was implemented, and the figures are therefore slightly higher than it would have been without the multiple-screen viewing figures.

Episode no.	Airdate	7 day viewers (millions)	28 day viewers (millions)	Channel 4 weekly ranking	Weekly ranking all channels
1	28 August 2018	9.55	9.92	1	3
2	4 September 2018	9.31	9.76	1	3
3	11 September 2018	8.91	9.35	1	2
4	18 September 2018	8.88	9.41	1	3
5	25 September 2018	8.67	9.15	1	3
6	2 October 2018	8.91	9.30	1	4
7	9 October 2018	9.22	9.54	1	3
8	16 October 2018	9.69	9.93	1	2
9	23 October 2018	9.50	9.70	1	3
10	30 October 2018	10.34	10.54	1	2
