= Honjok =

South Korean term for people who do things alone

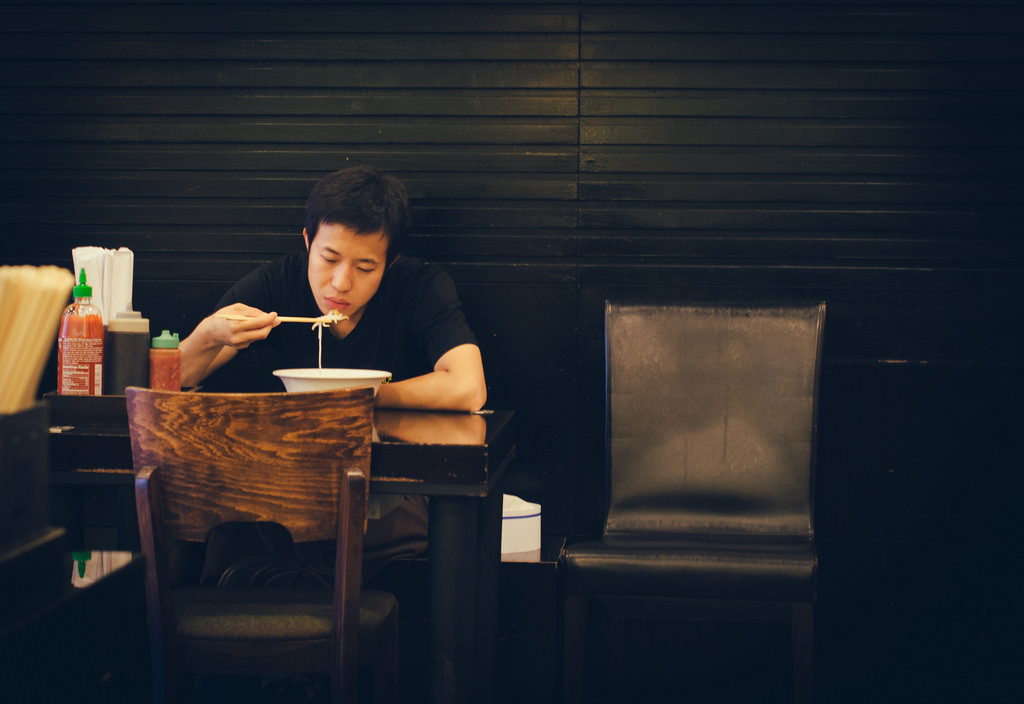
Honbap which is part of Honjok

Honjok (Korean: 혼족) is a South Korean term for people who willingly undertake activities alone. The term was popularized in 2017 when South Korea saw an increase in the number of people eating, drinking, traveling, and doing other activities alone. The honjok lifestyle is considered a "significant shift" away from South Korea's traditionally group-oriented society.

== Definition ==
Honjok is a new term that has gradually increased in usage since 2010 when the number of one-person households began to grow. It refers to a person who engages in solo activity such as eating, enjoying leisure activities, shopping, or taking trips alone, etc. It is a different concept from the 'cocoon group' of living alone.

It is a combination of the Korean words 혼자 (honja) 'alone' and the suffix -족 (-jok) 'tribe'.

Honjok can be divided into honbap, honsul and honnol.

- Honbap (혼밥) is the act of eating alone. For example, if one enjoys eating rice alone without being conscious of the gaze of others, and feels satisfaction from seeking out and dining alone in a restaurant, it is called honbap (혼자 (honja) 'alone' and 밥 (bap) 'rice/food').
- Honnol (혼놀) refers to people who do not feel alone in the traditional sense of being lonely, and enjoy their own time and space for play and leisure activities (혼자 (honja) 'alone' and 놀다 (nolda) 'to play').
- Honsul (혼술) means the act of drinking alone in a bar without being conscious of the gaze of others (혼자 (honja) 'alone' and 술 (sul) 'alcohol').

== Popularity ==
=== Honbap ===
Growing interest in honbap culture is causing an increase in the number of restaurants targeted at people enjoying it. As it became popular, the level of honbap was divided into six levels:

Level 1: Convenience store; Level 2: student restaurant or cafeteria; Level 3: fast food restaurant; Level 4: normal restaurant; Level 5: family restaurant; and Level 6: bar or BBQ restaurant.

According to statistical data researched by Embrain, the reasons that people enjoy honbap include: scheduled in another area with nobody available (36.8%), having no time to eat with other people (35.6%); feeling comfortable eating alone (23.8%).

=== Honnol ===
There are many different types of honnol. There is a coin karaoke room designed for one person to sing or watch movies alone. The coin karaoke room is a place where people can freely sing songs without paying attention to other people. As the number of single-person households grows, the proportion of coin karaoke rooms established in 2016 has grown by 70%. Another type of honnol is watching movies alone. People can choose a good spot by themselves and eat snacks according to their own tastes. According to statistics, the reason people watch movies alone is because watching with others is a cumbersome and complicated process (48.2%), watching immersive movies (49%), and willingness to watch movies alone (38.8%).

=== Honsul ===
Statistics researched by Korea Food and Drug Administration show the following places are preferred when engaging in honsul: at home (85.2%), in a pub (7.2%), and in a restaurant (5.2%). Other reasons individuals enjoy honsul are: drinking comfortably (62.6%), and to relieve stress (17.6%). Other reasons were temporal reasons or trends. The frequency of people's willingness to experience honsul once or twice per month was 47.8%. This was followed by one or twice a week at 30.4%, and three to four times a month at 10.1%. 8.4% enjoyed honsul between three and four times a week. Those who drank daily were 3.2%.

== Causes ==
=== Social causes ===
==== Ennui in human relations ====
The number of young people who give up their relationships due to increasing competition, difficulty in finding jobs, and living difficulties is increasing. These young people are reluctant to try to maintain unnecessary human relationships and do not feel the need for new ones. They try to avoid meetings which involve many people. They also do not think they need to maintain human relationships because of stress.

According to a survey which researched the perceptions and realities of human relationships of students in their 20s, 50.1% of the students answered: "I have avoided meeting intentionally with people I did not know or did not like at first", while 41.7% answered: "I feel anxiety when the conversation is interrupted." They say that it is better to be alone than to maintain relationships with people. In 2010, the word honsul was said only 14 times, but in 2016, it soared to 27,778 occasions. The word honbap was also said to be a mere six times in 2010, but it was mentioned more than 6,000 times in 2016. As can be seen with these data, honsul, honbap, and honnol usage increased dramatically.

==== Increase of one-person households ====
A one-person household means that they solve every issue in their own lives on their own. This is because the traditional family relationship is rapidly breaking apart as the ageing population grows and the birth rate shrinks. The proportion of one-person households is increasing as the population ages. In 2015, the proportion of one-person households whose head of the family was younger than 39 years old was the highest at 36.9%; the second highest was from 40 to 59 years old with 33.2%; and last was those who were over 60 years old, which was more than 30%. However, for 2045, one-person households of those above 60 years of age are expected to increase by 54%. Six out of ten college students showed no reluctance to live alone in their daily lives. There were also many people who preferred a one-person household.

=== Cultural causes ===
==== A change of perception ====
According to Korean social trends in 2015 released by the Korea National Statistical Office (NSO), about 56.8% of Koreans over 15 years of age prefer to enjoy their leisure time alone. Only 8.3% of respondents said they spent their leisure time with friends. Usually, there is a prejudice with honnol that there is "no friend to play with", but arguably these statistics show that people who have a lot of friends also enjoy honnol. It is better for them to do what they like rather than endure stressful situations when coordinating plans with their friends. People's perception is also a cause for this trend. Over time, people may not think that honnol is poor social behavior. When people in their 20s were asked if they experienced discomfort with respect to working alone, 74.7% said "no". Thus almost three-quarters of people in their 20s do not mind doing activities alone.

==== Media ====
As the number of people participating in honjok increases, broadcasters have responded by featuring it in various entertainment and drama productions. Examples include '나혼자산다'/ I Live Alone, '미운우리새끼'/ My Little Old Boy and '혼술남녀'/ Men and Women Drinking Alone. While drawing upon the daily lives of entertainers, they also like depicting the lives of ordinary people, creating a popular consensus among ordinary people. In the case of 'I Live Alone' and 'My Little Old Boy', the actors appear to be discouraged and feel depressively unimportant; it is all about showing off the lives of celebrities who live alone. In the case of the drama 'Men and Women Drinking Alone', the actors show mixed emotions when they try to solve their troubles. In the drama, the main characters grew in popularity with viewers, enjoying the beer they bought at a convenience store or dining at a mix of luxury restaurants.

Whether it is voluntary or involuntary, they have been surrounded by loneliness and compassion in the drama. However, the past negative perception of living alone like bullying and outsiders has gradually transformed into free and rational. Therefore, programmes targeting "one-person households" and honjok are expected to increase further.

== Effects ==
=== Solo economy ===
One of the most significant changes in households is consumer culture and the emergence of a solo economy. The biggest characteristic of a solo economy is the hefty purchasing power. According to the Korean Chamber of Commerce and Industry (KCCI) survey of 500 households nationwide, households with one to one and three-quarter members accounted for a total of 32.9%, which is twice as high as 17.2% of households with three to four members.

The amount of disposable household income per household is 805,000 won (₩) per solo household, compared to ₩ 735,000 won for households with three to four members. Disposable income means income that can be freely used for consumption and saving of income. Accordingly, experts predict that the income of one-person households will grow close to around ₩200 trillion by 2030.

The Korea Institute for Industrial Economics and Trade estimates that the size of household spending will increase from ₩60 trillion in 2010 to ₩120 trillion in 2020. According to the Korea Chamber of Commerce and Industry, the keyword for one-person households can be referred to as 'S-O-L-O'. An item to increase expenditure on one or higher is as follows.

1. Self-oriented consumption for self. Families spend less time alone and spend less money on hobbies and personal grooming.

2. Online consumption. Since the one-person household consumers usually have a propensity to purchase heavy, bulky, high-frequency goods online, shopping malls offer regular delivery of goods. This includes regular deliveries of items such as bottled water using a regular delivery supplying it to one person in 24 hours.

3. Low-priced consumption. This is a characteristic of one-person households that prefer an inexpensive price range while purchasing in a discount period.

4. Convenience-oriented consumption. Based on the propensity to use less furniture, convenience stores continue to grow in popularity and the food industry is producing more home snacks aimed at one-person households.

HMR markets are also fierce. The abbreviation of HMR stands for Home Meal Replacement. Specifically, it is a cooked food sold outside of the home that can be substituted for a home meal. There are four types of HMR: RTP (Ready To Prepare) Food ingredients can be cooked conveniently; RTC (Ready To Cook) Simple food that can be eaten quickly after cooking; RTH (Ready to Heat) Food that can be cooked directly by means of a microwave or similar small appliance; and RTE (Ready to Eat) Food that can be eaten immediately after the packaging is removed.

The National Statistical Office estimates 65.6 million household units in 2025, and 762 million units in 2035, and will continue to grow. The proportion of female economic activities and the proportion of working households will also increase, thus increasing the proportion of HMR. In the past, there were many images of instant food and spicy foods, including Hyega lunchboxes, Baekjongwon lunches, etc. Due to convenient packaging and short cooking times, one-person households and consumer trends, the outlook for HMR markets is considered bright.

=== Companies' customized strategies ===
The one-person households have shifted from high-capacity to small-powered and small-power centers to major commercial products and sales strategies. The Big Mart re-configures the criteria for "1 serving" by collecting recommendations from the Ministry of Health and Welfare, the Ministry of Food, Agriculture, Forestry and Fisheries, and cooking expert opinions. In other words, as the number of single-person households grows, honbap and honsul are established as universal cultures, and in the food and beverage industry, there is a tendency to reduce the size of products and sell them in small packages. It aims to reduce the size and capacity of larger family sizes and family sizes to accommodate smaller family sizes.

The market for marketing and commodity development aimed at one-person households is also the food and restaurant market, which accounts for most of the consumer spending. Products that are suitable for eating alone are being released, and products with moderate amounts of food are available for as many as two to three servings. Furthermore, the latest products are being released in terms of the quality and quantity of the products.

For example, Orion Confectionery is focusing on the resizing strategy of the food and beverage industry, which is adjusting the individual shape of existing hit products to "bite size" or introducing a new quantity of food that an individual can eat. After 35 years, Orion Confectionery has released the "Doctor Yuda Zemini", a smaller version of Dada. Orion Confectionery's popular pie products, 'Choco Pie Chung', 'Choco Pie Deli Banana', and 'Fresh Berry' convenience packages have also gained in popularity. Convenience store exclusive package products consist of good quantities to eat at once and can be enjoyed on the commute as a morning breakfast or in the afternoon as a snack. Binggrae introduced "Together signature", a premium small-sized cup product, 42 years after Together launched the product last year, and recently released 'Together signature cream cheese' with a premium cream cheese brand 'kiri' in France.

In addition to reducing the capacity by one-eighth compared to conventional products, it also features a dessert concept for one-person households by enhancing raw materials and emphasizing good taste.

The hotel industry is also fiercely marketing to single individuals. The bakery shop in the Westin Chosun Hotel, Seoul, was constructed to serve individuals. Normally, a single bakery sells a small piece of a traditional product. They perceive the psychology of honjok where individual like to enjoy themselves alone. There are also hotels that launch room packages for the Honjok. It is a product that is priced at more reasonable prices than conventional room packages so that one can concentrate on a perfect rest. It also operates the homme style packages for men. Standard room, one night rooms, one all-water buffet, and one sauna are included.

In the consumer electronics market, one-person household products are becoming popular. Honjok usually live in one room so it is preferable in a small space to have equipment of a convenient size. Compared to the average household, the cost of washing clothes is burdensome for the relatively small amount of laundry. Also, the smell of the clothes spread through the laundry. LG Electronics introduced a mini drum washing machine that is useful for cleaning small amounts of laundry, such as underwear and socks. In particular, the mini drum washing machine is gaining popularity with people who live alone because it can wash and dry in 17 minutes.

As the recent trend of single-person households spreads, there is a tendency to increase the development of products aimed at single-person households in many areas.

== Trend ==
According to the NSO, the number of one-person households in the country has continued to increase since 2017. It predicts the number of one-person households in the nation will be the highest in the country with a total of 36.3% of the total.

In 2018, Korea trend published by the Korea Economic Daily, honjok culture continues to increase and evolve. It also shows that the importance of using the term 'one-person system' beyond the one-person household increases. Honjok is expected to grow because it is combined with the growth of the 'solo economy' and the trends that people who are called 'YOLO' are boldly consuming their interests.

According to the survey of Embrain, the ratio of people who went to coffee shops alone, which was 14% in 2009, increased to 30% this year. Seven out of ten people have experienced honbap. Also, 74% of respondents said they were willing to use honbap restaurants.
