= Moon Pie =

American snack cakes

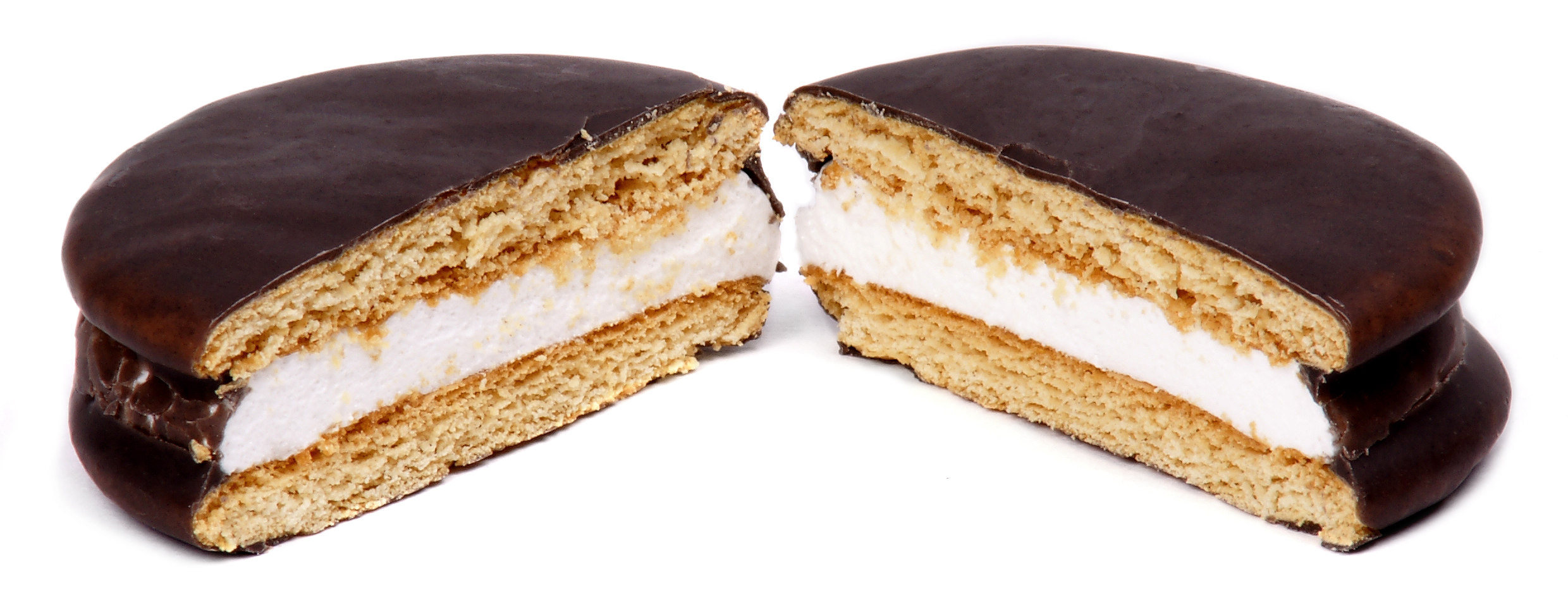
- Alternative names: MoonPie
- Type: Cookie
- Course: Dessert
- Place of origin: United States of America
- Region or state: Tennessee
- Invented: April 29, 1917; 109 years ago
- Main ingredients: Graham cracker cookies, marshmallow, flavored coating

A Moon Pie is an American snack, popular across much of the United States, which consists of two round Graham crackers, with marshmallow filling in the center, dipped in a flavored coating. The snack is often associated with the cuisine of the Southern United States, where they are traditionally accompanied by an RC Cola. Today, MoonPies are made by Chattanooga Bakery, Inc., a privately held, family-owned bakery in Chattanooga, Tennessee.

The traditional pie is approximately 4 inches (10 cm) in diameter. A smaller version, called a Mini Moon Pie, is approximately half the weight, and a double-decker Moon Pie of the traditional diameter features a third cookie and a second layer of marshmallow. The five primary flavors are chocolate, vanilla, banana, strawberry, and salted caramel. Coconut appears seasonally during the Mardi Gras parading season. Lemon, Blueberry, and Pumpkin Spice also appear seasonally throughout the year.

== History ==
According to Chattanooga Bakery, they came up with the idea for Moon Pies when a traveling salesman for the company asked a Kentucky coal miner what kind of snack he would like to eat, and the miner requested something with graham crackers and marshmallows. Popular folklore, repeated and encouraged by the Chattanooga Bakery itself, states the miner then asked that the snack be "as big as the Moon", which inspired the name "moon pie".

The company celebrated its centennial with a "My Favorite MoonPie Memory" contest. The grand prize was a 100-year supply of Moon Pies. A military veteran, Christopher Priest from Rockford, Michigan, won the contest. The company also took a wrapped Winnebago across the country in the fall, thanking its top customers and attending various sporting events and festivals.

In September 2017, as part of its centennial, MoonPie returned to its original recipe, replacing high-fructose corn syrup with sugar and removing preservatives and artificial colors and flavors.

In 2020, the company released pumpkin spice double-decker MoonPie as well as mini MoonPies.

The brand is known for its eccentric Twitter presence.

In 2024, Mast General Store began selling Over the Moon candy bars.

== Festivals and customs ==
=== Association with RC Cola ===
There is a custom of eating Moon Pies with RC Cola, although the origin of this is unknown. It is likely that their inexpensive prices, combined with their larger serving sizes, contributed to establishing this combination as the "working man's lunch." The popularity of this combination was celebrated in a popular song of the 1950s by Big Bill Lister titled "Gimme an RC Cola and a Moon Pie." In 1973, NRBQ had a minor hit with the song "An RC Cola and a Moon Pie."

An annual RC Cola and Moon Pie Festival are celebrated in Bell Buckle, Tennessee, and a Moon Pie eating contest is held in Bessemer, Alabama.

In the 1994 song "Lifestyles of the Not So Rich and Famous" by country artist Tracy Byrd, a line says "Our champagne and caviar is an RC Cola and a Moon Pie."

Lyrics in the 1976 song "Junk Food Junkie" by Larry Groce include: "And I pull out some Fritos corn chips/Dr. Pepper and an Ole Moon Pie / Then I sit back in glorious expectation / Of a natural junk food high."

In the 1999 film The Green Mile, a character named Toot is drinking a glass bottle of RC Cola, and when he is about to eat his Moon Pie, a death row inmate named Wild Bill offers him a nickel for his Moon Pie.

=== In Mobile, Alabama ===
The Moon Pie became a traditional "throw" (an item thrown from a parade float into the crowd) of Mardi Gras "krewes" (parade participants) in Mobile, Alabama during 1956, followed by other communities along the Northwest Florida and Mississippi Gulf Coast. The westernmost outpost of the MoonPie as an important Carnival throw is Slidell, Louisiana, which has a parade by "The Krewe of Mona Lisa and MoonPie". Also, in the town of Oneonta, Alabama, there is a MoonPie eating contest started by Wal-Mart employee John Love when he inadvertently ordered too many. This anecdote was featured in Sam Walton's autobiography, Made in America.

Since New Year's Eve 2008, the city of Mobile, Alabama has been lowering a 12-foot-tall (3.7 m) lighted mechanical Moon Pie to celebrate the coming of the new year. The giant Moon Pie descends the 34-story RSA BankTrust building at the stroke of midnight. Every New Year's Eve, the world's largest Moon Pie is cut and served to the public as part of the festivities. It weighs 55 pounds (25 kg) and contains 45,000 calories (190 kJ).

== Ingredients ==
Moon Pie
Nutritional value per 100g
- Energy: 385 kcal (1,610 kJ)
- Carbohydrates: 70.51g
- Sugars: 34.62
- Dietary fiber: 1.3g
- Fat: 8.97g
- Saturated: 6.41 g
- Protein: 5.13g
Vitamins and minerals
Minerals	Quantity %DV^{†}
Iron	10% 1.85 mg
Sodium	13% 295 mg
- Full link to USDA National Nutrient Database
- ^{†}Percentages estimated using US recommendations for adults.

Enriched wheat flour (niacin, reduced iron, thiamine mononitrate, riboflavin, folic acid), corn syrup, sugar, vegetable shortening (contains partially hydrogenated soybean oil, cottonseed oil, coconut oil, palm kernel oil or palm oil), soy flour, dutched cocoa powder (processed with alkali), (natural) cocoa powder, gelatin, baking soda, lecithin, salt, artificial flavoring, sodium sulfite.

Other flavors (such as banana, vanilla, strawberry, or orange) might have different nutritional content.

=== Flavors ===
Single-decker

- Salted Caramel
- Banana
- Vanilla
- Chocolate
- Strawberry
- Butterscotch

Double-decker

- Salted Caramel
- Banana
- Chocolate
- Lemon (discontinued)
- Orange (discontinued)
- Vanilla
- Pumpkin Spice

Minis

- Salted Caramel
- Strawberry
- Banana
- Vanilla
- Chocolate
- Coconut
- Pumpkin Spice
- Lemon
- Once in a Blue Moon (Blueberry) (introduced June 2023)

Moon Pie Crunch

- Peanut Butter
- Mint

== Similar products ==
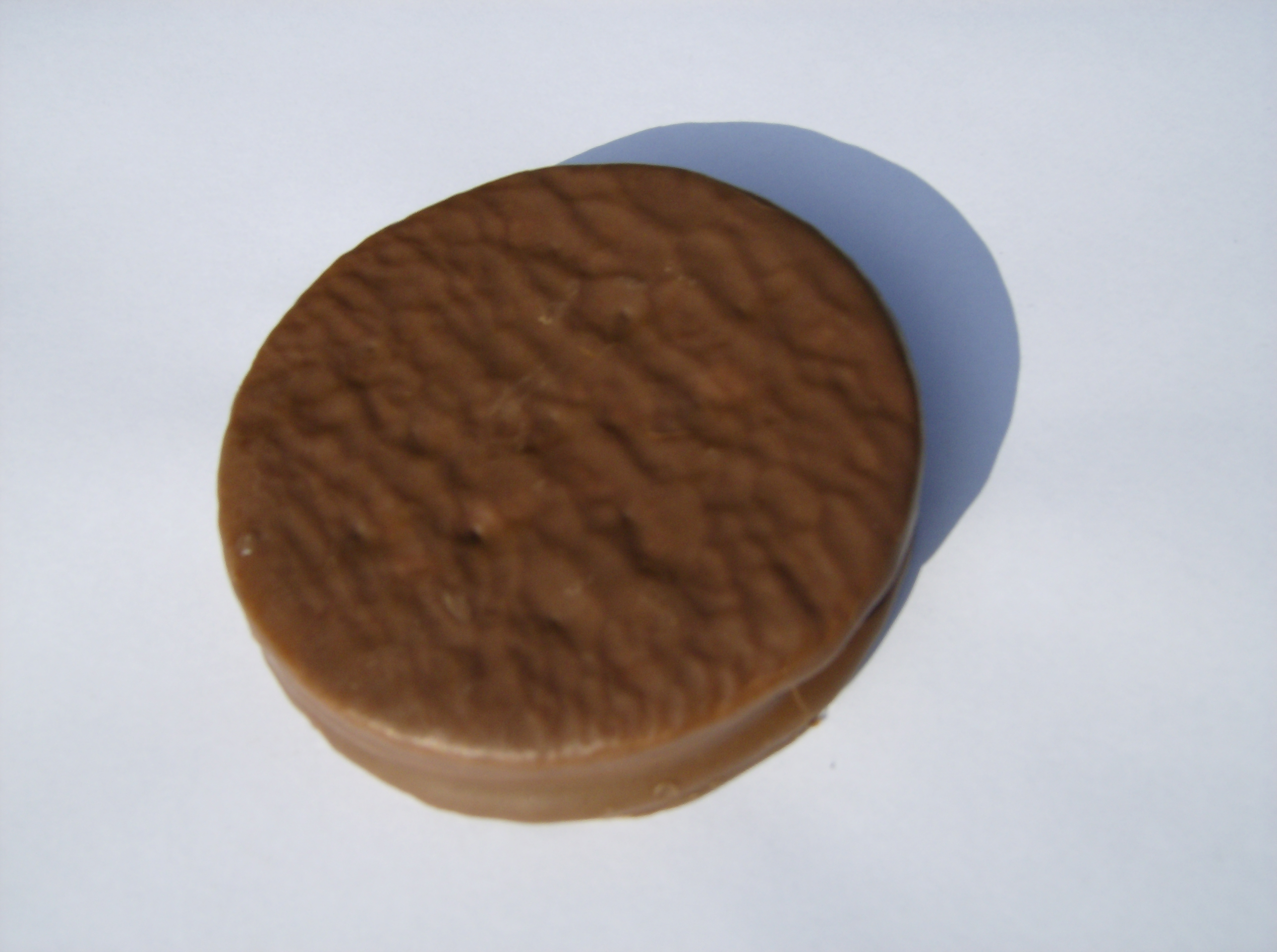
Wagon Wheels are similar to Moon Pies and are found in the United Kingdom, Australia, and Canada.

In the northern areas of the U.S., a similar product exists called a "Scooter Pie" and also a single-cracker marshmallow cookie called "Mallomars." Little Debbie also makes what they call "Marshmallow Pies," which are nearly identical to the moon pies. In the United Kingdom, Australia, and Canada, a similar product is called "Wagon Wheels."

In South Korea, the very similar "Choco Pie" is produced by several companies, including the Lotte Confectionery. In Japan, there is the smaller-sized "Angel Pies" by Morinaga, as well as a brand of "Choco pie" that is similar, as are "Mamut" (Spanish for "Mammoth", sold by Gamesa), and "Rocko" (marketed by Marinela, which incorporates strawberry jelly in the snack) in Mexico, and there are several other minor brands as well.

The "Halley" and "Bimbo" pies sold in Turkey and Egypt, respectively, are similar. In Argentina, a similar treat is "Alfajor," and more than 20 brands marketed as "alfajores" are very popular. Nestlé manufactures similar sweets called "Holiday," which are available in the Balkan countries.

== See also ==
- Chocolate-coated marshmallow treats
- Fluffernutter, another kind of marshmallow creme-based sandwich
- S'more
- Whoopie pie
