= 60 Minute Makeover =

- Also known as: Peter Andre's 60 Minute Makeover
- Presented by: Claire Sweeney; Terri Dwyer; Catherine Gee; Peter Andre
- Narrated by: Alex Hall; Lee Williams; Catherine Gee
- Country of origin: United Kingdom
- Original language: English
- No. of series: 12
- No. of episodes: 594

Production
- Running time: 60 minutes (including adverts)
- Production company: Shiver Productions

Original release
- Network: ITV
- Release: 19 April 2004 – 19 December 2014
- Network: Quest Red
- Release: 5 February – 2 March 2018

60 Minute Makeover is a British home interior design television programme broadcast on ITV, and later by Quest Red. In 2013, the show's name changed to reflect the change in presenter to Peter Andre.

== Format ==
The challenge was to redecorate and makeover a number of rooms in a house in 1 hour. The house owner is usually nominated by a relative or friend for a secret visit by the 60 Minute Makeover team who remodel their house whilst they are away. On returning, the owners are given a tour of their remodelled rooms by the host. The cost of the makeover is stated at the end of each show. The house owner earning the makeover is often in need of help due to illness or difficult times.

== Presenters and designers ==
=== Presenters ===
- Claire Sweeney (2004–2006)
- Terri Dwyer (2007–2009)
- Linda Barker (2010)
- Catherine Gee (2011–2012)
- Peter Andre (2013–2014, 2018)

Claire Sweeney was the original host, presenting the programme for several series before Terri Dwyer took over. In series 7, 60 Minute Makeover was fronted and timed by the designer who also acted as presenter with and narration provided by Alex Hall, Lee Williams and Catherine Gee. From series 7 to 12, the number of rooms made over has been reduced from 4 to 3, to cut production costs.

In spring 2011, the programme returned to its original format and was given a new look with Catherine Gee as the new host for series 8 with the designers once again concentrating on remodeling the rooms as prior to series 7. The team decorated three rooms per show. Gee also provided the narration for the show for these two series.

In 2013, singer and reality TV star Peter Andre took over as the main presenter. The show was rebranded as Peter Andre's 60 Minute Makeover, beginning on 11 November 2013.

=== Designers ===
- John Amabile
- Linda Barker
- Ann Hazell
- Souki Hildreth
- Alison Cork
- Rowena Johnson
- Ben Hillman
- Leah Hughes
- Julia Kendell
- Carl Machin
- Richard Randall
- Kathryn Rayward
- Sophie Robinson
- Hannah Sandling
- Derek Taylor
- Scott Waldron

== Transmissions ==
Series	Start date	End date	Episodes
1	19 April 2004	4 June 2004	33
2	6 September 2004	11 February 2005	50
3	10 April 2006	28 July 2006	30
4	2 January 2007	9 February 2007	30
4	6 April 2007		30
5	5 November 2007	12 May 2008	70
6	1 September 2008	15 June 2009	80
7	7 September 2009	29 October 2010	141
8	21 March 2011	19 May 2011	40
9	26 March 2012	23 May 2012	40
10	11 November 2013	20 December 2013	30
11	10 November 2014	19 December 2014	30
12	5 February 2018	2 March 2018	20

== Awards ==
Year	Group	Award	Result
2010	Broadcast Awards	Best Daytime Programme	Nominated

== International broadcasts ==
Country	Name	Channel	Air slot
Australia	60 Minute Makeover	Lifestyle Home	Weekdays (16:30)
China	60 Minute Makeover	ICS	Weeknights (19:00)
Ireland	60 Minute Makeover	UTV Ireland	Weekdays (16:30)
Netherlands	60 Minute Makeover	SBS6	Weekdays (15:20)
New Zealand	60 Minute Makeover	TVNZ 1 Living	Weekdays (11:00)
Spain	60 Minute Makeover	Ten	Weekdays (11:05)
United States	60 Minute Makeover	Dabl	Weeknights (19:00 ET)
