= Nicki Shields =

British television presenter (born 1985)

- Born: Nicola Shields; 1 November 1985 (age 40)
- Education: University of Bristol
- Occupation: Television presenter

Nicola Shields (born 1 November 1985) is a British television presenter best known as the Formula E pit lane reporter. A biological sciences graduate of the University of Bristol, she got a job for UBS which she left after one year to found the social media company Starcount.com. Shields began her presenting and reporting career in 2012 and her work has included the BBC One show Escape to the Country and Supercharged on CNN International, and most recently CNNI's Saved by the Future.

== Biography ==
Shields was born in 1985 and was raised in Twickenham. She has one brother. Shields spent time at the family's countryside farm in Yorkshire during the holidays. She was educated at the Lady Eleanor Holles School. Shields was exposed to motor racing from an early age as she often watched Formula One with her father and competed in go-kart races. Her childhood dream was to race in the series but realised that this was not feasible as she became older. Shields studied biological sciences at the University of Bristol, specialising on environmental science. The first job she got upon graduating was with the financial services company UBS in the City of London.

Shields left UBS after one year and founded Starcount, a social media data analytics device. She began presenting and reporting at technology and science shows in 2012 which included The Gadget Show Live, the International Confex and the Intel Solutions Summit. The following year Shields began acting as one of the presenters of the BBC One property-buying programme Escape to the Country. That same year she reported from the Willis Resilience Expedition to Antarctica where she investigated climate change and sustainability. Shields was also involved in the production of a programme about electric vehicles. Shields presented for Goodwood TV at the 72nd Members Meeting and Motors TV in 2014.

In early 2014 she contacted Aurora Media and was invited for screen tests for the company's television coverage of the electric motor racing series Formula E. Shields was confirmed as the series pit lane reporter in April of that year. She later said that she had to get involved upon hearing about the series from a contact at Renault as it consisted of two of her main hobbies, cars and science. Shields is the host of the CNN International technology and electric racing show Supercharged which first aired on 13 February 2016, and of Saved by the Future. She was announced as the host of the LowCVP Low Carbon Champions Awards which took place on 13 September. Shields's other work include hosting the Goodwood Festival of Speed on ITV4 and presented the Formula Kart Stars on Sky Sports F1. She has written articles for The Times, London Evening Standard and CNN.com, and commentated on Esports events such as the Ferrari eSports series, the Formula E Race at Home Challenge and the Fordzilla eSports Cup.

In October 2020, she was named an ambassador of the Fédération Internationale de l'Automobile's The Girls on Track UK science, technology, engineering, and mathematics and motorsport initiative for school-age girls. In August 2025 she became the lead presenter of ITV 4's British Touring Car Championship after Steve Rider's retirement.

== Personal life ==
In September 2014, she married her partner of four years Mark Sainthill in a ceremony held in Ibiza. Her first child, a boy, due to be born in June 2019, was born three weeks early via caesarean section in May. She has another son and a daughter.
