= Escape to the Country =

British reality television series (2002–)

- Genre: Reality
- Created by: Jason Wilton
- Presented by: See below
- Music by: John Wygens
- Country of origin: United Kingdom
- Original language: English
- No. of series: 27
- No. of episodes: 1,217

Production
- Executive producers: John Comerford; Emma Smith (Series Editor)
- Producers: Titus Ogilvy (Series producer)
- Running time: 45–60 minutes
- Production companies: Talkback (2002–2006); Talkback Thames (2006–2012); Boundless Productions (2012–2021); Naked West (since 2021)

Original release
- Network: BBC One; BBC Two
- Release: 14 October 2002 – present

Related
- I Escaped to the Country; Celebrity Escape to the Country; Escape to the Continent; Escape to the Perfect Town; Escape from the City (Australia); Greatest Escapes to the Country

Escape to the Country is a British daytime television property-buying/real estate programme that has been on the air since 14 October 2002. The show was originally produced by Talkback Thames and first aired on BBC One, with repeats on BBC Two. It has gained international syndication. Production later moved to Naked West, a division of Fremantle Media. The programme is commonly referred to as "Escape" among viewers.

The show consistently ranks as the top-rated programme in its daytime time slot on BBC One, and has a significant global social media presence.

== Format ==
The show features potential home buyers searching for their dream homes in rural UK areas. The buyers view three or four properties for sale, including a "mystery house," in their chosen county or region. The houses they visit can include rentals, new-builds, kit-homes, market town addresses, renovation projects, or even plots of land with potential for building.

After inspecting each house, the presenter asks the buyers to guess the asking price before revealing it. Episodes also feature countryside imagery, information about the counties, towns, and villages, and interviews with local residents of various ages and backgrounds to gather their opinions about the area. At the end of each episode, the buyers are asked to choose their favourite property and discuss their plans for potentially purchasing it. Updates on their progress may be provided in subsequent episodes.

In 2021, the show underwent significant changes to reflect modern-day countryside living and address contemporary rural issues. Series Editor Emma Smith and Series Producer Titus Ogilvy spearheaded these changes, which included interstitial segments highlighting rural culture, the environment, sustainability, and the impact of climate change on the countryside. Many episodes now feature "mini escapes," where viewers submit self-filmed footage telling the story of their own escape to the country.

The majority of the programmes are of 45-minute duration featuring three homes and a number of short interviews with local residents. Occasionally, a longer 60-minute programme featuring four homes is shown. A 30-minute version of the three home format is sometimes broadcast with the interviews of local residents edited out. Repeat episodes are shown BBC1 or BBC2 and older episodes are shown on HGTV, Really and free streaming service Pluto TV.

== History ==
=== Series 1 to 5 ===
Produced by Talkback UK, and aired from 2002, the premise of the show is that a family wishes to relocate from their current city home to a more peaceful and rural retreat. It is then the job of the show's presenter to find four houses for the family to view via laptop computer in their own homes. The family must then choose two out of the four houses to go and view for themselves. In addition, there is also the option of choosing the presenter's 'mystery house'.

Series 3 included a Catherine Gee episode starring actor/writer Ian Murphy, who was relocating from Nottingham to Lancaster.

=== Series 6 to 9 ===
The format of the show changed in series 6 to accommodate viewer demand to see more houses and more local information. Contributors now view all four houses, of which the fourth is the mystery house. The mystery house usually has something unique about it that will either make the contributors fall in love with or hate it. Added to the show is a taster day in which the contributors sample local delights, gain historical knowledge and visit local attractions to get a feel for the area they are planning to move to. Series 6 aired in August 2007 on BBC One, while series 7 and 8 aired back-to-back in autumn 2008. Series 9 began on 23 February in a new slot of 15:45 on BBC Two.

=== Series 10 to 12 ===
The format was modified again: the number of properties the couples viewed was reduced to three, with the third being the mystery house. Series 12 consisted of 75 shows and was broadcast from November 2011 on BBC Two with new title and credit sequences.

=== Series 13 to 20 ===
Series 13 premiered on 3 September 2012 on BBC One, followed by a further series each year; Series 20 began in late 2019.

In 2019, Series 19 was being broadcast and BBC One was re-running episodes of Series 18 on a daily basis. Presenters for these series included Sonali Shah, Jonnie Irwin, Ginny Buckley, Jules Hudson, Alistair Appleton, Margherita Taylor, and Nicki Chapman. For Series 19 the following credits were provided:

- Series Producers: Eleanor Brocklehurst and Emma Smith
- Executive Producer: John Comerford
- Production company: FremantleMedia (Boundless Productions)

=== Series 21 to 27 ===
Series 21 premiered on 7 September 2020 on BBC One. Briony May Williams and Chris Bavin joined the presenting team.

Series 22 premiered on 27 September 2021 on BBC One. After a seven-year hiatus, Denise Nurse returned to the presenting team.

Series 23 premiered on 22 August 2022 on BBC One.

Series 24 premiered on 28 August 2023 on BBC One.

Series 25 premiered on 27 August 2024 on BBC One.

Series 26 premiered on 18 August 2025 on BBC One. Richie Anderson joined the presenting team.

Series 27 premiered on 18 May 2026.

The following credits were provided:

- Series Producer: Titus Ogilvy
- Series Editor: Emma Smith
- Executive Producer: John Comerford
- Production Company: Fremantle (Naked West)

== Presenters ==
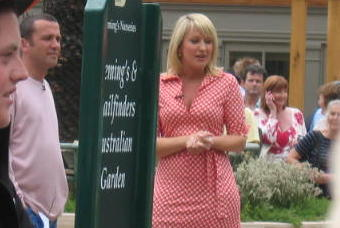
Nicki Chapman, one of the hosts of Escape to the Country

The current presenters are:

- Alistair Appleton (2007–)
- Jules Hudson (2007–)
- Denise Nurse (2008–2015, 2022–)
- Nicki Chapman (2009–)
- Sonali Shah (2014–)
- Ginny Buckley (2015–)
- Steve Brown (2021–)
- Briony May Williams (2022–)
- Richie Anderson (2025–)

=== Former presenters ===
- Catherine Gee (2002–2007)
- Nick Page (2002)
- Melissa Porter (2007)
- Jonnie Irwin (2010–2023)
- Aled Jones (2009–2013)
- Anita Rani (2014–2015)
- Nicki Shields (2013–2014)
- Margherita Taylor (2016–2022)
- Tim Vincent (2008–2009)
- Chris Bavin (2022)

== Spin-off and related shows ==
A subsequent programme, I Escaped to the Country, revisits potential buyers who had appeared on the primary series. By January 2025, nine series of this programme had been shown.

A celebrity edition of the programme, Celebrity Escape to the Country finds properties for famous personalities. By March 2026, three series of this programme had been shown.

A related series featuring the same concept and some of the same presenters, but filmed in other countries, Escape to the Continent, was made for the BBC by Boundless Productions. Two series were filmed and shown in 2016/17.

From 2019, the BBC showed two series of a spinoff, Escape To the Perfect Town, about towns and cities instead of rural villages.

A further related series, Greatest Escapes to the Country, looking back at homes featured in the primary series, was broadcast on BBC Two in 2020.

=== Australian version ===
Escape from the City is an Australian version of the show produced by Fremantle Media Australia, which aired on ABC TV from 3 January 2019. It is presented by Jane Hall, Simon Marnie, Bryce Holdaway, Del Irani and Dean Ipaviz.

== International broadcasts ==
In Australia, Escape to the Country airs on Seven Network's free-to-air digital channel 7TWO, and the Lifestyle Channel on Foxtel Subscription TV.

In Canada, it is seen on CTV Life Channel, as well as CBC. In Sweden, it airs on TV8.

In the Netherlands, Escape to the Country has been broadcast as Droomhuis op het Platteland (Dutch for "Dreamhouse on the countryside") since April 2011 on SBS6, and is available on BBC channels distributed by cable operators. It is mentioned in the novel The Detour by Dutch author Gerbrand Bakker.

In the United States, it was available on the Netflix online streaming service in 2017, but has since been discontinued. As of March 2020, a limited number of episodes were available for streaming on Amazon Prime Video, in conjunction with IMDbTV. On Dabl, two episodes are broadcast weekday afternoons and rerun the same evening; as of 29 December 2023, Dabl has changed its format, and no longer broadcasts Escape to the Country.

It is also featured on a dedicated TV channel on Samsung TV Plus, running episodes 24 hours per day, back to back, seven days a week.

== DVD releases ==
On 5 March 2014, two DVDs of the series were released in Australia by Shock Entertainment. Titled Series 20 - Part 1 and Series 20 - Part 2, the two DVD box sets had a total of 19 discs. A further three disc set was released on 6 August 2014, a Best Of Series 20.
