= Catherine Gee =

English television presenter and property expert (born 1967)

- Born: 1 January 1967 (age 59); England
- Occupations: Television presenter, property expert, magazine editor
- Years active: 1995–present
- Children: 2

Catherine Gee (born 1 January 1967) is an English television presenter and property expert.

In March 2011, Gee took over as the host of the ITV daytime makeover show 60 Minute Makeover. Prior to this she was best known for presenting the BBC relocation programme, Escape to the Country and for being the location presenter on the long-running BBC Two panel game Through the Keyhole in the mid 2000s.

== Early life and media career ==
Gee has had a range of careers including working as a personal chef in the City, an estate agent before she joined Country Living as an assistant editor in 1995. It was whilst she was Head of Shows, organising such events as the Country Living Fairs, that in 1999 she became involved in the magazine's first matchmaking campaign for farmers The Farmer Wants a Wife. She ran the second campaign which was televised by Thames Television in some ITV regions in 2001 and was nominated for a BAFTA in 2002.

It was as a result of this that she was spotted and approached by Talkback Productions to present, firstly, their new BBC2 property relocation show Escape to the Country in 2002, and then to replace Loyd Grossman in 2004 as Sir David Frost's location presenter on the long-running Through the Keyhole. She also presents a UKTV Style show called A Place by the Sea, and No Place Like Home? on the ITV network in the UK. In 2007, she presented Fantasy Homes by the Sea.

Gee subsequently returned to working for Country Living, as of 2015 working as curator of shows, including the Country Living Fairs held at the Business Design Centre, Islington.
