= Briony May Williams =

British celebrity chef (born 1984 (Confirmed on TheCrispCast))

- Born: 1984 or 1985 (age 41–42)
- Occupations: Television baker and presenter
- Years active: 2018–present
- Known for: The Great British Bake Off (series 9); Food Unwrapped; Escape to the Country

Briony May Williams (born 1984 or 1985) is a British celebrity chef and presenter. She appeared on series 9 of The Great British Bake Off in 2018, finishing fourth. She presents the cooking show Food Unwrapped and the reality housing show Escape to the Country, and writes recipe columns for BristolLife and the supermarket Asda's Good Living.

== Personal life ==
Williams is from Bristol, England. She was born with a physical birth defect in her left hand, which stops after her wrist and thumb – she calls it her "little hand". Williams said that her family did not use the word disability due to stigma around the term. She had some specialised equipment, such as a recorder provided by the disability charity Reach that could be played one-handed, but learned to complete tasks like tying her shoelaces unaided. Williams attended an all-girls secondary school. Since her early 20s, she has experienced depression.

After studying Spanish and French at Durham University, she became a secondary school teacher in the same subjects, qualifying with a Postgraduate Certificate in Education (PGCE) from the University of Bristol. She met her husband Steve, a software engineer, online around 2010. Williams baked with her mother and grandmother as a child, but began taking it seriously in 2013, after she was diagnosed with polyendocrine metabolic ovarian syndrome (PMOS) and had to take time off work. She used YouTube tutorials, such as the ones by Cupcake Jemma, to gain baking knowledge. During this period, she also took up running. She had a daughter a couple of years later, and bakes with her. In 2017, she joined a local running community, This Mum Runs, and ran the Great Bristol Half Marathon that year.

== The Great British Bake Off ==
In 2018, Williams was a contestant on the ninth series of The Great British Bake Off, a television baking competition. She earned the weekly Star Baker accolade in Pastry Week after baking a pie themed around Alice in Wonderland. Eliminated in the semi-final, she finished fourth of 12. In 2019, she appeared on the Christmas special The Great Christmas Bake Off, winning the episode.

Williams told Bake Off producers that she did not want different accommodations due to her limb difference; after appearing on the show, she became more comfortable using the term disabled. At her request, her disability was not mentioned on the show. She later told Disability Horizons that it should "just be natural" to see disabled actors and presenters and that they should not be limited to disability-related topics. She found the production process—with filming at the weekend and practicing bakes during the week—very intense, and credited exercise with giving her the energy to progress far through the series. She said she "had no energy left" after the semi-final and suffered a chest infection that weekend.

== Post-Bake Off career ==
Williams is a presenter of Food Unwrapped for Channel 4. The series sees her travelling to research food and drink. She secured the role after being approached by producers, as the show was looking to expand its presenter line-up. In 2020, production was interrupted by the COVID-19 pandemic; she had been due to visit Austria in the week that the first UK lockdown came into force. Williams also presents Escape to the Country, a daytime reality programme about purchasing a house.

Williams has a recipe column in her local magazine BristolLife and the supermarket Asda's magazine Good Living. She has also made a number of other television appearances on children's shows, cooking shows, talk shows, panel shows and game shows.

== Charity work ==
Williams has served as an ambassador for the disability charities Reach and Paul's Place, the mental health charity Bristol Mind, and volunteered for Comic Relief and the disability sports event Superhero Series. She completed a 5 km run for Sport Relief.
