= Wagon Wheels =

Brand of sweet biscuit-based snack food

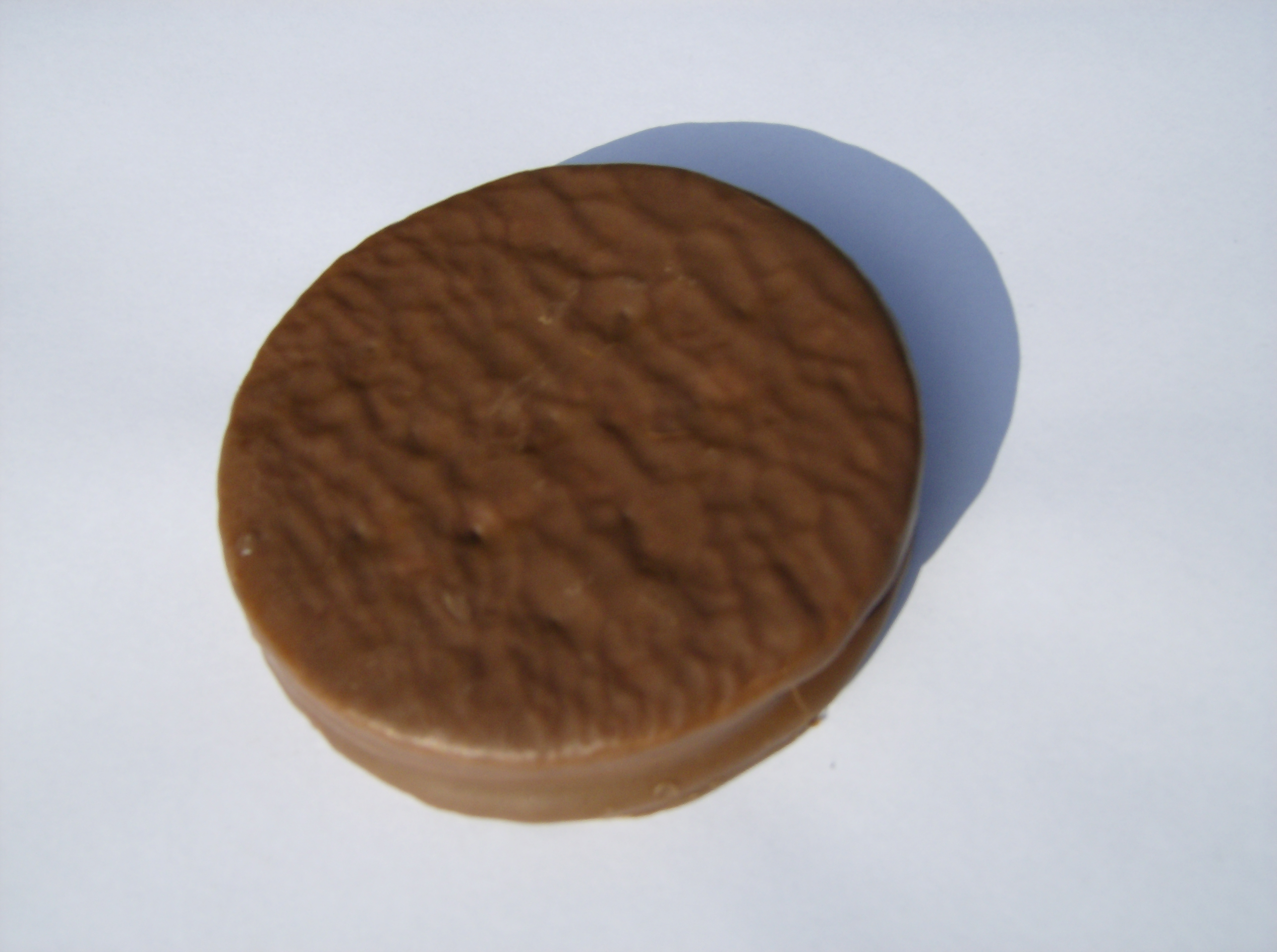
- Wagon Wheel
- Type: Snack food
- Place of origin: Australia, Canada, United Kingdom, New Zealand
- Created by: Arnott's Biscuits, Burton's Foods
- Invented: 1948; 78 years ago
- Main ingredients: Marshmallow, chocolate-flavoured coating
- Variations: Jammie; Toffee; Double Choc; Caramel; Banoffee; Orange

Wagon Wheels are a sweet snack food sold in the United Kingdom as well as other Commonwealth countries such as Australia, Canada, New Zealand, Malta and India. They are also sold in Ireland. They consist of two biscuits that form a sandwich with a marshmallow filling, and they are covered with a chocolate-flavoured coating.

Wagon Wheels were invented by William Peschardt, who sold the patent to Garry Weston, son of W. Garfield Weston. Garry Weston worked for his father's business in Australia before taking over his family's business in Sheffield, England. He placed two Marie biscuits around a marshmallow filling and covered it with chocolate. They were introduced in 1948. The name (originally "Weston Wagon Wheels") relates to the shape of the biscuits and capitalised on the Wild West, which was popular in mass media at the time.

== Production and size ==
In Australia, Wagon Wheels are now produced by Arnott's Biscuits. George Weston Foods Limited sold the brand to Arnott's in August 2003.

In the United Kingdom Wagon Wheels are produced and distributed by Burton's Foods who separated from the Weston family connection when they were sold out of Associated British Foods in 2000. The original factory which produced the biscuit was in Slough but during the early 1980s production was transferred to an updated and modern factory in Llantarnam in South Wales. Weston had been producing biscuits on the Slough site since 1934 and the Llantarnam site since 1938.

In Canada, Wagon Wheels were originally produced by McCormick's, however they are now under the Dare Foods Limited name. They come in Original, Fudge, Choco Cherry, and Raspberry flavours.

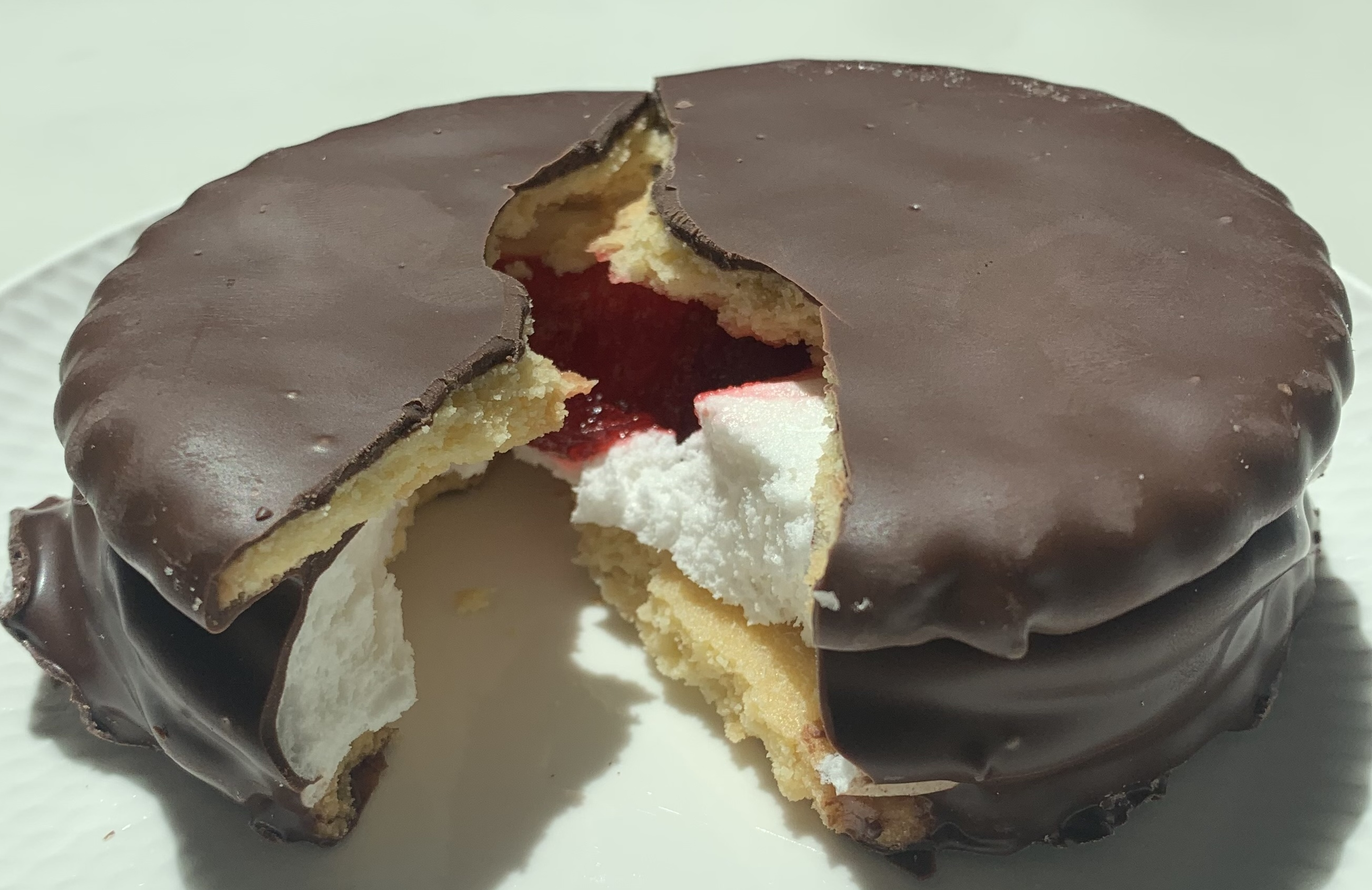
The inside of a Wagon Wheel

There have been many debates amongst fans of the biscuit about its size. Wagon Wheels have supposedly shrunk in size over time, but Burton's Foods Ltd has denied this. It has been suggested that the supposed shrinkage is due to an adult's childhood memory of eating a Wagon Wheel held in a much smaller hand; this argument is perhaps moot, as it does not explain why the modern Wagon Wheel appears to be fatter than the original. Furthermore, in Australia, Arnott's has stated that tray packs of Wagon Wheels were in fact 'Mini Wagon Wheels' and have re-released the original 48g Wagon Wheels.

As of 2006 the diameter of the Australian version is 88 mm (3.5 in), which is 14 mm (0.55 in) larger than the UK version; the UK version is thicker by 4 mm (0.16 in).

== In popular culture ==
Wagon Wheels are thrown into the audience by Berwick Kaler during the annual York Theatre Royal pantomime.

Wagon Wheels were chosen by Judge Paul Hollywood as the technical challenge for the first episode in series 9 of The Great British Bake Off.

Australian interviewer Annabel Crabb fabricated a batch of Wagon Wheels as her contribution to an interview with Prime Minister Anthony Albanese at The Lodge in her ABC series Kitchen Cabinet, first aired in July 2026. Albanese, who grew up near the Weston's biscuit factory, admitted to an aversion to the product.

== See also ==
- Alfajor
- Choco pie
- Chocolate-coated marshmallow treats – other similar products
- List of chocolate-covered foods
- Moon pie
- Sandwich cookie
- Weston family
