= Linda Barker =

English interior designer and television presenter

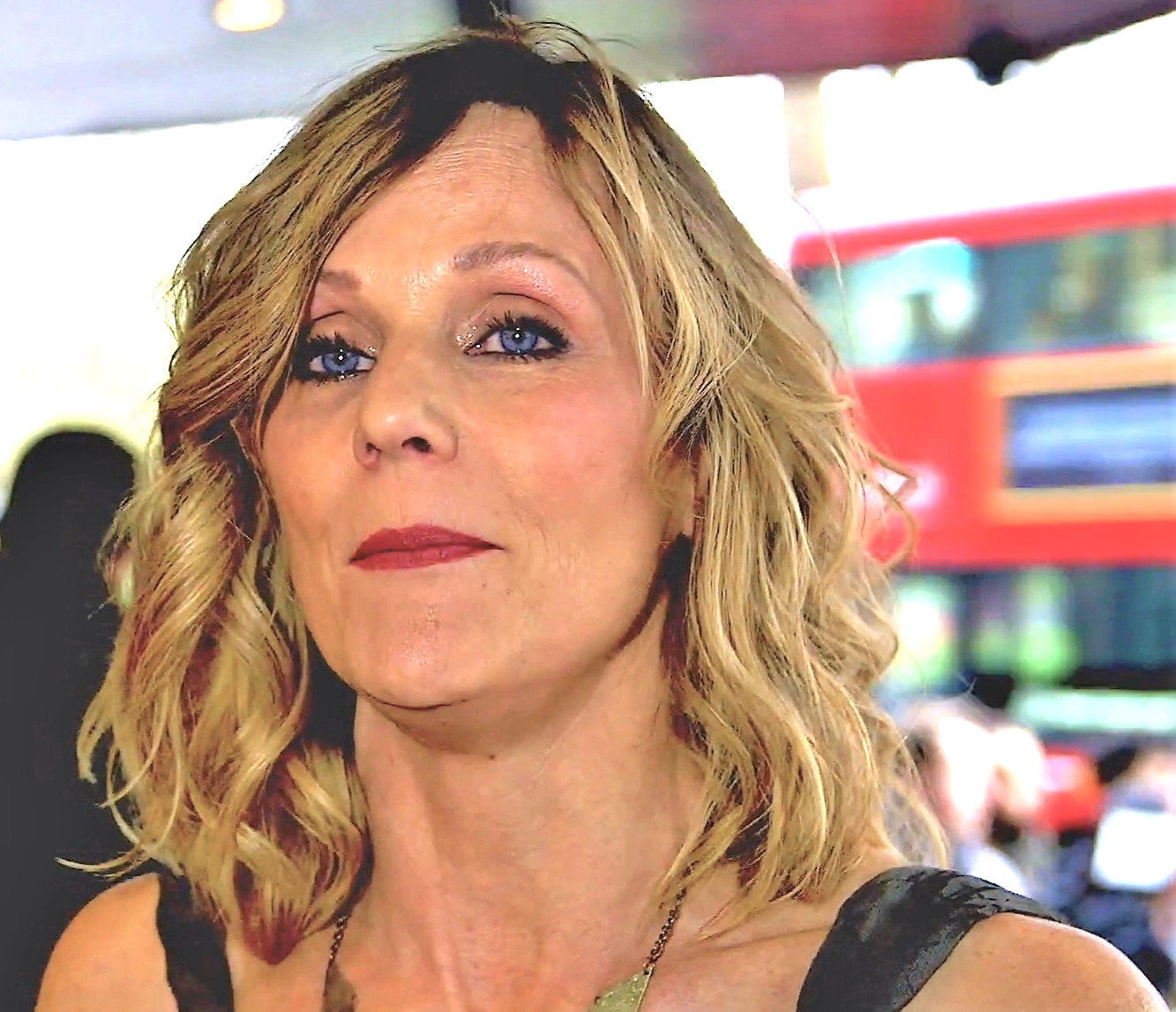
- Barker at The Asian Awards in 2019
- Born: 26 October 1961 (age 64); Shelf, West Riding of Yorkshire, England
- Known for: Interior design and television presenter
- Spouse: Chris Short
- Children: 1

Linda Barker (born 26 October 1961) is an English interior designer and television presenter.

== Education ==
Born in Shelf, on the outskirts of Halifax in the West Riding of Yorkshire, Barker was educated at Bradford Girls' Grammar School before studying fine art at the Surrey Institute of Art & Design in Farnham, now the University for the Creative Arts. She then did odd jobs in various areas including fashion, before settling into a career as an interior designer. An accomplished painter, she did up her flat in Battersea and was the subject of a House Beautiful magazine spread on interiors.

== Career ==
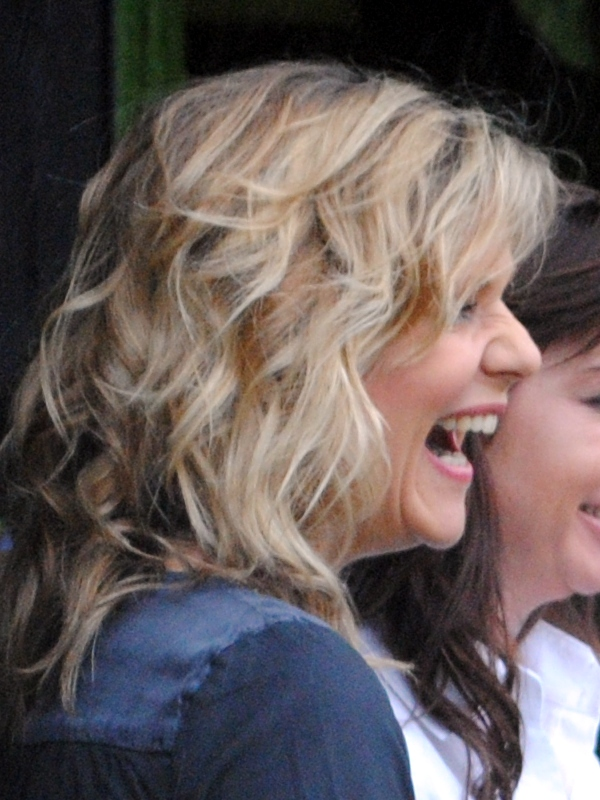
Barker in 2010

Barker began her work in television as a set designer, where she met her husband. She was one of the group of people including Laurence Llewelyn-Bowen approached by the BBC in 1996 to work on a television show called Changing Rooms as designers. In 2000, while working on Changing Rooms, Barker designed a set of suspended shelves to display contestant Clodagh’s antique teapot collection, which was worth more than £6,000. The shelves were filmed being installed and the teapots and a number of heavy books were placed on them; after filming stopped, the shelves collapsed, destroying the collection.

Barker also started co-presenting House Invaders in 1999, and co-presented a three-part special called Planet Christmas in 2001. After six years of Changing Rooms, restricted by the BBC's position on commercial endorsement and disappointed to be overlooked as a replacement presenter to Carol Smillie, she left the show.

Barker launched her more commercially focused career by appearing in the second series of the ITV reality show I'm a Celebrity... Get Me Out of Here!, on which she finished in third place on the final day.

Barker adopted a new personal image, being featured in lads' magazine shoots and making a yoga DVD. Commercially, she designed and advertised sofas for retailer DFS and cabins for Thomson Holidays. She also brought out her own wallpaper range with Crown. She began presenting series for ITV, including With A Little Help From My Friends, Building the Dream and a daytime lifestyle series, Under Construction.

In 2007 Barker took part in the CBBC children's show Hider in the House, as the hidden celebrity. Barker also appeared on a celebrity edition of Come Dine with Me, aired on 17 September 2008, alongside Peter Stringfellow, Michelle Heaton and Lee Ryan. Linda finished in joint first place with Ryan, both of whom scored 26 points.

In 2009 she joined the design team on the ITV daytime series 60 Minute Makeover.

In 2013, Barker went on to take part in Splash!, ITV's celebrity diving show with Olympic diver Tom Daley as her mentor. She finished in third place. Barker, who wore a bikini throughout the series, received widespread admiration for her slim, toned figure and became an ambassador for Playtex shortly after.

In 2017, she presented The Home Game, a new daytime series for ITV.

Today Barker writes, publishes design books and writes a column for the weekend Daily Express magazine.

In April 2021, Barker launched a collection of fabrics, curtains and blinds with home furnishings retailer Terrys under the brand name "Linda Barker Home".

== Personal life ==
She is married to TV executive Chris Short, and the couple have a daughter and two dogs. The family currently lives between Battersea London and the East Riding of Yorkshire.
