= Denise Nurse =

British entrepreneur, lawyer and television presenter (born 1976)

- Born: Denise Bernadette Nurse; 8 July 1976 (age 50)
- Education: University of Liverpool; University of Law
- Occupations: Solicitor; entrepreneur; television presenter/personality; weather forecaster

Denise Bernadette Nurse (born 8 July 1976) is a British entrepreneur, lawyer and television presenter.

== Education ==
Denise Nurse studied Law and graduated from the University of Liverpool in 1997. She then studied at University of Law for her professional degrees.

== Professional career ==
Denise Nurse was an assistant solicitor for Charles Russell LLP from 1998 and qualified in 2000.

As a solicitor she worked under the title of inhouse counsel for BSkyB from 2001.

In 2007, she established alternative law firm Halebury with her business partner Janvi Patel. Denise is a regular speaker at industry events talking about entrepreneurship, flexible working and law firm structures.

Denise Nurse was a trustee of Futureversity from 2009 to 2012. She was later appointed as a board member on Practical Law's In-house Consultation Board.

== Broadcasting career ==
While working for BSkyB, Nurse won a Sky Talent competition set up by Dawn Airey to discover fresh presenting talent. Out of thousands of Sky employees her peers voted her the best presenter. She made her debut in March 2005 on Sky Weather and also presented forecasts for Channel 5 until February 2012.

She has presented for Sky Travel from the Caribbean and other exotic locations. In 2008 she became a presenter on BBC's Escape to the Country. She has also advised on consumer and legal issues on the BBC's Rip Off Britain.

== Personal life ==
In an interview in September 2016, Nurse stated she got married in 2015, and had a family with two stepchildren. She halted her broadcasting career when she had a son.
