= Choco pie =

Snack cookie with chocolate coating

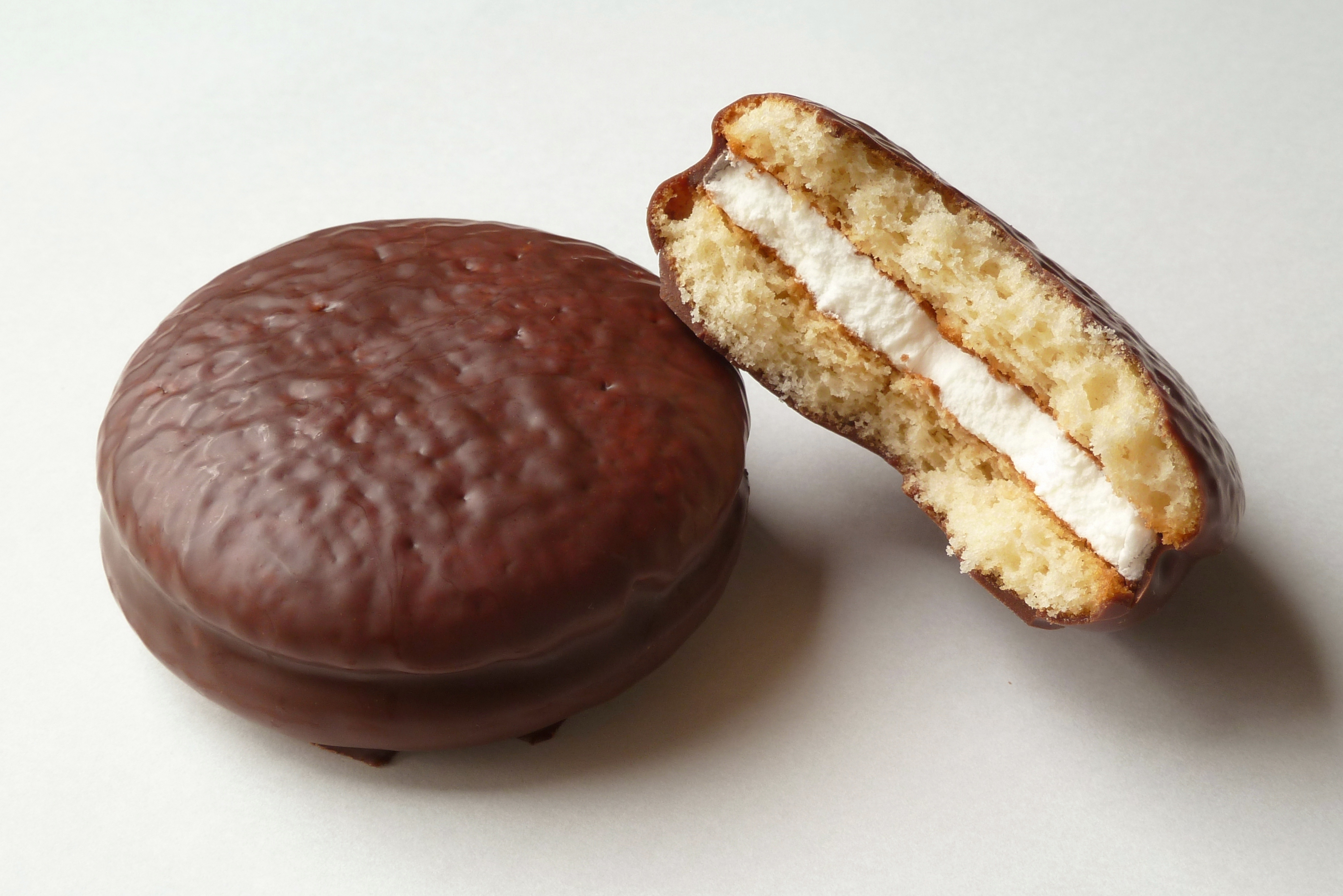
- Alternative names: Wagon Wheels, Moon Pie
- Type: Snack cake
- Place of origin: United States
- Region or state: Worldwide
- Invented: 1917; 108 years ago

A choco pie is a snack cake consisting of two small round layers of cake with marshmallow filling and a chocolate covering. The term originated in the United States but is now also used widely in South Korea, Japan, and countries to which it exports, and many other countries as either a brand name or a generic term. Names for similar confections in other places include chocolate marshmallow pie, Wagon Wheels, angel pie (in Japan), and moon pie.

== History ==
Variations of the original go back to as far as 1917 in the southern United States. In 1929, Chattanooga Bakery created the Moon Pie with marshmallow filling and Graham crackers for local miners in Chattanooga, Tennessee.

In 1961, a Japanese confectionery company Morinaga & Company started selling Angel Pie (エンゼルパイ, Enzeru Pai) which was developed with reference to Scooter Pie, a version of Moon Pie.

In 1973, a member of the R&D team of the Korean firm Tongyang Confectionery visited a hotel in Georgia, US, and was inspired by the chocolate-coated sweets available in the hotel's restaurant. He returned to South Korea and began experimenting with a chocolate biscuit cake, creating the "choco pie" as it is known to South Koreans. The name "Choco Pie"(초코 파이) became popular when Tongyang first released the Orion Choco Pie, and was well received by South Korean children, as well as the elderly, because of its affordable price and white marshmallow filling. Tongyang Confectionery later renamed the company Orion Confectionery thanks to the success of the Orion Choco Pie brand.

In 1979, Lotte Confectionery began to sell a similar confection. When Lotte Confectionery put the Lotte Choco Pie on the market, it chose to spell the prefix slightly differently in Hangul from how Tongyang was spelling it. Tongyang had been using "쵸" ("Chyo"), while Lotte began using "초" ("Cho"). Haitai and Crown Confectionery also began selling their own versions of choco pies. Lotte also began selling as Choco Pie in Japan in 1983.

In 1999, after many years of sales of different "Choco Pie" products, Tongyang (Orion) filed a lawsuit against Lotte for their use of the term "Choco Pie", claiming that the name was their intellectual property. The court ruled, however, that Tongyang was responsible for having allowed its brand name to become, over time, a generic trademark and that the term "choco pie" was to be considered a common noun due to its generic descriptive sense in reference to confections of similar composition.

== Export ==
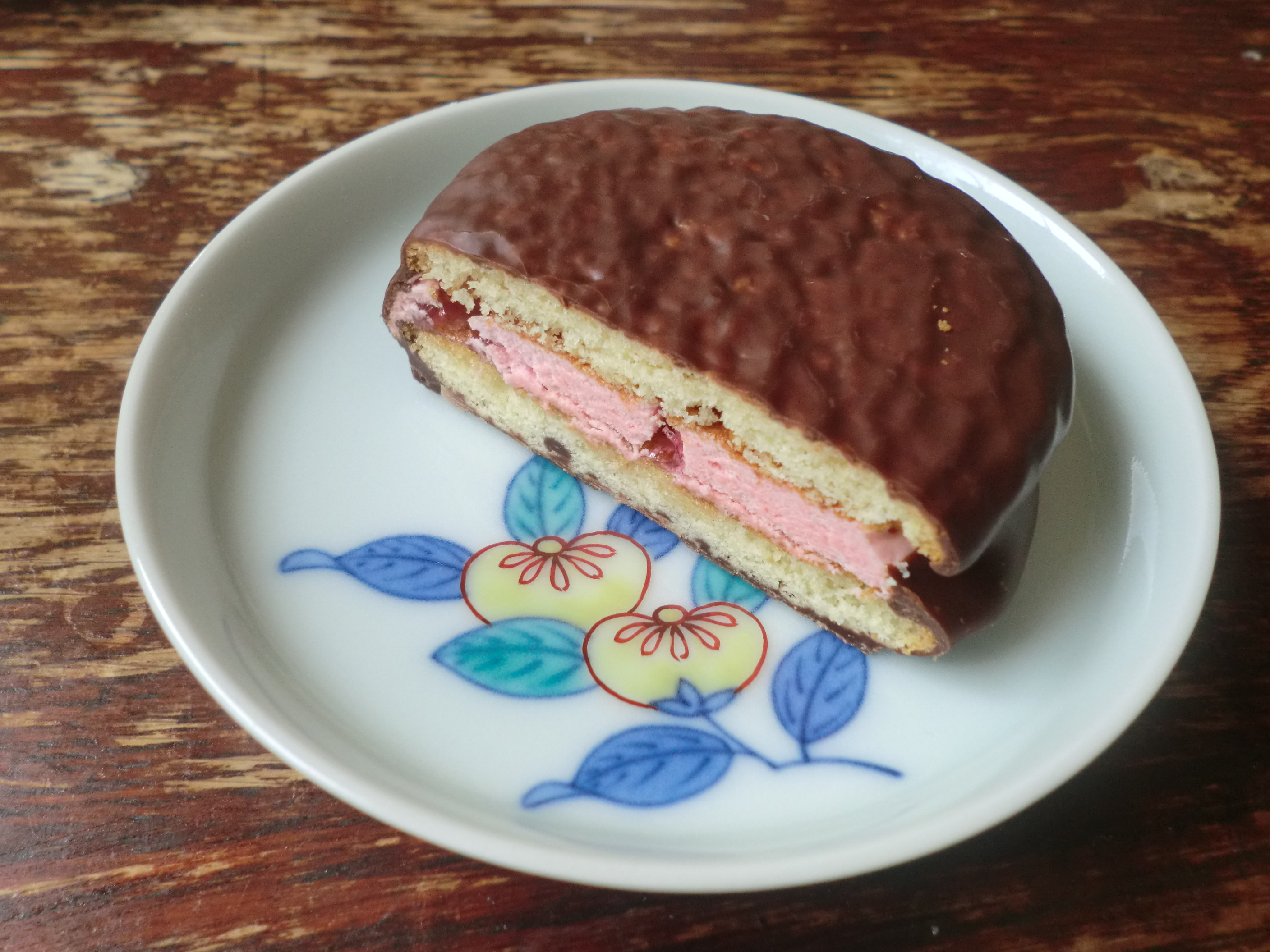
Strawberry Choco Pie was sold as a limited edition Choco Pie.

Choco Pie entered the Russian market in the Far East region after the fall of Soviet Union in the beginning of the 1990s and quickly became popular among Russian population, kids and adults alike. Starting in the 2000s, Orion began using the Choco Pie to gain a foothold in foreign markets, and now controls a two-thirds share of the Chinese snack market, with a third of Orion's revenue coming from outside Korea in 2006. Around 12.1 billion Choco Pies have been sold all over the world.

Orion has a share in five major markets – South Korea, Russia, Vietnam, China and Canada. In 2016 Choco Pie sold 600 million packs in Russia. Vietnam also consumed 600 million packs in 2018. The snack has also been particularly successful in India, Pakistan and Taiwan.

=== North Korea ===
In the early 2010s, exports of choco pies to North Korea were reportedly very popular, with North Korean workers at the Kaeseong Industrial Complex in North Korea receiving choco pies in lieu of cash bonuses, which were seen as too capitalistic. Prior to the closing of the complex during the 2013 Korean crisis, workers received choco pies, which had become a favorite snack at Kaeseong (개성시) and also a symbol of capitalism, in addition to their wages. However, the workers at Kaeseong (개성시) would often resell their pies on the black market. In 2010, The Chosun Ilbo reported that choco pies could fetch as much as US$9.50 on the North Korean black market. Between 2008 and 2014, the Lotte corporation estimated that it sent 1.2 million boxes of Choco Pie to North Korea.

In the wake of tensions surrounding its nuclear tests, the North Korean government temporarily shut down the Kaeseong (개성시) complex in 2013. This cut the supply of choco pies and drove the price in North Korea even higher. When the complex resumed operations after a five-month halt, employers were forbidden from paying choco pie bonuses, and advised to instead give bonuses of "sausages, noodles, coffee and chocolate". North Korea also responded to the choco pie speculation by producing its own variant of the snack.

In 2014, South Korean activists used helium balloons to launch 10,000 choco pies over the border to North Korea. Artist Jin Joo Chae made the controversy a subject of her prints and sculptures the same year, printing, with chocolate, real and imagined Choco Pie slogans onto North Korean newspapers and simulating a black market for the snack in the gallery.

== See also ==
- Ding Dong
