= Puits d'amour =

French pâtisserie of puff pastry filled with cream or jelly

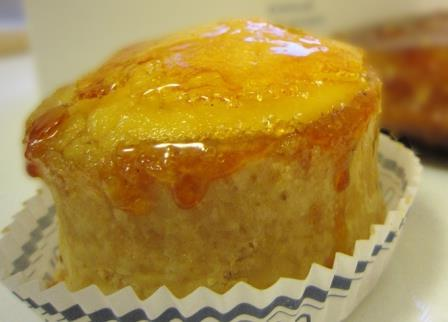
- Puits d'amour
- Type: Pâtisserie
- Place of origin: France
- Region or state: Paris
- Created by: Vincent De La Chapelle
- Main ingredients: Puff pastry, butter, confectioners' sugar, jam or jelly
- Variations: Pastry cream stuffing

The Puits d'amour (pronounced [pɥi damuʁ]) is a French pâtisserie made with puff pastry with a hollow center. The center is usually stuffed with redcurrant jelly or raspberry jam; a later variation replaced the jam with vanilla pastry cream. The surface of the cake is sprinkled with confectioners' sugar or covered with caramel.

== Etymology ==
Puits d'amour is a French expression carrying erotic connotations; it literally translates to 'well of love'.

== History ==
The first mention of the recipe appeared in Vincent De La Chapelle's 1735 recipe book Le cuisinier moderne (the modern cook). La Chapelle presented two recipes for a gâteau de puits d’amour (puits d'amour cake) consisting of a large puff pastry vol-au-vent topped with a pastry handle and stuffed with cherries or redcurrant jelly, the ensemble was meant to resemble the bucket of a well. The other recipe is for the petits puits d’amour (small puits d'amour), a bouchée sized variant of the cake. La Maison Stohrer, one of Paris' oldest patisseries, credits its founder Nicolas Stohrer, the exiled Polish king Stanislas pâtissier with creating the dessert.

In the eighteenth century, the puits d'amour caused scandal because of its name and presentation which alludes to the female genitalia; nevertheless, it was very successful in the court of Louis XV's intimate dinners.

== Preparation ==
A puits d'amour is made up of layers of staggered rings of puff pastry placed on top of a pastry circle. An egg yolk can be used to help the dough rings to stick together. The finished pastry "wells" are baked until puffed and golden-brown and set to cool. They are then sprinkled with powdered sugar, raspberry jam or redcurrant jelly which is carefully spooned in the hollow center. In a later variation, the top is glazed with caramel icing and pastry cream is used as filling.

== See also ==
- List of pastries
- List of stuffed dishes
- Éclair (pastry)
