= Morinaga =

Morinaga (written: 森永) is a Japanese surname. Notable people with the surname include:

- Ai Morinaga, Japanese manga artist
- Chitose Morinaga (森永 千才), Japanese voice actress
- Masaki Morinaga, Japanese long jumper
- Mayumi Morinaga (森永真由美, born 1981), Japanese singer
- Milk Morinaga, Japanese manga artist
- Sōkō Morinaga, Rinzai Zen roshi
- Taku Morinaga (森永 卓, born 1995), Japanese footballer
- Takuro Morinaga (森永卓郎, 1957–2025), Japanese economist and academic

== See also ==
- Prince Morinaga, murdered by Ashikaga Tadayoshi during the Kemmu Restoration
- Morinaga & Company, a Japanese confectionery company
- Morinaga Milk Industry, a Japanese milk products company
