= Torta setteveli =

Italian multi-layer chocolate and hazelnut cake

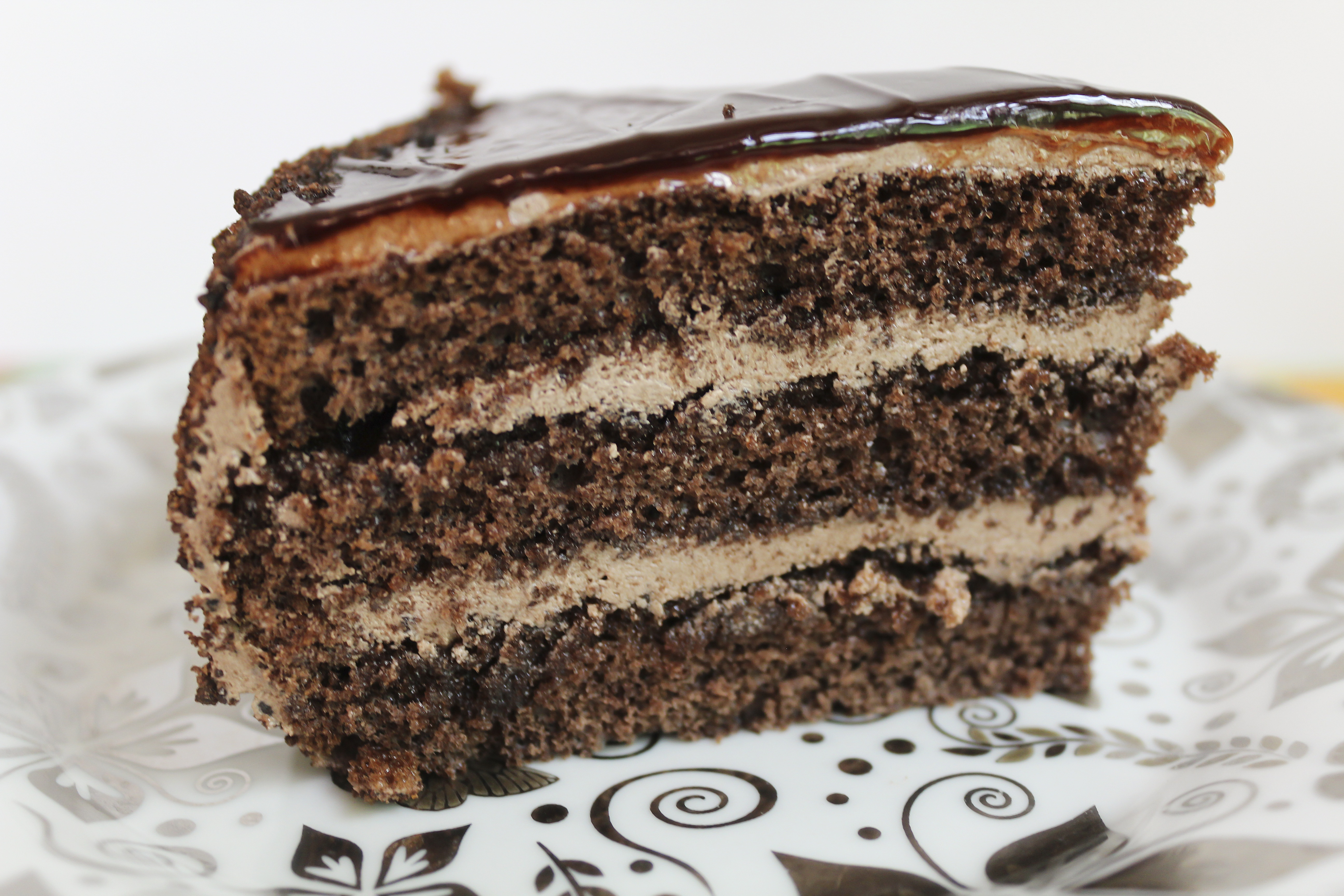
- Type: Cake
- Place of origin: Italy
- Main ingredients: Chocolate, hazelnut

Torta setteveli (lit. 'seven-veil cake') is a seven-layer cake. Traditionally served at birthdays, it includes chocolate and hazelnuts. It is traditionally served at birthday parties in Palermo, Sicily.

This cake is composed of a base of sponge cake (without flour) of Apulian almonds, Piedmont hazelnut mousse, Madagascar chocolate and a crunchy gianduja base with cereals.

Torta setteveli was conceived by master pastry chefs Luigi Biasetto (Padua), Cristian Beduschi (Belluno) and Gianluca Mannori (Prato), comprising the Italian team whose cake won the international Coupe du Monde de la Pâtisserie award in Lyon in 1997.

The dessert is made up of a base of soft Savoyard chocolate and gianduja with cereals, a dark chocolate mousse "of origin", Bavarian praline hazelnut, and chocolate sheets.

Some replicas have been formulated in other regional contexts, including Sicily, where it has had a wide circulation, although the original recipe is a company secret. In these contexts the name also differs, as the Setteveli brand has been duly registered by the creators of the recipe.

== See also ==
- List of Italian desserts and pastries
- List of cakes
