= List of pies, tarts and flans =

This is a list of pies, tarts, and flans. A pie is a baked dish which is usually made of a pastry dough. Pies can be made from two pieces of pastry dough, known as a base and a top; or just a top, or just a base, and can contain fillings of various sweet or savory ingredients.

A tart is a baked dish consisting of a filling over a pastry base with an open top not covered with pastry. The pastry is usually shortcrust pastry; the filling may be sweet or savory, though modern tarts are usually fruit-based, sometimes with custard.

Flan, in Britain, is an open pastry or sponge case containing a sweet or savory filling. A typical flan of this sort is round, with shortcrust pastry.

The croustade, crostata, galette, and tarte tatin are various types of pies and tarts.

== Pies, tarts, flans ==
| Name | Image | Origin | Type | Description |
|---|---|---|---|---|
| Aloo pie | | Trinidad and Tobago | Savoury | A soft and fried pastry variant of the samosa, made from flour and water, and filled with boiled, spiced and mashed potatoes (aloo) and other vegetables like green peas. Its shape is similar to a pasty, and it is usually larger than a samosa, approximately 5 inches (13 cm) long. |
| Apple pie | | United Kingdom (England) | Sweet | A fruit pie (or tart) in which the principal filling ingredient is crisp and acidic cooking apples such as the Bramley or Granny Smith. |
| Australian and New Zealand meat pie | | Australia and New Zealand | Savory | A hand-sized meat pie containing largely minced meat and gravy sometimes with onion and often consumed as a takeaway food snack. The pie itself is congruent with the United Kingdom's steak pie. |
| Bacon and egg pie | | United Kingdom | Savory | A pie containing bacon, egg and often onion |
| Bakewell tart | | United Kingdom (England) | Sweet | A tart with a shortcrust pastry shell, spread with jam and filled with a sponge-like, ground almond filling. It is often covered with nuts, such as almonds and peanuts, a top layer of almond flavored icing, and a half glacé cherry. |
| Banana cream pie | | United States | Sweet | A cream pie made with a rich custard made from milk, cream, flour, and eggs and combined with sliced bananas in a pastry or graham crumb crust. It is often made with a whipped cream topping. |
| Banoffee pie | | United Kingdom (East Sussex) | Sweet | An English pastry-based dessert made from bananas, toffee and cream, either on a pastry base or digestive biscuit crumb crust. Invented in 1971 by Nigel Mackenzie and Ian Dowding of the Hungry Monk restaurant, Jevington, East Sussex. |
| Bay tat | | Indonesia (Bengkulu) | Sweet | A sweet pie or tart made from coconut milk with pineapple jam or coconut jam as filling. |
| Bavarian cream pie | | Bavaria | Sweet | A sweet chocolatey pie best served cold, topped with Bavarian cream. |
| Bean pie | | United States | Sweet | A sweet custard pie with a filling of mashed navy beans, sugar, butter, milk, and spices, including vanilla, cinnamon, and nutmeg. |
| Bedfordshire clanger | | United Kingdom (England) | Savory and sweet | An elongated, suet crust pie with a savory filling at one end (meat, potatoes and vegetables) and a sweet filling (jam or fruit) at the other. |
| Bisteeya pastilla, etc. | | Morocco | Savory | A traditional Berber meat pie traditionally made of squab (fledgling pigeons) in crisp layers of warka dough, with a crunchy layer of toasted and ground almonds, cinnamon, and sugar. Many variant transliterations: bastilla, bsteeya, b'stilla, bstilla, ... |
| Blackberry pie | | United Kingdom | Sweet | A fruit pie with a filling made from blackberries. |
| Black bottom pie | | United States | Sweet | A layer of chocolate pastry cream or pudding, the "black bottom", topped with whipped cream or meringue in a crust of variable composition. |
| Black bun | | United Kingdom (Scotland) | Sweet | A pastry-covered fruitcake, traditionally eaten on Twelfth Night. |
| Blueberry pie | | United States (New England) | Sweet | A fruit pie (or tart) in which the principal filling ingredient is blueberries. |
| Bob Andy pie | | United States (Amish community) | Sweet | A sweet custard pie, spiced with cinnamon and cloves. |
| Bougatsa | | Greece | Sweet or savory | Consists of custard, cheese, or minced meat filling between layers of phyllo. |
| Boysenberry pie | | United States | Sweet | A fruit pie made with boysenberries, often simmered into a softer sweeter "preserve"-type gel, most frequently with a second covering crust, either lattice or with only a few cutouts. |
| Bridie | | United Kingdom (Scotland) | Savory | A small, savory pie filled with minced steak, butter, and beef suet seasoned with salt and pepper. Sometimes with an addition of minced onions. |
| Buko pie | | Philippines | Sweet | A sweet pie originating from the Philippines. It was only available to the island country, until a method of freezing was used. It is a very popular pie, consisting of young coconuts. |
| Bumbleberry pie | | Canada, United States | Sweet | A sweet fruit pie with a filling of blackberries, blueberries, raspberries and strawberries. Other varieties also include other berries or the addition of grapes. The color of the filling is a deep purple, and it is baked in a typical pie shell pâte sucrée. |
| Bundevara | | Serbia | Sweet | An elongated, strudel-like pie filled with sweetened pumpkin. |
| Bündner Nusstorte | | Switzerland (Graubünden) | Sweet | A traditional sweet, caramelised nut-filled pastry (generally walnut). |
| Burek | | Turkey (Anatolia) | Savory | Phyllo filled with cheese, meat, potatoes and other vegetables. Found in the cuisines of the Balkans, the Caucasus, Central Asia, West Asia, and parts of North Africa. |
| Butter pie | | United Kingdom (England) | Savory | Made with sliced potatoes, onion, butter, salt and pepper in a light pastry casing. |
| Butter tart | | Canada | Sweet | Butter, sugar and eggs in a pastry shell, with raisins, pecans or walnuts often added. |
| Buttermilk pie | | United States | Sweet | A traditional custard-like pie in a pastry crust with a filling made of a mixture of sugar, butter, eggs, buttermilk and flour. |
| Cantaloupe pie | | United States | Sweet | A custard pie of cantaloupe, butter, eggs, and nutmeg, with meringue topping. |
| Caramel tart | | Australia | Sweet | A sweet tart, filled with soft piped caramel. Sometimes topped with whipped cream or drizzled with chocolate. |
| Cashew pie | | Worldwide | Sweet | Prepared using cashews as a main ingredient. |
| Cheesecake | | Ancient Greece | Sweet | Cream cheese and pastry; may come in a variety of flavors. |
| Cherry pie | | United Kingdom | Sweet | A fruit pie baked with a cherry filling. Usually made with tart rather than sweet cherries so as to control the sweetness of the pie. |
| Chess pie | | United Kingdom | Sweet | A custard pie with a filling composed of eggs, butter, granulated sugar, brown sugar, vanilla and corn meal. |
| Chestnut pie | | Italy | Savory or sweet | A pie prepared using chestnuts as a primary ingredient |
| Chewette | | United Kingdom | Savory | A dish eaten in the England during the Middle Ages and early modern period, described variably as a pie, tart, or pastry. Contents varied, including at times meat, ginger, fish, boiled eggs and spices. |
| Chicken and mushroom pie | | United Kingdom | Savory | A pie made with a pastry crust with a filling of small pieces of chicken and sliced mushrooms in a creamy sauce. |
| Chiffon pie | | United States | Sweet | A pie with a filling made by folding meringue or whipped cream into a mixture resembling a fruit curd (most commonly lemon) in a crust of variable composition. Can also be made with canned pumpkin in place of the fruit. |
| Chinese pie Pâté chinois | | Canada (Quebec) | Savory | A layered French Canadian dish similar to the British cottage pie. It is made with ground beef and sautéed onions on the bottom layer, canned corn (whole-kernel or creamed) for the middle layer, and mashed potatoes on top. |
| Cobbler | | United Kingdom, United States | Sweet | A dish consisting of a fruit or savory filling poured into a large baking dish and covered with a batter, biscuit, or dumpling before being baked. |
| Coconut cream pie | | United States | Sweet | A cream pie made with a rich custard made from milk, cream, flour, eggs, and shredded coconut in a pastry or graham crumb crust, usually topped with whipped cream and toasted coconut. |
| Cookie cake pie | | United States | Sweet | A combination of cookie dough and cake batter baked together in a pie crust. |
| Corned beef pie | | United Kingdom | Savory | A pie with a filling of corned beef, onion and other vegetables such as corn, peas or carrot. The pie can be made with a mashed potato topping, as in cottage pie, or with a traditional pastry crust. |
| Cottage pie | | United Kingdom | Savoury | A baked pie with a mince beef filling usually containing vegetables such as peas, carrots and onions and topped with a layer of mashed potato. |
| Coulibiac | | Russia | Savory | A baked pie with a filling made with salmon or sturgeon, rice, hard-boiled eggs, mushrooms, and dill. |
| Cumberland pie | | United Kingdom (Cumbria) | Savory | A meat pie topped with a crust of bread crumbs. |
| Curry pie | | United Kingdom | Savory | A pie with a pastry crust filled with Indian or Chinese curry. |
| Curry puff | | Malaysia, Singapore, Thailand | Savory | A small pie consisting of curry with chicken and potatoes in a deep-fried or baked pastry shell, similar to an empanada. |
| Custard tart flans pâtissier | | United Kingdom, France | Sweet | A baked pastry consisting of a pastry crust filled with egg custard. French custard tarts are generally shallower and larger than British ones, and therefore served in slices rather than as individual items. |
| Derby pie | | United States (Kentucky) | Sweet | A chocolate and walnut pie with a pastry dough crust; commonly made with pecans, chocolate chips and Kentucky bourbon. |
| Desperation pie | | United States | Sweet | A type of pie, that uses butter, sugar, eggs and flour with other ingredients cook had on hand, that could be used as a substitute for ingredients that were out of season or too expense. Pictured: buttermilk pie. |
| Dried apple pie | | | Sweet | A type of apple pie, using reconstituted dehydrated apple slices. |
| Eel pie | | Europe | Savory | Prepared since at least the Middle Ages in Europe |
| Egg pie | | Philippines | Sweet | A sweet Filipino pie with an egg custard filling and a characteristic toasty brown top made from egg whites. |
| Egg tart | | China (Guangdong) | Sweet | A baked pastry consisting of egg custard in a cookie crust or puff crust. |
| Empanada | | Spain | Sweet or savory | A stuffed pastry, baked or fried and stuffed with a variety of fillings, including meat, cheese, vegetables or fruit. Popular throughout Spain, Portugal, Latin America, Central America, the Philippines, Indonesia, Malaysia, and the Caribbean. |
| Fidget pie | | United Kingdom | Sweet and savory | An English pie containing layers of apple, cured pork (typically bacon), onion, and sometimes potato under a crimped, shortcrust pastry top. |
| Fish pie Fisherman's Pie | | United Kingdom | Savory | A dish made with white fish in a béchamel sauce with a mashed potato topping, similar to cottage pie. |
| Flan | | Worldwide | Sweet or savory | An open pastry or sponge cake containing a sweet or savory filling. |
| Flan chino | | Spain | Sweet | A rectangular-shaped egg dessert similar to a cross between a flan and a tocinillo de cielo. |
| Flapper pie | | Canada (Western Canada) | Sweet | A custard pie with a graham wafer crust, topped with meringue. |
| Fleischkuekle | | Russia (Volga Germans) | Savory | A fried meat pie made with flat bread. A traditional Volga German dish, through immigration became an addition to the cuisine of North Dakota. |
| Flipper pie | | Canada | Savory | A meat pie made from young harp seal flippers. |
| Fried pie | | United States | Sweet | A small, fried pastry crust pie containing a fruit filling. |
| Fruit pie | | | Sweet | Pies with a cooked or uncooked fruit filling, including as apple pie or blueberry pie. |
| Gibanica | | The Balkans | Savory | A traditional Balkan pastry, usually made with white cheese (feta, sirene). |
| Grape hull pie | | United States | Sweet | A pie traditionally made with muscadine grapes and their skins. |
| Green grape pie | | United States | Sweet | A fruit pie traditionally made with wild green grapes before seeds have formed in the spring, such as early May. |
| Guapple pie | | Philippines (Silay) | Sweet | A fruit pie traditionally made from Silay City, Philippines, made with guapple also known as apple guava, a large guava variety, as a local adaptation of the classic apple pie. |
| Gypsy tart | | United Kingdom (Kent) | Sweet | A traditional British tart made with evaporated milk and muscovado sugar. |
| Hjónabandssæla | | Iceland | Sweet | A traditional Icelandic pie made with a rhubarb jam filling in an oatmeal crust. |
| Homity pie | | United Kingdom | Savory | A traditional British, open vegetable pie. The pastry crust contains a filling of potatoes and an onion and leek mixture, which is then covered with cheese. |
| Hornazo | | Spain | Savory | A Spanish meat pie made with flour and yeast and stuffed with pork loin, spicy chorizo sausage and hard-boiled eggs. |
| Huckleberry pie | | United States | Sweet | |
| Indian potato pie | | India | Savory | A spiced potato and sweet potato pie baked in a crust created from multiple layers of Filo pastry. |
| Jamaican patty | | Jamaica | Savory | A small, baked pastry coloured yellow with turmeric, usually filled with seasoned ground beef and with Scotch Bonnet pepper added for spice. |
| Kalakukko | | Finland (Savonia) | Savory | A loaf of bread filled with fish. |
| Karelian pasties | | Finland, Russia (Karelia) | Savory | Pasties made from a thin rye crust usually with a filling of rice, but originally the filling used to be mashed potatoes or barley. |
| Key lime pie | | United States (Florida) | Sweet | A fruit pie made with key lime juice, egg yolks, and sweetened condensed milk in a crust. |
| Khachapuri | | Georgia | Savory | A cheese-filled bread dish. |
| Killie pie | | United Kingdom (Kilmarnock, Scotland) | Savory | A steak pie served at Kilmarnock F.C. football ground. |
| Knish | | Eastern Europe (Ashkenazi Jews) | Savory | Baked or fried dumpling made of flaky dough with filling of mashed potatoes, ground meat, sauerkraut, onions, kasha or cheese. |
| Kuchen | | Germany | Sweet | The generic term referring to "cake" in German. |
| Kurnik | | Russia | Savory | A dome-shaped savory Russian pirog, usually filled with chicken or turkey, eggs, onions, kasha or rice, and other optional components. |
| Lamprey pie | | England | Savory | A pastry dish made from sea lampreys or European river lampreys |
| Lanttusupikas | | Finland | Savory | A double folded buttered flaky crust pie, filled with thin, braised swede slices and pork loin. |
| Leche flan | | Philippines | Sweet | A soft and creamy flan made out of egg yolks, sugar and milk. |
| Lemon ice box pie | | United States | Sweet | Lemon juice, eggs, and condensed milk in a pie crust, with preparation very similar to that of key lime pie. |
| Lemon meringue pie | | United States, France, and England | Sweet | A shortcrust or shortbread pastry with lemon curd filling and a fluffy meringue topping. |
| Manchester tart | | United Kingdom (England) | Sweet | A baked tart consisting of a shortcrust pastry shell, spread with raspberry jam, covered with a custard filling and topped with flakes of coconut and a Maraschino cherry. |
| Meat and potato pie | | United Kingdom | Savory | Potato, either lamb or beef, and sometimes carrot or onion baked in a pastry shell. |
| Meat pie | | Worldwide | Savory | A preparation common especially to the UK and Commonwealth countries. Made with meat, seasonings and gravy |
| Melktert | | South Africa | Sweet | A South African dessert consisting of a sweet pastry crust containing a creamy filling made from milk, flour, sugar and eggs. |
| Melton Mowbray pork pie | | United Kingdom (England) | Savory | A hand-formed crust pork pie made with uncured chopped rather than minced, meat. |
| Milk pie | | Indonesia (Bali) | Sweet | An Indonesian custard tart pastry consisting of a shortcrust pastry filled with egg custard and condensed milk. |
| Millionaire pie | | United States (Southern) | Sweet | A no-bake pie with whipped topping, pineapple, coconut, and pecans. |
| Mince pie | | United Kingdom | Sweet | A small British sweet pie traditionally served during the Christmas season; a sweet pastry case filled with currants, suet and spices. Centuries ago they contained meat, suet, and spices. |
| Mississippi mud pie | | United States (Southern) | Sweet | Dessert pie consisting of a gooey chocolate filling on top of a crumbly chocolate crust; usually served with ice cream. |
| Moravian chicken pie | | United States (North Carolina) | Savory | A traditional double crusted pie made with a flaky pastry filled with only chunks of chicken and a thick chicken broth-based sauce. Unlike chicken "pot pies", no vegetables are included in the filling. Served with hot chicken gravy on the side. |
| Mustard tart | | France | Savory | A pie made of puff pastry, Dijon mustard, Emmentaler or Gruyère cheese, sliced tomatoes and sprinkled with spices (herbes de Provence, salt and pepper). |
| Natchitoches meat pie | | United States (Louisiana) | Savory | Crescent-shaped, flaky wheat pastry turnover with a savory meat filling. |
| Neenish tart | | Australia, New Zealand | Sweet | A tart made with a pastry base and with icing of two colours on top. The filling consists of sweet gelatine-set cream, mock cream, icing sugar paste, or a lemon-flavoured filling—most familiar to New Zealand residents—made from butter, icing sugar, sweetened condensed milk and lemon juice. The Australian version of the Pineapple tart is similar but is filled with pineapple jam and topped with passionfruit icing. |
| Öçpoçmaq; Echpochmak | | Russia (Volga region) | Savory | A triangular pastry, filled with minced beef, onion and potatoes. Considered a Tartar national dish. |
| Parrot pie | | Australia | Savory | Settlers in Australia baked a pie containing parrot meat, by itself or with other meats. |
| Pască | | Romania, Moldova | Sweet | A traditional Easter pie filled with fresh cheese like urdă or cottage cheese. Other variants include sour cream, chocolate, or berries fillings. |
| Pastafrola | | Río de la Plata (Argentina, Uruguay, Paraguay) | Sweet | A jam-filled tart with shortcrust pastry lattice. Fillings may include quince cheese, dulce de batata (sweet potato jam), dulce de leche, guava, or strawberry jam. |
| Pastel de nata | | Portugal | Sweet | A custard tart made with egg yolk. Also known as pastél de Belém due to their geographic origin. |
| Pasty | | United Kingdom (England) | Savory | A traditional lunch food for Cornish miners. The claim that the rolled part of the crust was used as a handle and left uneaten where it was soiled with arsenic-laden ore from the miner's hand is a myth. They are also popular in Canada and the Upper Peninsula of Michigan, United States due to Cornish migration. |
| Peach pie | | United States | Sweet | Prepared with peaches as the primary ingredient, with added spices such as nutmeg, ginger or cinnamon. May be strictly a fruit pie, or a custard based pie. Because peaches are a high moisture fruit and produce copious amounts of juice as they cook, peach pies often have a lattice top to allow steam to vent and prevent excessive liquid build-up during baking, which could result in a runny pie. |
| Peanut pie | | United States (Southern) | Sweet | Prepared with peanuts or peanut butter as a primary ingredient. |
| Pear tart | | France | Sweet | Typically Parisian, called tarte bourdaloue. |
| Pecan pie | | United States | Sweet | Made primarily of corn syrup or molasses and pecan nuts in a pie shell. |
| Pie à la mode | | United States (Minnesota) | Sweet | A pie with ice cream on top. |
| Pirog | | Russia, Ukraine | Savory or sweet | The generic term for pies and pasties in Eastern-Slavic cuisines. The filling for pirog may be sweet and contain quark or cottage cheese, fruits like apples, plums or various berries, as well as honey, nuts or poppy seeds. Savory versions may consist of meat, fish, mushrooms, cabbage, rice, buckwheat groats or potato. |
| Pirozhki pirozhok, piroshki | | Russia, Ukraine | Savory or sweet | The generic word for individual-sized baked or fried buns (small pirogs) stuffed with a variety of fillings. |
| Plăcintă | | Romania, Moldova | Sweet or savoury | A traditional Romanian pastry usually filled with apples, cheese, pumpkin or others. |
| Pork pie | | United Kingdom | Savory | A traditional British meat pie consisting of roughly chopped pork and pork jelly sealed in a hot water crust pastry. |
| Pot pie | | United Kingdom (England) | Savory | A savory pie made from pastry crust, usually served in individual containers. Normally made of a creamy sauce, turkey or chicken meat, carrots, peas, and pearl onions. This dish is sometimes served with rice. |
| Pumpkin pie | | United Kingdom (England) | Sweet | A pumpkin-based custard flavored with nutmeg, cinnamon, cloves, and ginger, baked in a single pie shell. Originally developed in Tudor England, now mainly associated with the Northern United States and Canada. Sometimes the crust is a graham cracker crust or a pastry dough crust. Very common in the autumn and early winter holidays, especially Thanksgiving. |
| Quiche | | France | Savory | The generic term; pastry base and sides, with various chopped fillings set in an egg/milk mix. |
| Qumështor me Petë | | Albania | Sweet | A pie filled with apricots, plums, and honey. |
| Raisin pie | | Worldwide | Sweet | A pie in which the main ingredient is raisins. |
| Rappie pie | | Canada (Nova Scotia, Prince Edward Island) | Savory | An Acadian dish, also known as râpure, consisting of grated potatoes, meat, onions, and soup stock. |
| Raspberry pie | | Worldwide | Sweet | A fruit pie filled with raspberries, sometimes topped with whipped cream. |
| Rhubarb pie | | United Kingdom | Sweet | A fruit pie filled with diced rhubarb. |
| Rook pie | | United Kingdom | Savory | A pie containing rook meat, now uncommon. |
| Samosa singara, sambusac, samsa | | Indian subcontinent, Central and Western Asia, North, South and Horn of Africa | Savory | A fried or baked pastry with a savory filling such as spiced potatoes, onions, peas, lentils, ground lamb or chicken, often accompanied by chutney. |
| Saskatoon berry pie | | Canada | Sweet | A fruit pie filled with saskatoon berries. |
| Sausage roll | | United Kingdom | Savory | A long cylindrical roll of sausagemeat encased in flaky or puff pastry. |
| Scotch pie | | United Kingdom | Savory | A small, double-crust meat pie filled with minced mutton or other meat. |
| Sea-pie; Cipaille | | United Kingdom | Savory | A layered meat pie made with meat or fish, and is known to have been served to British sailors during the 18th century. |
| Sfiha | | Lebanon | Savory | An open-faced meat pie made with ground mutton. |
| Shaker lemon pie | | United States | Sweet | Thinly sliced lemons, sugar, and eggs in a crust, first made by the Shakers. |
| Shepherd's pie | | United Kingdom (England) | Savory | A roasted mutton or lamb cooked in pie dish lined with mashed potatoes, with a mashed potato crust on top. |
| Shoofly pie | | United States (Pennsylvania Dutch Country) | Sweet | A molasses pie common to Pennsylvania and the Delaware Valley. |
| Soparnik | | Croatia | Savory | A pie with a filling of chard, chives (or young onion leaves), parsley, olive oil and garlic. |
| Southern tomato pie | | United States | Savory | A savory dish consisting of a pie shell with a filling of tomatoes (sometimes with basil or other herbs), covered with a topping of grated cheese mixed with either mayonnaise or a white sauce. |
| Spanakopita spinach pie | | Greece | Savory | A pie with a filling of chopped spinach, feta cheese, onions and eggs. |
| Speķrauši pīrāgi or pīrādziņi | | Latvia | Savory | An oblong or crescent-shaped baked bread roll or pastry filled with finely chopped fatty bacon cubes and onions. |
| Stargazy pie | | United Kingdom (Cornwall) | Savory | A Cornish dish made of baked pilchards, along with eggs and potatoes, covered with a pastry crust; the fish heads (and sometimes tails) are baked protruding through the crust, thus appearing to be gazing skyward. |
| Steak and kidney pie | | United Kingdom | Savory | A pie filled with a mixture of diced beef, diced kidney (often of ox, lamb, or pork), fried onion, and brown gravy. |
| Steak pie | | United Kingdom | Savory | A meat pie made from stewing steak and beef gravy, enclosed in a pastry shell. |
| Strawberry pie | | United Kingdom | Sweet | A fruit pie filled with strawberries, sometimes topped with whipped cream. |
| Strawberry rhubarb pie | | United StatesUnited Kingdom | Sweet | A fruit pie filled with strawberries and rhubarb, usually with a lattice-style crust on top. |
| Sugar cream pie | | United States | Sweet | A single-crust pie with a filling made from flour, butter, salt, vanilla, and cream, with brown sugar or maple syrup. |
| Sugar pie | | Northern France and Belgium | Sweet | Either a leavened dough topped with sugar, or a pie crust filled with a sugar mixture (similar to a treacle tart). Also popular in French Canada. |
| Sweet potato pie | | United States (Southern) | Sweet | A large tart in an open pie shell without a top crust, with a filling consisting of mashed sweet potatoes, milk, sugar and eggs, flavored with spices such as nutmeg. |
| Tamale pie | | United States, Mexico | Savory | A meat pie with a cornmeal crust and typical Mexican tamale fillings arranged in several layers. The meat is traditionally ground beef. |
| Tarta capuchina | | Spain | Sweet | A pie or cake made mainly with egg yolk and syrup. The pie or "cake" is usually presented in a cylindrical or rectangle shape, depending on the mold. |
| Tarta de Santiago | | Spain | Sweet | A cake or pie with a filling of ground almonds, eggs and sugar. The top of the pie is usually decorated with powdered sugar, masked by an imprint of the Cross of Saint James (cruz de Santiago) which gives the pastry its name. |
| Tarte conversation | | France | Sweet | A tart made with puff pastry that is filled with a frangipane cream and topped with royal icing. |
| Tiropita; Greek cheese pie | | Greece | Savory | A pie made with layers of buttered filo (alternatively, thick pastry or puff-pastry) and filled with a cheese-egg mixture. |
| Tocinillo de cielo | | Spain | Sweet | A dessert made from yolk egg and caramelized sugar that is compact and bright yellow. The tradition places its origin in Jerez de la Frontera more than 500 years ago. |
| Tourte de blettes | | France | Sweet | A niçoise pie made with chopped Swiss chards, pine nuts, sometimes raisins, and dusted with icing sugar. |
| Tourtière | | Canada (Quebec) | Savory | A meat pie originating from Quebec, usually made with finely diced pork, veal, beef, fish, or wild game. |
| Treacle tart | | United Kingdom | Sweet | A shortcrust pastry with a thick filling of golden syrup, breadcrumbs, and lemon juice. |
| Turnover | | | Sweet or Savoury | A small pie made from folded and sealed pastry |
| Vinegar pie | | United States | Sweet | A custard pie, associated with the cuisines of Appalachia and the Pennsylvania Dutch in the North East United States. |
| Vlaai | | Netherlands | Sweet | A pie or tart consisting of a pastry and a filling of either fruit, a crumbled butter and sugar mix, or a cooked rice and custard porridge. |
| Västerbotten pie | | Sweden | Savory | A pie filled with a mixture of Västerbotten cheese, cream and eggs. |
| Walnut pie | | Worldwide | Sweet | A pie prepared using walnuts as a main ingredient. |
| Watalappam | | Sri Lanka | Sweet | A coconut custard pudding made of coconut milk or condensed milk, jaggery, cashew nuts, eggs, and various spices, including cardamom, cloves, and nutmeg. |
| Wähe | | Switzerland | Savory or sweet | A flat pie or cake prepared with short pastry and a topping of either fruits, vegetables, or cheese. |
| Woolton pie | | United Kingdom | Savory | A pie filled with vegetables such as potatoes or parsnips, cauliflower, swede, carrots, and turnips, topped with potato pastry, grated cheese, and served with vegetable gravy. |
| Whoopie pie | Whoopie pie | United States | Sweet | An American baked product that may be considered either a cookie, pie or cake. It is made of two round mound-shaped pieces of chocolate cake, or sometimes pumpkin or gingerbread cake, with a sweet, creamy filling or frosting sandwiched between them. |
| Yau gok | | China | Savory or sweet | A traditional pastry in Cantonese cuisine, eaten during the Lunar New Year. The sweet version has a filling of peanuts and sesame seeds, while the savory version contains meat and vegetables. |
| Yorkshire Christmas pie | | United Kingdom | Savory | An elaborate standing pie most often prepared in the UK during the 18th and 19th centuries. It consisted of a series of birds enclosed in the manner of a Matryoshka doll, surrounded by pieces of gamebirds and hare, and covered in pastry. |
| Zelnik | | North Macedonia | Savory | A pastry composed of thin layers of filo dough filled with combinations of sirene, eggs, spinach, sorrel, browned meat, leeks, rice, and brined cabbage. |

== See also ==
- List of baked goods
- List of breads
- List of cakes
- List of cookies
- List of desserts
- List of pastries
- List of puddings
