= Aalsterse vla =

Traditional pie from Belgium

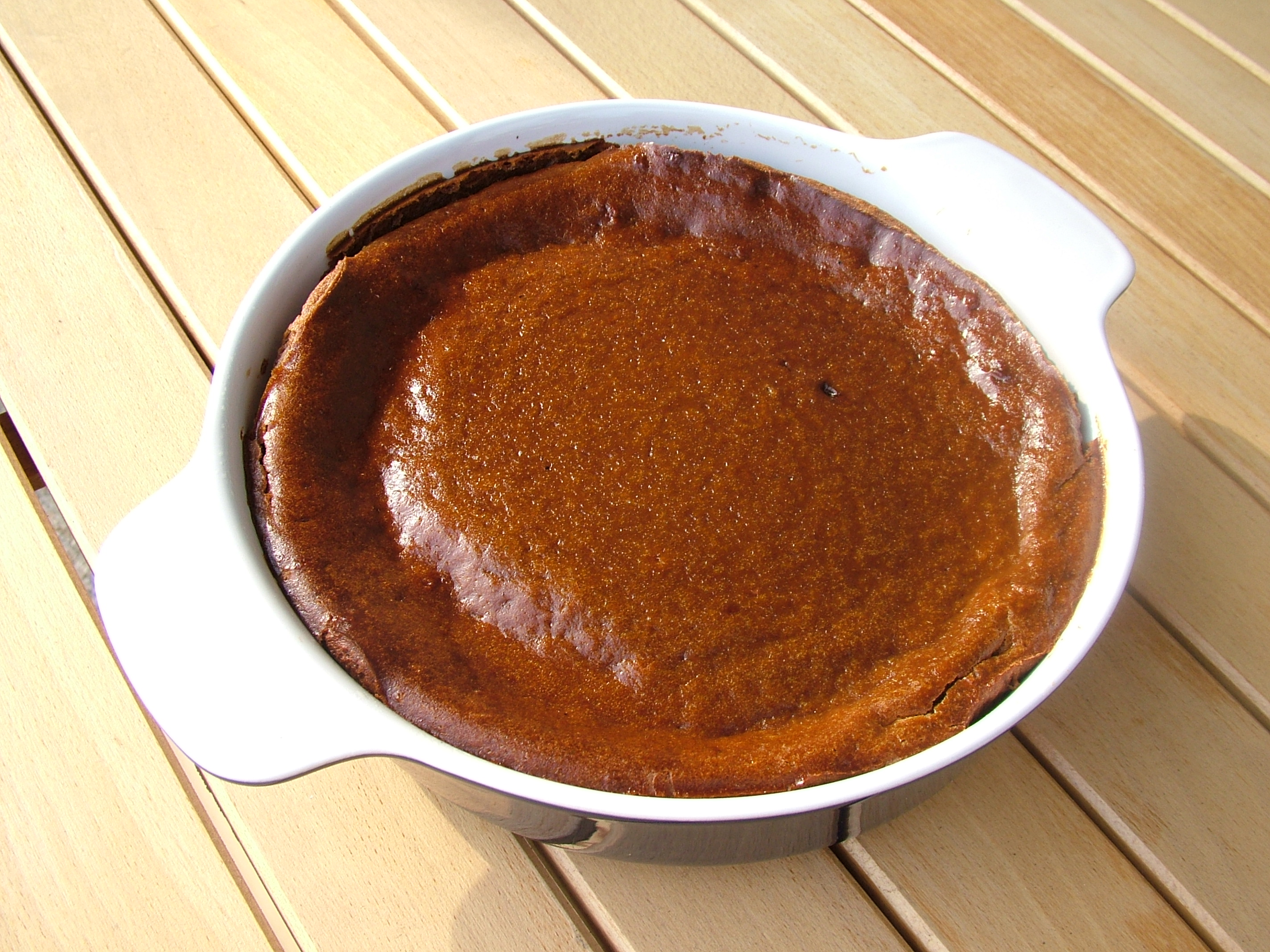
- Alternative names: Aalsterse vlaai
- Type: Pie
- Course: Dessert
- Place of origin: Belgium
- Region or state: East Flanders
- Serving temperature: Cold or room temperature
- Main ingredients: Bread (mastel), speculaas or ontbijtkoek, brown sugar, syrup, spices, eggs
- Variations: With speculaas, with raisins (modern)
- Similar dishes: Vlaai, Bread pudding

Aalsterse vla (also spelled Aalsterse vlaai) is a traditional pie from Belgium, originating from the city and surrounding region of Aalst in East Flanders, Belgium. It is recognised as part of the local culinary heritage of Flanders.

It is made from a bread pudding base containing mastel (a local bread), speculaas or ontbijtkoek, brown sugar and spices, giving it a dark colour and caramelised flavour. Unlike many Belgian pies, Aalsterse vla does not contain fruit.

== Preparation ==
The traditional version of the recipe uses mastel, a small round aniseed bread typical of Aalst. Mastel is soaked and mixed with peperkoek, brown sugar, syrup, eggs and spices such as mace or clove. The dough is then baked in a shallow round pan.

Modern recipes may include speculaas crumbs or raisins, although traditional bakers in Aalst consider these variations non-authentic. Special metal baking pans for Aalsterse vla are still sold at markets in Aalst.

== Consumption ==
Aalsterse vla is traditionally eaten during winter and around Christmas. It can be served in slices or spread on bread. It is also used as a filling for Belgian waffles.

== History ==
The exact origins of Aalsterse vla are unknown, but historical references to similar bread-based pies in Flanders date back to the 16th century. It is believed to have originated as a way to use leftover bread, especially during festive periods.

Until the early 20th century, families without home ovens would bring the prepared dough to local bakeries to be baked. In 2020, efforts began in Aalst to recognise the pie as part of Flanders’ intangible cultural heritage, supported by local baker guilds.

== See also ==
- Belgian cuisine
- Speculaas
- List of pies, tarts and flans
