= Blackberry pie =

Pie composed of blackberry filling

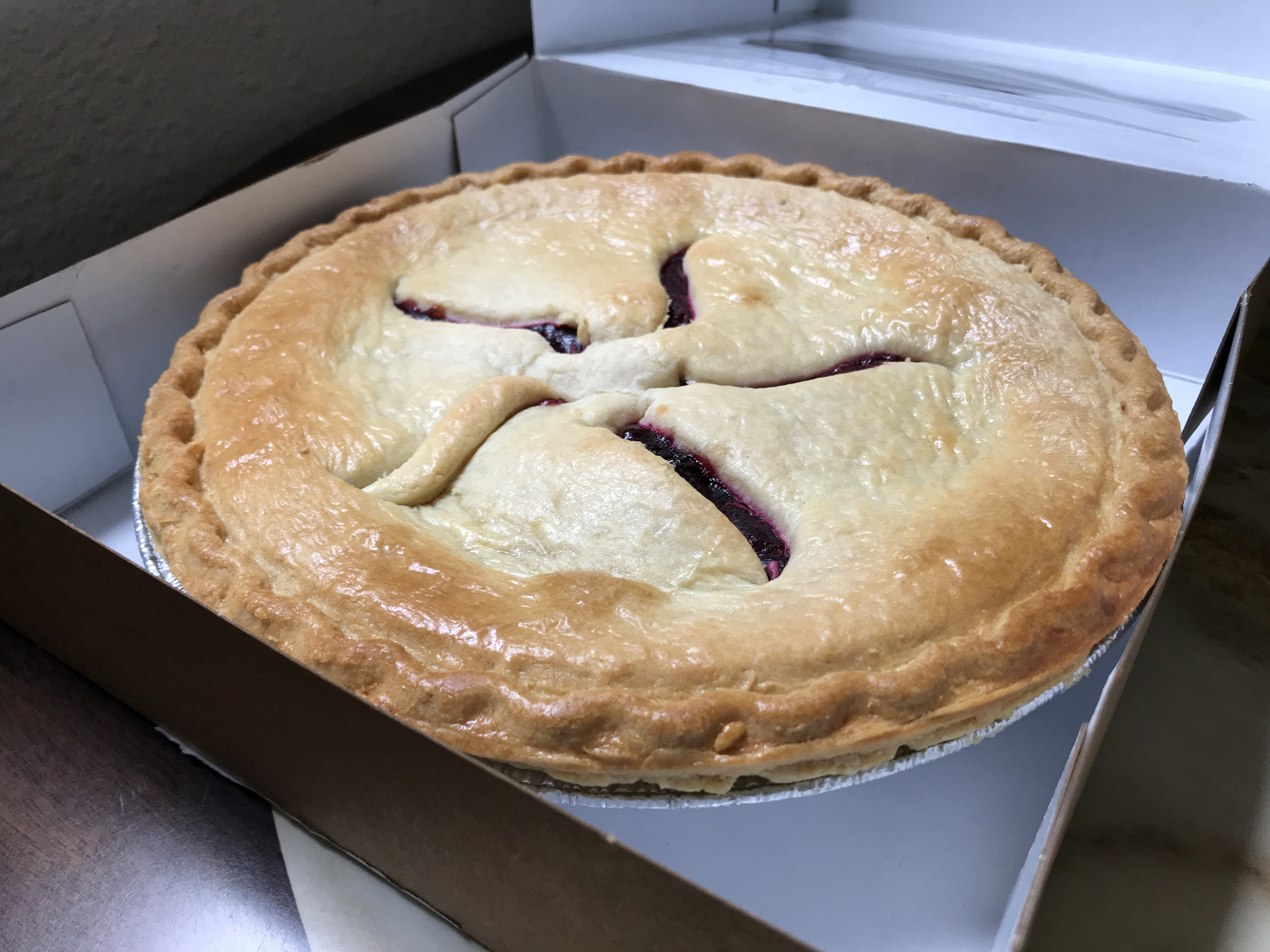
- A blackberry pie
- Type: Pie
- Place of origin: United Kingdom
- Main ingredients: Pie crust, blackberries or blackberry jam

Blackberry pie is a fruit pie composed of blackberry filling, usually in the form of either blackberry jam, actual blackberries themselves, or some combination thereof. Blackberry pie is tart, so it requires more sugar than blueberry pie. Blackberries can be stewed or soaked in water before baking to prevent burning, an issue not presented in preparing blueberry pie.

== History ==
In a newspaper, George Washington was said to eat blackberry pie, wherein the members of his household "couldn't tell, by the faces he made, whether he was thinking of something that pleased him most awfully, or had bit into a concealed and premature persimmon". In Abraham Lincoln's first inauguration lunch, one of his meals was blackberry pie. For the 200th anniversary of the Kentucky Down Under Cavern, a blackberry pie eating contest was included to commemorate a young girl who found the cave while searching for blackberries.

== Recipes ==
Some recipes use wild blackberries, while others use store-bought mixed blueberries. Sugar, vanilla extract, corn starch and lemon zest are mostly used for the filling, while eggs and butter are sometimes used. Pie dough is rolled out to make the crust.

== See also ==
- List of pies, tarts and flans
