= Black bottom pie =

A chocolate and whipped cream pie

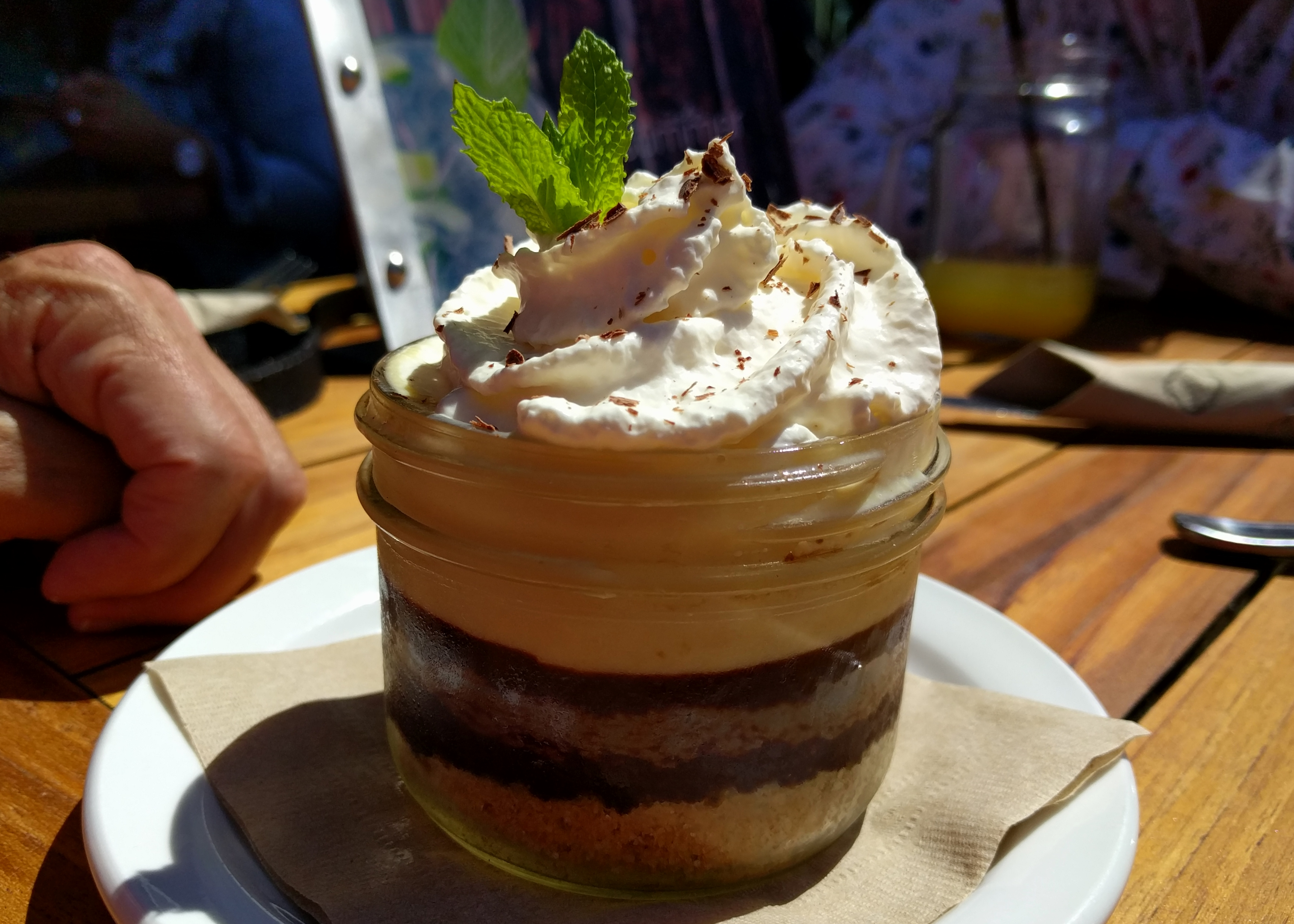
- Black bottom pie in Vancouver, Canada
- Type: Pie
- Course: Dessert
- Place of origin: United States

Black bottom pie is a type of pie originating in the United States. A single crust is pre-baked, which may be made with pie crust or a graham cracker crust. The crust is layered with chocolate pastry cream or pudding (the so called "black bottom"), which is topped with whipped cream or meringue.

Black bottom pie is sometimes identified as of Southern origin, the "black bottom" representing the dark, swampy lowlands along the Mississippi River; other sources have identified an origin in Louisiana or Oklahoma City in the early 1940s. Its invention has been claimed by Monroe Boston Strause of Los Angeles. Strause, who was known as the "Pie King", was the inventor of the chiffon pie and the graham cracker crust.

== See also ==
- List of pies, tarts and flans
