= Cashew pie =

Pie prepared with cashews

Cashew nut pie
- Type: Pie
- Place of origin: United States
- Main ingredients: Cashews
- Variations: Whipped cream, chocolate, caramel

Cashew pie is a pie prepared with cashews as a primary ingredient. Whole or chopped cashews may be used, or both. It may be prepared with a sweet filling base prepared with corn syrup, sugar and eggs, similar to how pecan pie filling is prepared. It may be prepared using chocolate and fruits, such as raspberry, as an ingredient, and may be served topped with whipped cream or caramel. It may be served hot.

== See also ==
- Chestnut pie
- List of pies, tarts and flans
- Peanut pie
- Walnut pie
