= Blueberry pie =

Baked pastry with fruit filling

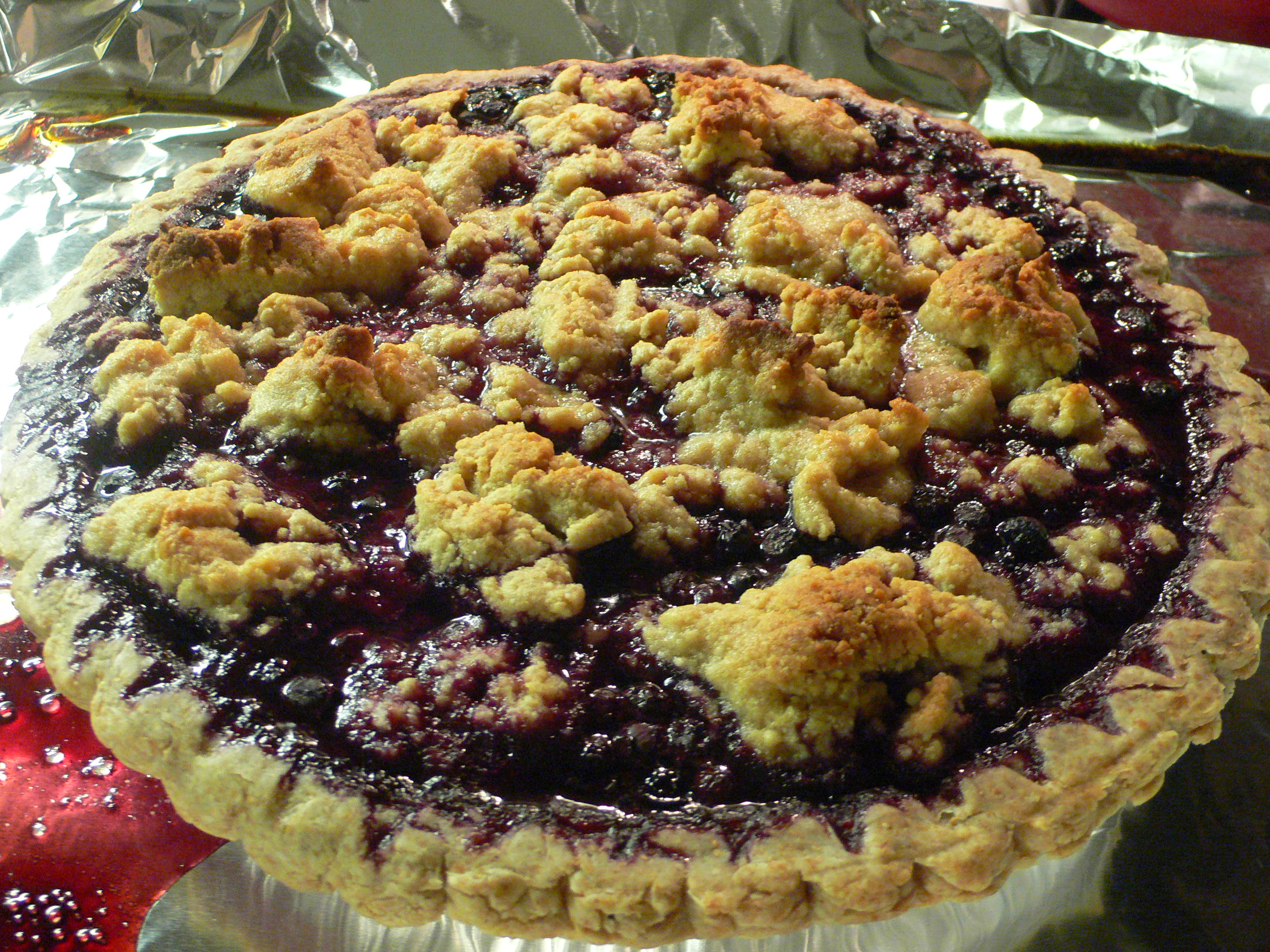
- Type: Pie
- Course: Dessert
- Place of origin: United States, Canada
- Serving temperature: Hot or cold
- Main ingredients: Blueberries, pie crust, sugar, corn starch

Blueberry pie (commercial)
Nutritional value per 100 g (3.5 oz)
- Energy: 232 kJ (55 kcal)
- Carbohydrates: 35 g
- Fat: 10 g
- Protein: 1.8 g
Vitamins and minerals
| Vitamins | Quantity %DV^{†} |
| Vitamin A equiv. | 5% 44 μg |
| Thiamine (B1) | 1% 0.01 mg |
| Riboflavin (B2) | 2% 0.03 mg |
| Niacin (B3) | 2% 0.3 mg |
| Pantothenic acid (B5) | 3% 0.14 mg |
| Vitamin B6 | 2% 0.04 mg |
| Folate (B9) | 7% 27 μg |
| Vitamin C | 3% 3 mg |
| Vitamin E | 7% 1 mg |
| Vitamin K | 9% 10.5 μg |
| Minerals | Quantity %DV^{†} |
| Calcium | 1% 8 mg |
| Iron | 2% 0.3 mg |
| Magnesium | 1% 5 mg |
| Manganese | 8% 0.18 mg |
| Phosphorus | 2% 23 mg |
| Potassium | 2% 50 mg |
| Zinc | 1% 0.16 mg |
- Other constituents: Quantity
- Water: 52.5 g
- Link to USDA Database entry
- ^{†}Percentages estimated using US recommendations for adults, except for potassium, which is estimated based on expert recommendation from the National Academies.

Blueberry pie is a fruit pie with a blueberry filling. Blueberry pie is readily made because it does not require pitting or peeling of fruit. It usually has a top and bottom crust. The top crust can be circular, but the pie can also have a crumble crust or no top crust. Blueberry pies are often eaten in the summertime when blueberries are in season in the Northern Hemisphere.

== History ==
Blueberry pie was first eaten by early American settlers. Berry pie, including with blueberries, was documented in the US region of New England as early as 1872 in the Appledore Cook Book.

Wild ('lowbush') and cultivated ('highbush') blueberries, which are native to North America, are used to make blueberry pie. In the 21st century, it is a common dessert in Canada and the United States where blueberry pie made with wild blueberries is the official state dessert of Maine.

== Ingredients ==
The typical primary ingredients for blueberry pie are rinsed and stemmed blueberries. The berries can be frozen or fresh. Other ingredients include flour or instant tapioca, cinnamon, nutmeg, sugar, vanilla and butter. Ingredients may vary, depending upon the recipe.

== Nutrients ==
In a reference amount of 100 g (3.5 oz), commercially prepared blueberry pie supplies 55 calories, and is 10% fat, 35% carbohydrates, 3% protein, and 52% water (table). It contains no micronutrients in significant percentage of the Daily Value (table).

== Gallery ==
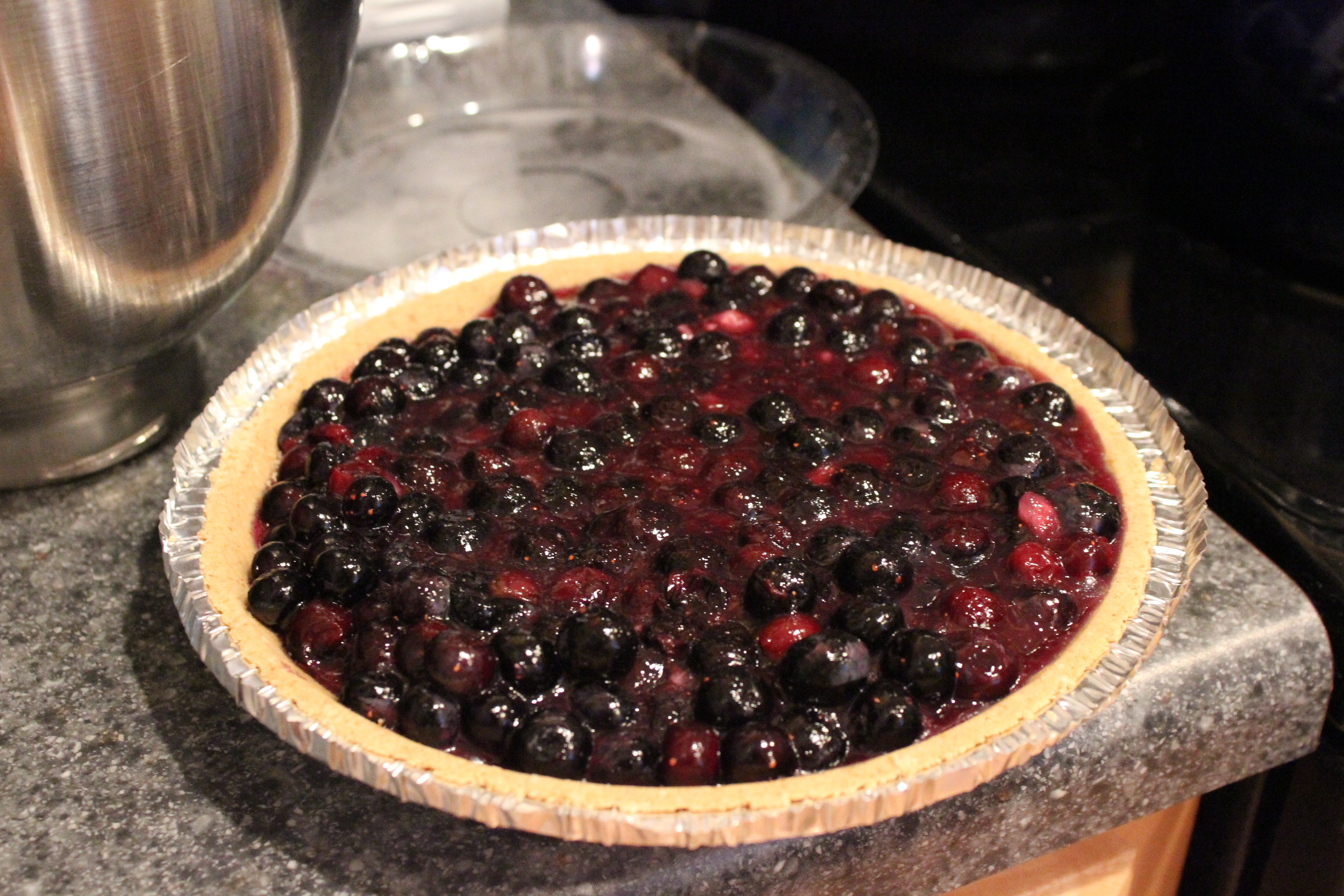
Blueberry pie in a graham cracker crust

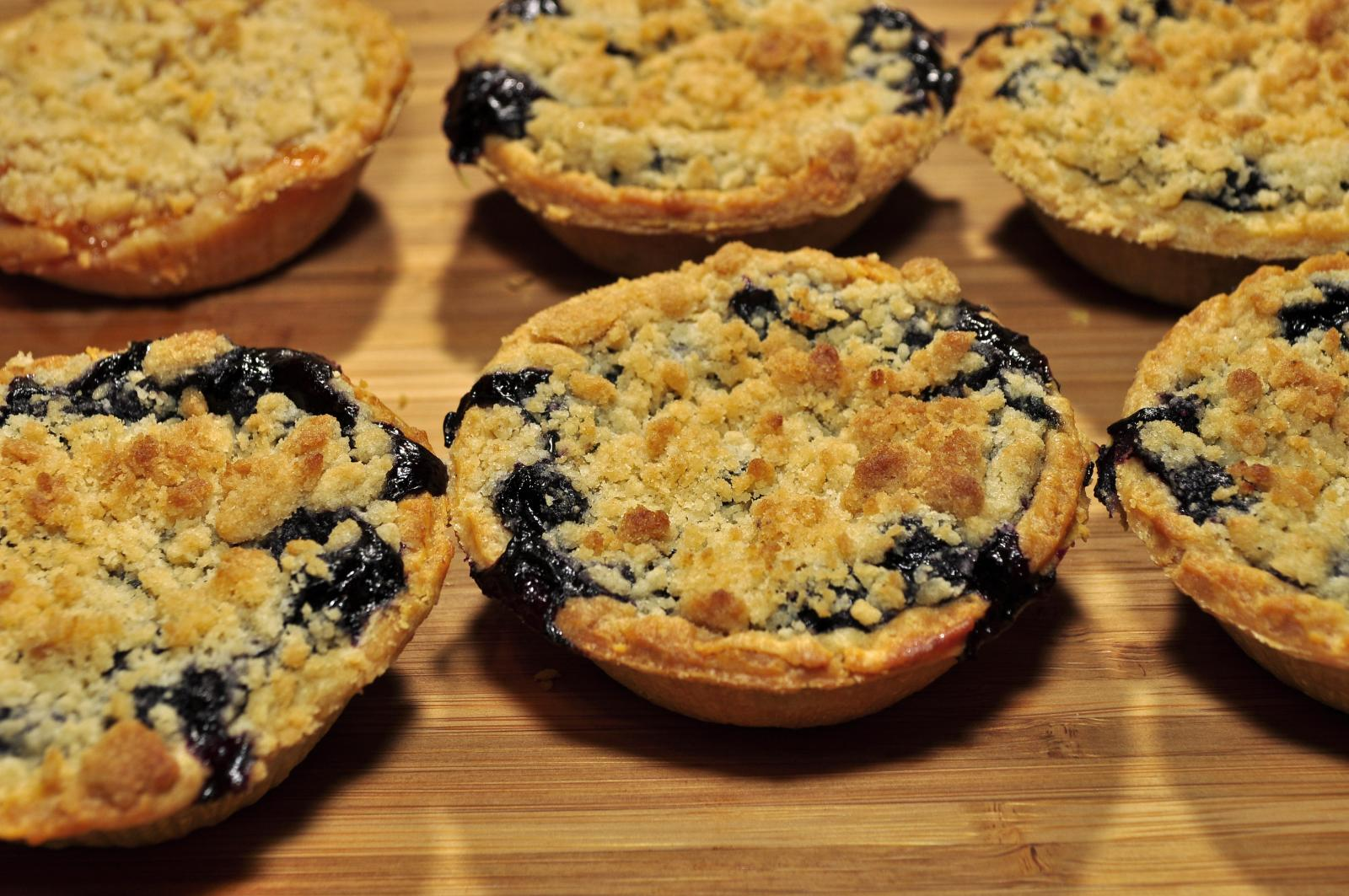
Miniature blueberry pies

== See also ==
- List of pies, tarts and flans
