= Homity pie =

British potato and leek pie

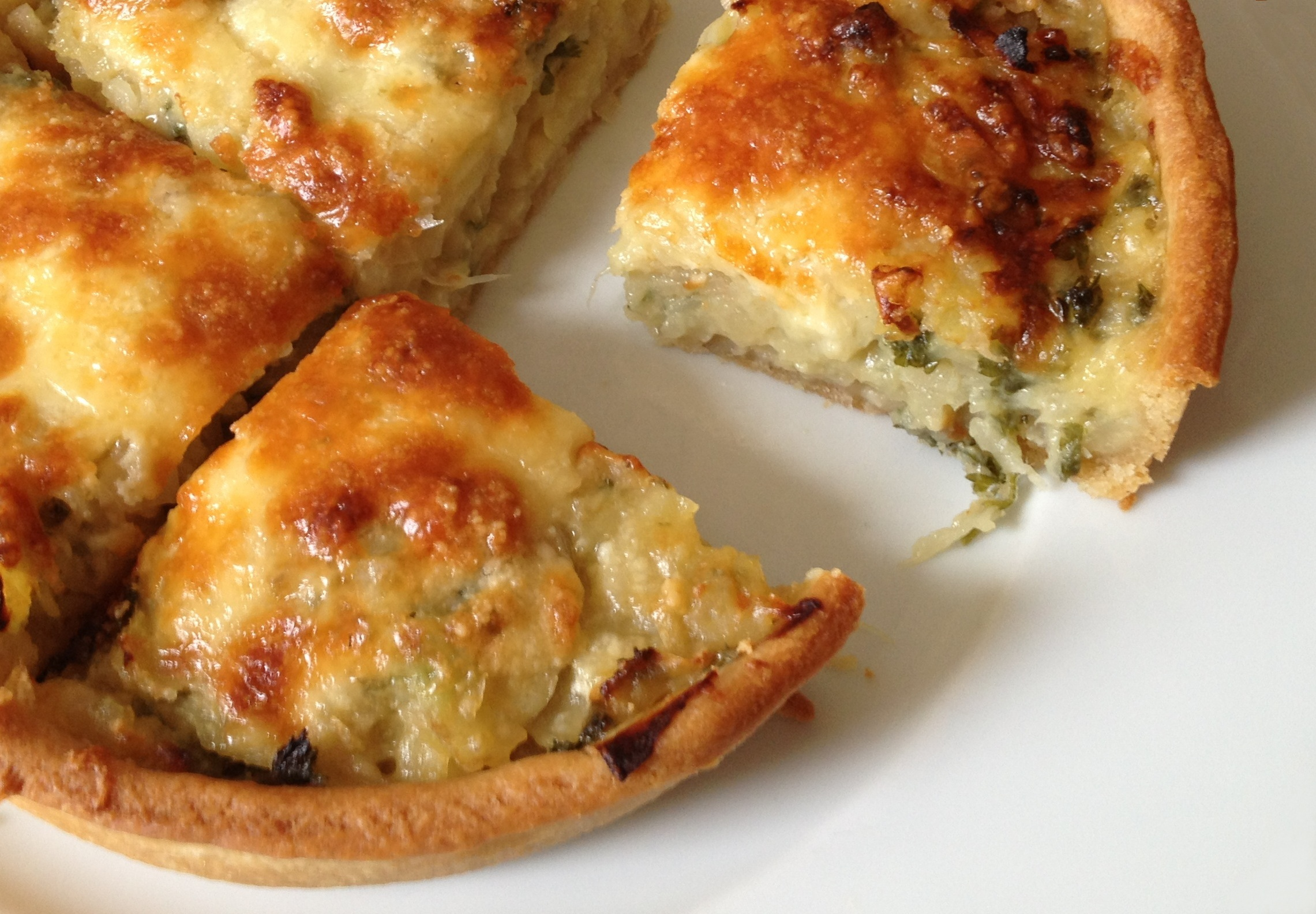
- Type: Savoury pie
- Place of origin: Great Britain
- Main ingredients: Pastry shell, potatoes, onions, leeks, cheese

Homity pie is a traditional British open vegetable pie. The pastry case contains a filling of potatoes and an onion and leek mixture, which is then covered with cheese.

There is little known on the exact history of the dish. It is sometimes called 'Devon Pie', deriving from the belief that it is an English country recipe originating from Devon. Its origins are also claimed to date from the Women's Land Army of the Second World War and the restrictions imposed by wartime rationing. What is known however is that the dish's mainstream popularity came from Cranks Vegetarian Restaurant, which opened in London in 1961, when vegetarianism gained support from the hippie subculture.

== See also ==
- List of pies, tarts and flans
