= Chestnut pie =

Pie prepared with chestnuts as a primary ingredient

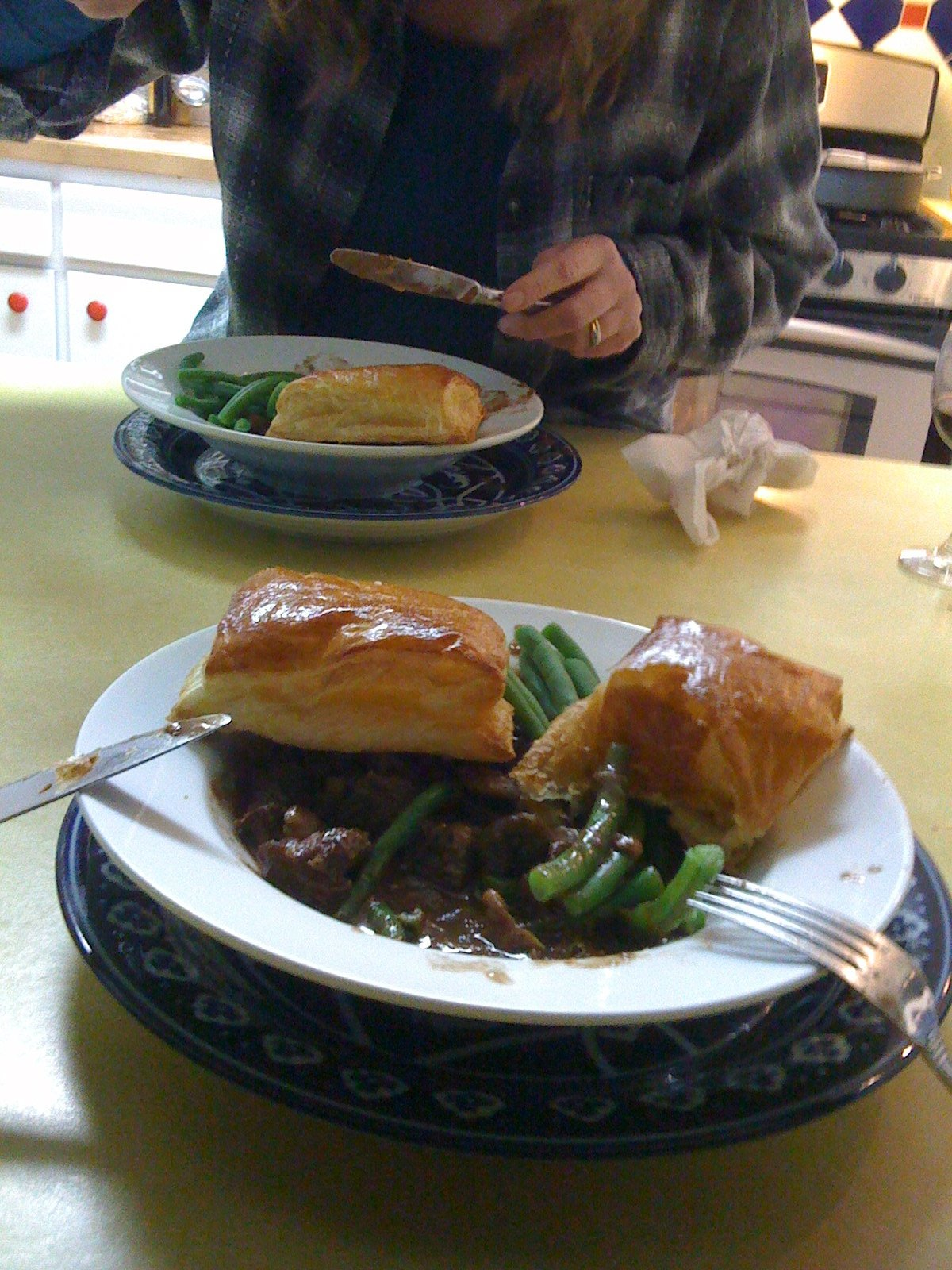
Chestnut pie with beef

Chestnut pie is a pie prepared with chestnuts as a primary ingredient. It is a part of the French cuisine (known as a Tarte à la châtaigne or Gâteau Ardéchois) and Italian cuisine (known as Castagnaccio) where it has been documented as dating back to the 15th century. It is also a part of the cuisine of the Southern United States. Shelled whole or chopped chestnuts may be used, which may be boiled or roasted. A chestnut purée may also be used. It may be prepared as a savory or sweet pie.

== History ==
Chestnut pie has been documented back to the Middle Ages in French cookbooks and to the 15th century in Italy, in the book De honesta voluptate et valetudine ("On honourable pleasure and health") written by the gastronomist Bartolomeo Platina. Platina's recipe, titled torta ex castaneís, called for the use of boiled and ground chestnuts in the pie. The chestnuts were ground using a mortar and pestle, milk was added and then the mixture was strained. After this step, the ingredients for a spelt tart were added. The use of saffron was recommended to add coloration to the dish.

In the 16th century, the pie was prepared and documented by Bartolomeo Scappi in his 1570 book Opera dell'arte del cucinare, which was focused upon Italian Renaissance cuisine. The recipe included the use of dried and fresh chestnuts in the pie. Scappi's recipe recommended using chestnuts that were not entirely ripened, gathered in August.

An 1858 recipe for sweet chestnut pie uses chestnuts glazed with orange flowers, in the dish's preparation, which are placed inside the pie.

A 1908 recipe for a savory chestnut pie uses shelled chestnuts, Spanish onion, haricot stock, salt and pepper.

== Savory chestnut pie ==
Savory chestnut pie may be prepared with various additional ingredients such as mushrooms, garlic onion, celery, leeks and butternut squash, among others. A 1915 recipe uses boiled and shelled chestnuts, canned mushrooms, a white sauce and a biscuit dough in preparation of the dish.

== Sweet chestnut pie ==
Sweet chestnut pie may be prepared as a cream pie. (Note: Chestnut Pie Ingredients: 500 grams (1 pound plus) chestnuts, 1% cups sugar, 1 pint milk, Vi cup bitter chocolate, 1 cup (~240 mL) flour, 2 eggs and 3 egg yolks, ...) Chocolate may be used as an ingredient in sweet chestnut pie. It may be served topped with whipped cream. In France, tarte à la châtaigne is eaten as a dessert.

== See also ==
- Cashew pie
- Chestnut cake
- List of Italian dishes
- List of pies, tarts and flans
- Peanut pie
- Walnut pie
