= Peanut pie =

Pie originating from the southern United States

Peanut pie is a pie that is part of the cuisine of the Southern United States, in the Tidewater region, where peanuts are a common crop.

Peanuts arrived in North America in the 18th-century with African slaves. Peanut pie was originally considered a slave food, but by the 1940s peanuts were widely consumed, and an advertisement for corn syrup (used to make the sweet, sticky pie filling) claimed that peanut pies could "make even your deepest-dyed Yankee start complimenting you with a southern accent." The pie was popular in Virginia and North Carolina. In North Carolina it was a standard dish to serve at family reunions or church events. First lady Rosalynn Carter was known for her peanut meringue pie.

The sweet filling is made from corn syrup, sugar and eggs, similar to how pecan pie filling is prepared. Molasses, sorghum, pure cane syrup or maple syrup are sometimes used in place of corn syrup. Some recipes include heavy cream or cream cheese in the filling, while others may include chocolate, cayenne pepper, cinnamon, nutmeg or bourbon. The finished pie is served warm and may be topped with whipped cream, a dessert sauce or served à la Mode. It can be made as individual mini-pies and frozen. It can be served as a kosher dessert.

== See also ==
- Cashew pie
- Chestnut pie
- List of peanut dishes
- List of pies, tarts and flans
- Pecan pie
- Walnut pie
