= Walnut pie =

Pie prepared with walnuts

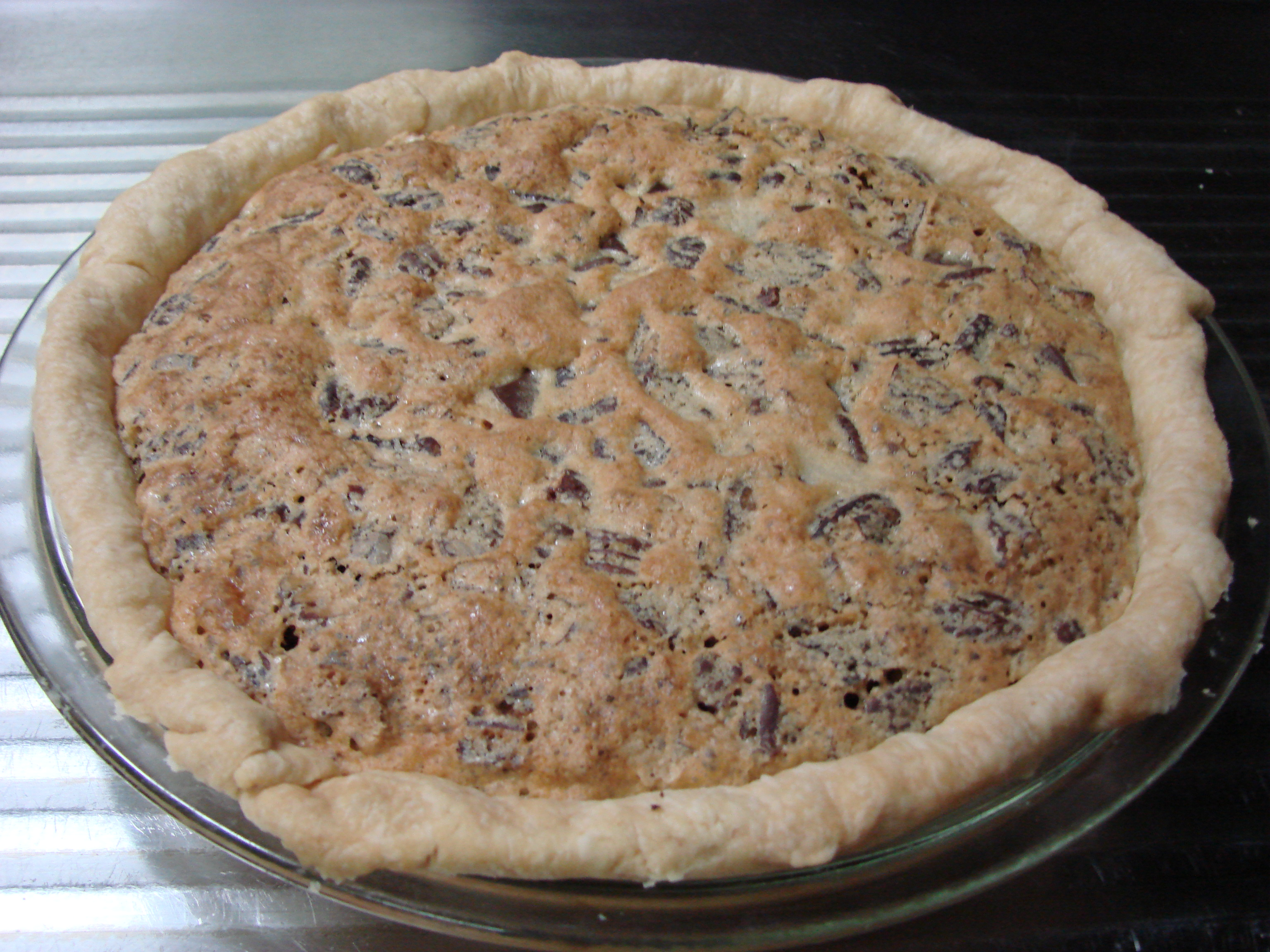
A chocolate-walnut pie

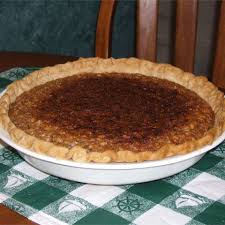
A maple-walnut pie

Walnut pie is a pie prepared with walnuts as a primary ingredient. Whole or chopped walnuts may be used, or both, and toasted walnuts may be used. It may be prepared as a cream pie, and may include maple syrup, molasses, and cinnamon as ingredients. It may be prepared with a sweet filling base prepared with corn syrup, sugar, and eggs, similar to pecan pie filling. Chocolate and honey may also be used. Walnut pie may be prepared using fruits, such as raisins, figs, plums, and cranberries, among others. Walnut pie may be served at room temperature or warmed. It may be topped with whipped cream or served à la Mode.

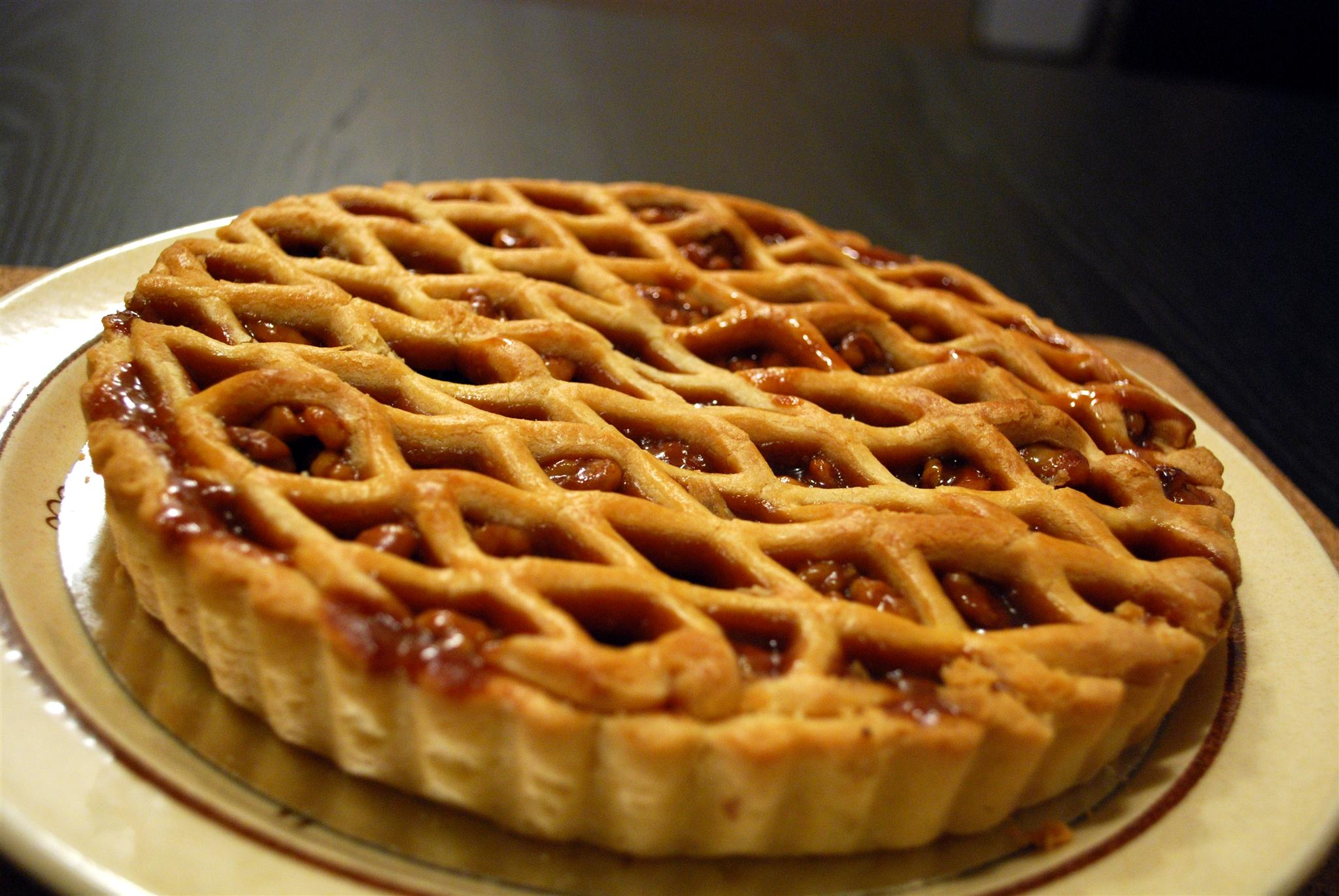
A walnut tart

== See also ==
- Bündner Nusstorte, a walnut pie made in Switzerland
- List of pies, tarts, and flans
- Cashew pie
- Chestnut pie
- Date and walnut loaf
- Peanut pie
- Walnut and coffee cake
- Walnut soup
- Pecan pie

== Bibliography ==
- Varozza, G.; Kerr, K. (2014). The Amish Baking Cookbook:. Harvest House Publishers. ISBN 978-0-7369-5538-6.
