= Rijstevlaai =

Pie with a filling based on rice pudding

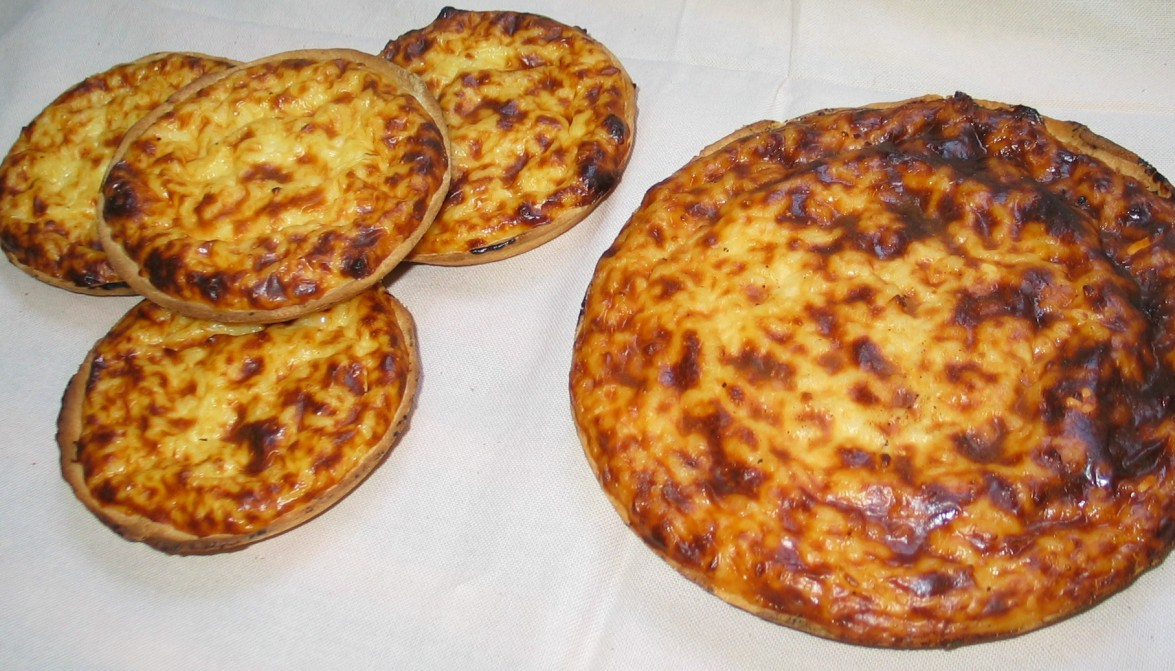
- Type: Vlaai
- Place of origin: Belgium, The Netherlands and Germany
- Main ingredients: Rice pudding

In Belgian and Dutch cuisine, tarte au riz (French: rice pie), rijsttaart(je)/rijstevlaai (Dutch: rice flan), or German: Reisfladen (German: rice flan), is a pie with a filling based on rice pudding. Rijstevlaai is a type of vlaai.

It is native to Verviers and popular around the wider region of Eastern Belgium, south-eastern Netherlands and the German region around Aachen. Typically they are made 'single-crust'—with no layer of pastry covering the top, although a top crust has been used in older recipes.

Traditionally, rijstevlaai are made from unpasteurized cow's milk and stored at room temperature until eaten. This led Afsca, the Belgian food safety ministry, to study the potential health risks posed by the pies. In September 2016, Afsca announced that the pies could be stored at room temperature for up to 12 hours without significant health risks.

Recipes for the tart date back to at least 1604. Flemish and Walloon versions of the dessert differ slightly, with Flemish and Dutch versions adding custard to the pudding filling, while Walloon versions only add eggs.

== See also ==
- Rice pudding
- Ryžový nákyp
