= Caramel tart =

Australian pastry

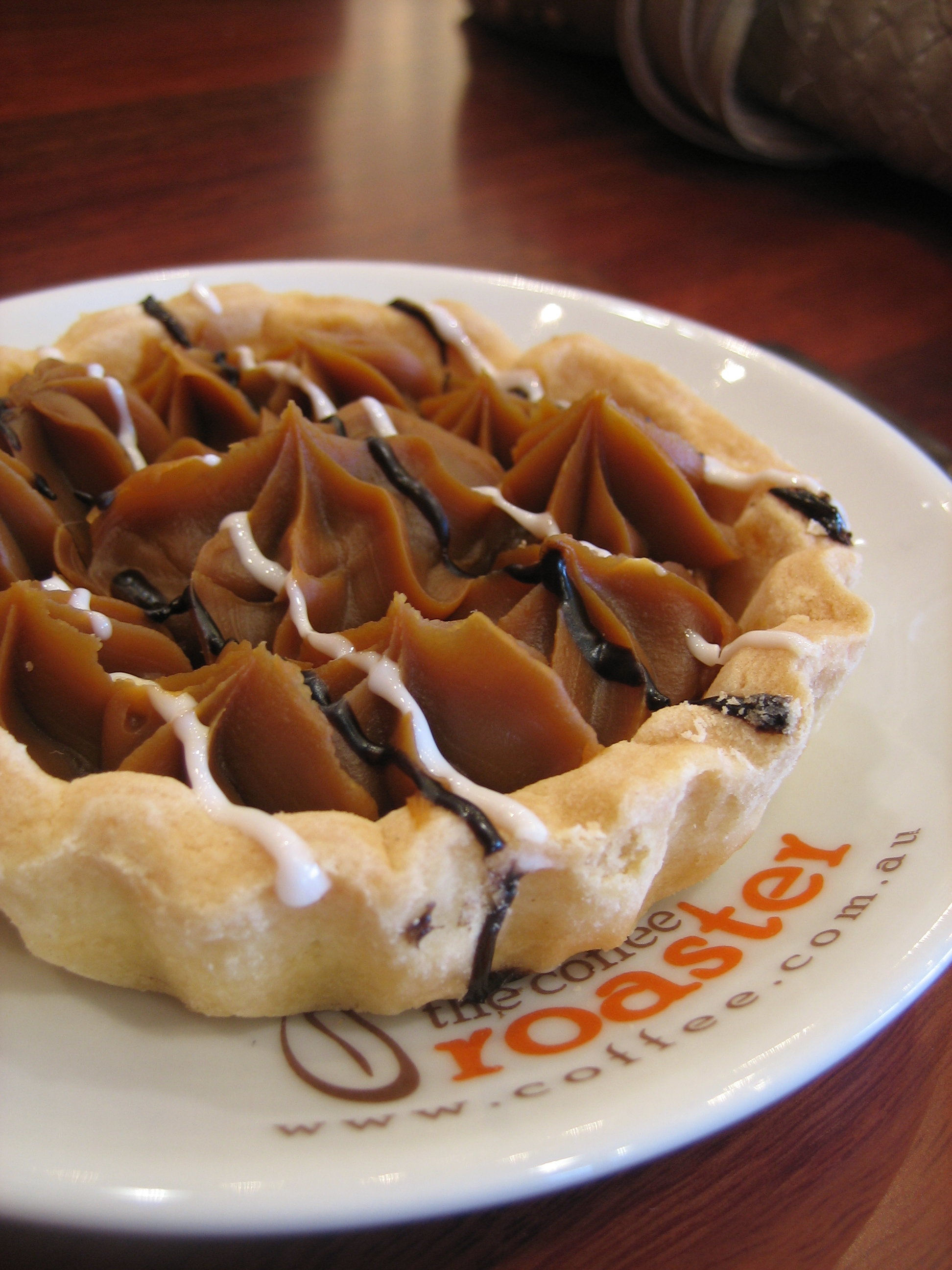
- Type: Tart
- Place of origin: Australia
- Region or state: New South Wales and Queensland
- Main ingredients: Pie crust, caramel

A caramel tart is a sweet tart, filled with a soft piped caramel filling found in New South Wales and Queensland in Australia, although noticeably absent in other areas. They are sometimes also topped with cream or drizzled with chocolate.

== See also ==
- List of pies, tarts and flans
