= Ryžový nákyp =

Rice pudding in Slovak and Czech cuisine

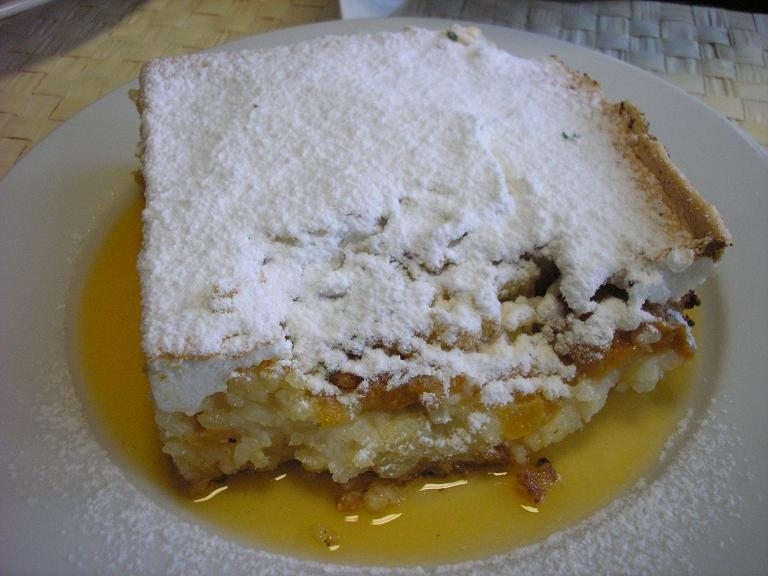
- Type: Cake
- Course: Second course, main course or dessert
- Place of origin: Slovakia, Czech Republic
- Serving temperature: Warm or cold
- Main ingredients: Rice, milk, eggs
- Ingredients generally used: Fruit, fruit compote

In Slovak and Czech cuisine, ryžový nákyp (Slovak pronunciation: ['riʐɔʋiː naːkip]; Czech: rýžový nákyp, Czech pronunciation: ['rɪ:ʒoviː naːkɪp], translate to “rice cake”) is a cake-like rice pudding made of rice, milk, eggs, butter, and sometimes raisins or other dried fruit. It is usually served with apricot, peach, plum, cherry or other fruit compote, sprinkled with powdered sugar, or topped with beaten egg white. It may be served as a second course, a main dish or a dessert. It may be served warm or cold.

Taste Atlas says the dish "is usually preceded by a hearty bowl of soup." It is considered a comfort food in Czech cuisine.

== See also ==
- Rijstevlaai
