= Monroe Boston Strause =

Monroe Boston Strause was an American piemaker whose innovations included graham-cracker crust, chiffon pie, and black-bottom pie. He was a "pie celebrity" whose name was "a household word."

Strause was born in 1900 in Los Angeles. In 1919 he was hired by his uncle who ran a wholesale pie business. In his early twenties, Strause took over the business, following his uncle's retirement. He became a consultant in the 1930s after selling his company.

Because of improvements in oven reliability and consistency, homemade and increasingly complex cakes had been overtaking pie as a popular American dessert, which inspired Strause to his experimentations. He considered pie to be the "Great American Dessert," superior to most other foods.

Strause's technique was more scientific in nature; he called his recipes "formulas." The publisher of his book Pie Marches On described it this way: "He has reduced pie baking to an exact science and measures each ingredient with the care of a pharmacist." His focus on quality combined with secrecy and showmanship allowed him, according to The Globe & Mail, to earn "a bank president’s salary out of pie."

He was an early pioneer of the celebrity chef ethos. In 1960, Strause was hired as a consultant by Cannon Foods Inc. of Bridgeville, Delaware, to create recipes based on Cannon food products.

Strause and his wife Violet Marian had a daughter, born May 21, 1938, and a son.

Strause died in 1981.

== Books ==
- Pies for Profit (1938)
- Pie Marches On (1939)

== Patents ==
- Dry grater
- Meringue pie
- Pie marker, method of finishing meringue pies and the resulting meringue pie
- Method of making fruit pie

=== Images from patents ===
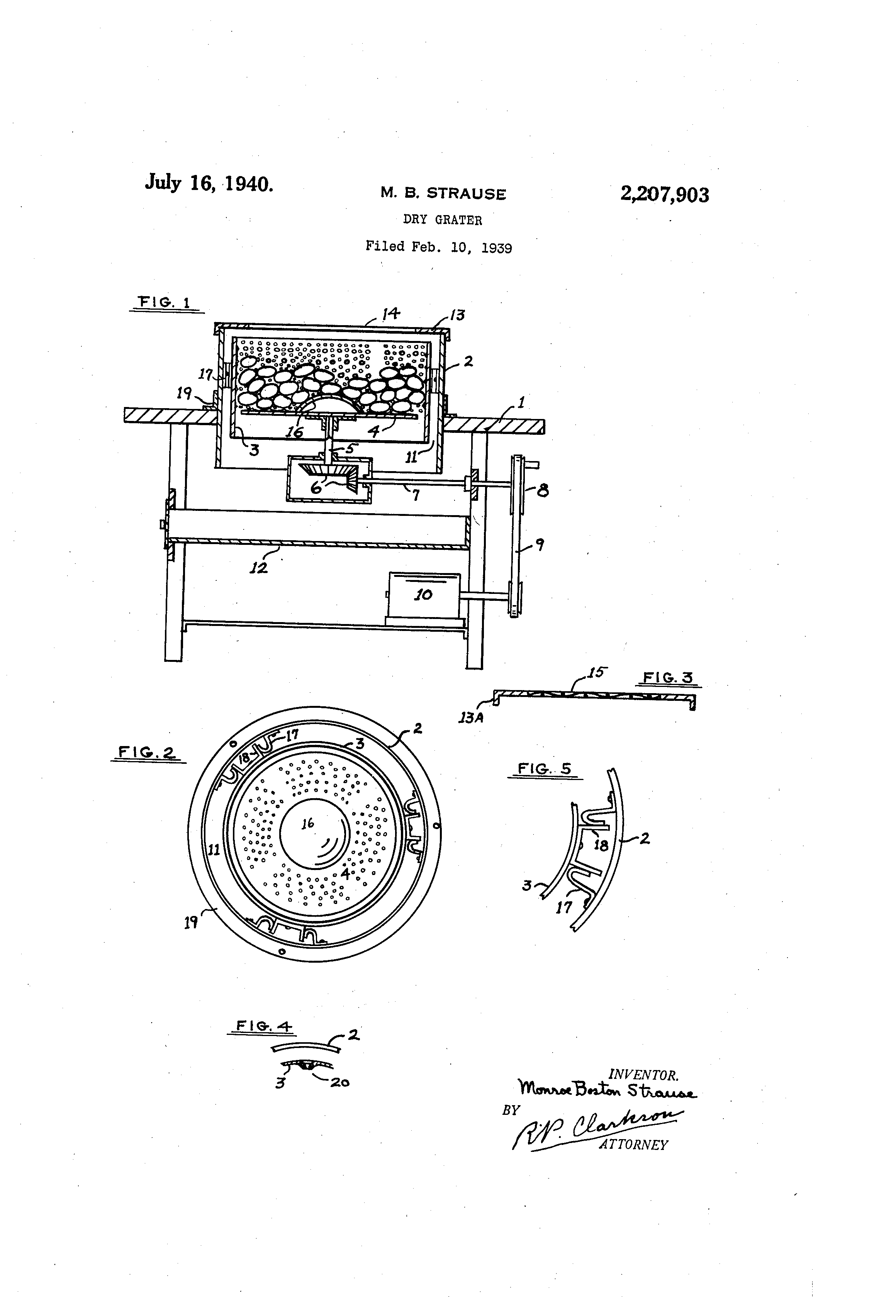
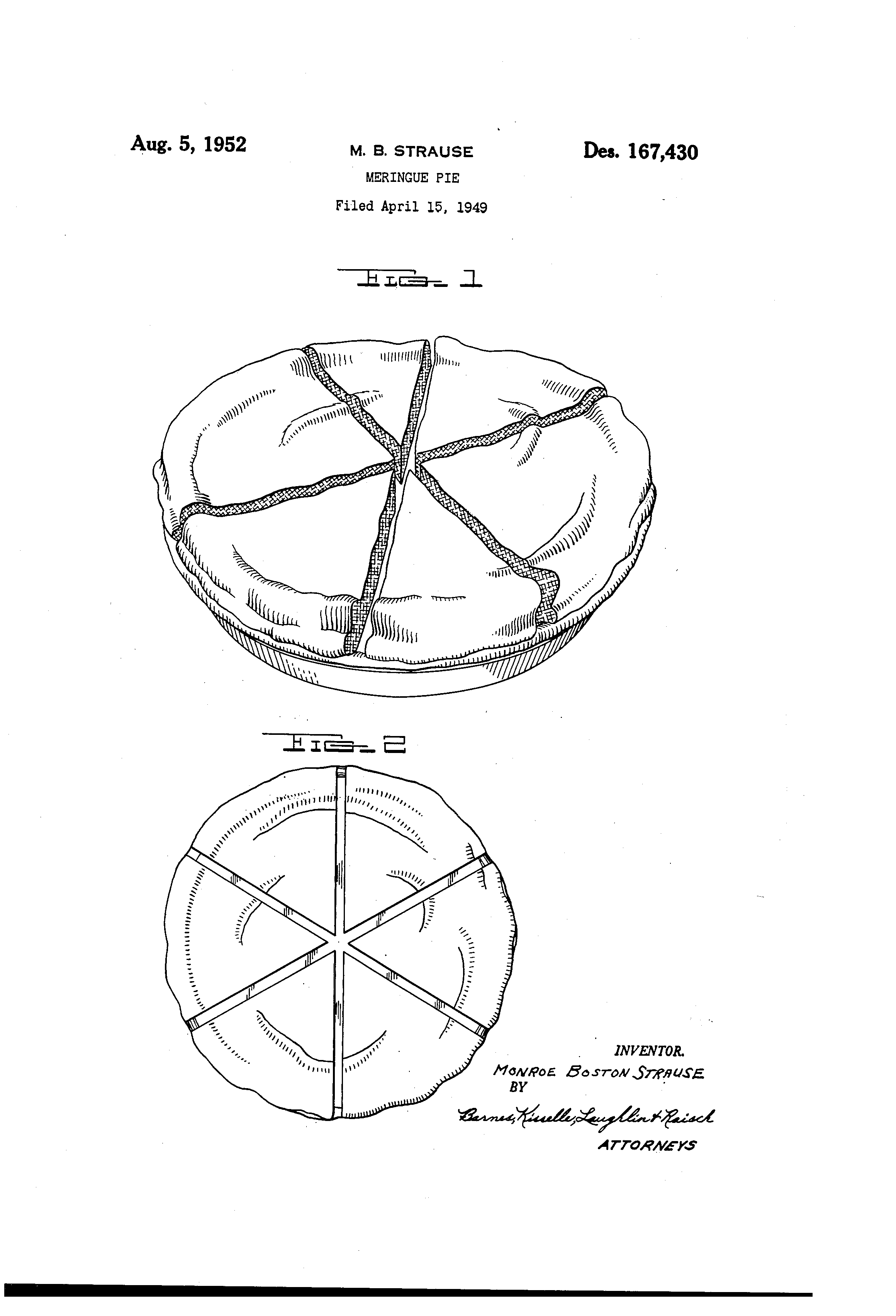
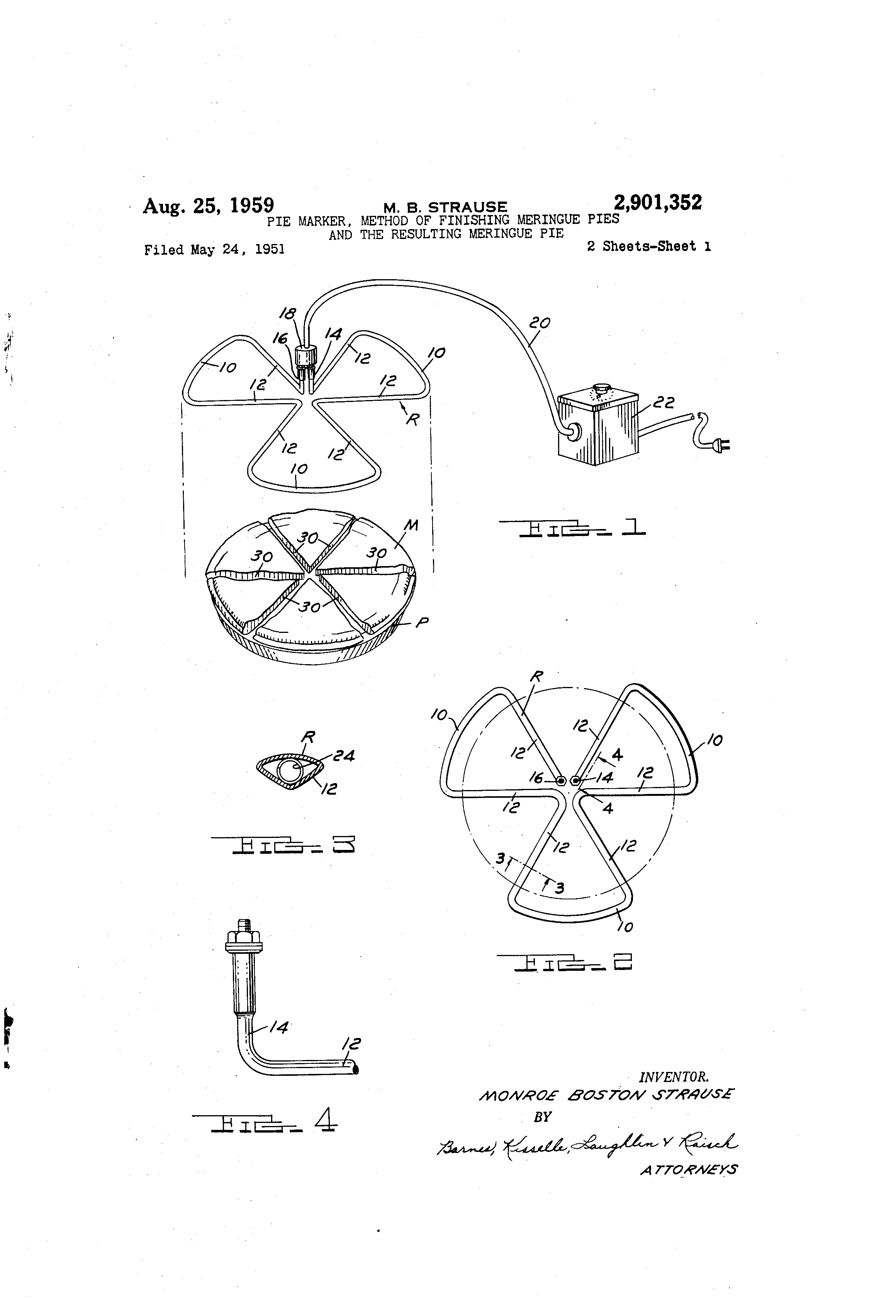
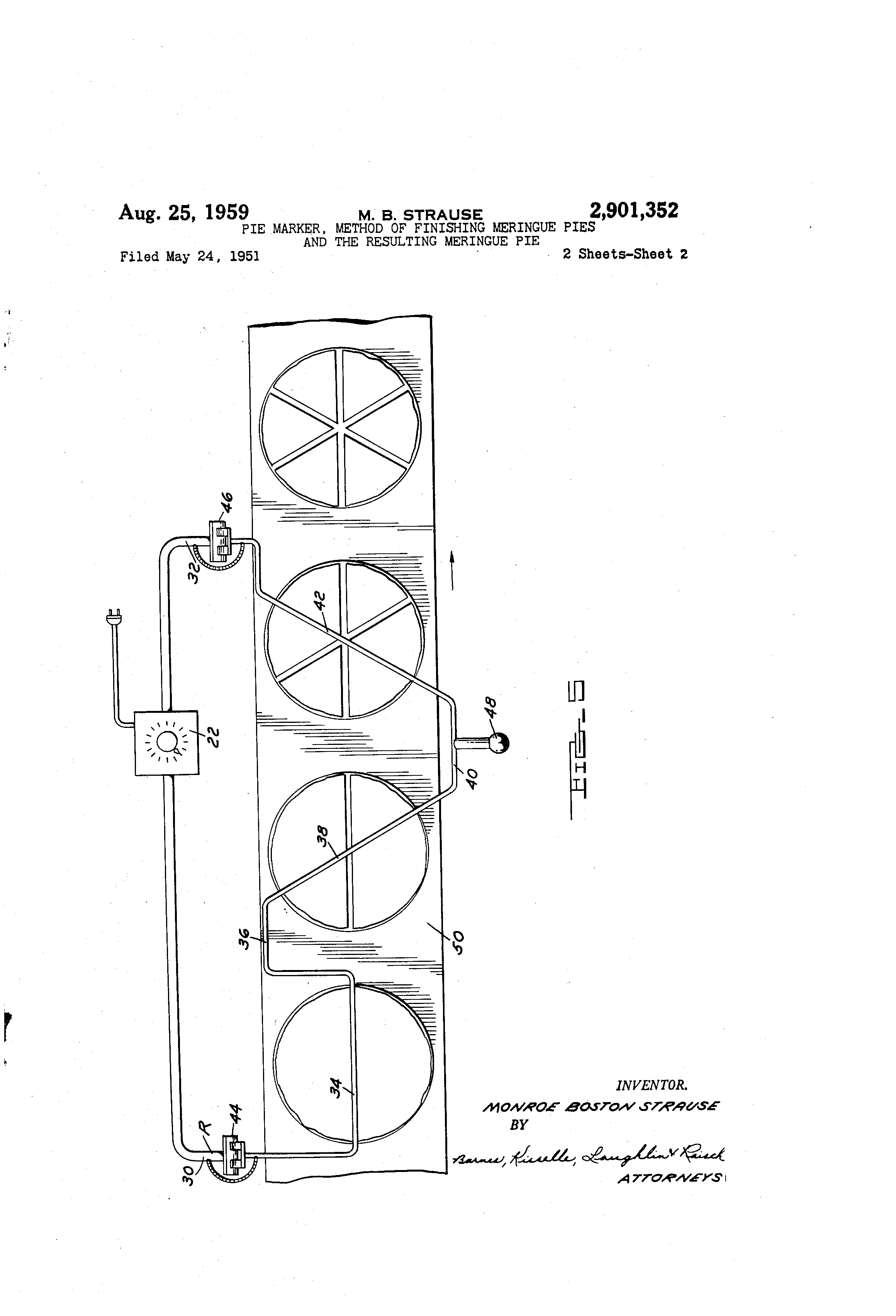
