= Lanttusupikas =

Finnish pie

- Alternative names: Syrjikäs
- Type: Pasty
- Place of origin: Finland
- Main ingredients: Swede, rye flour, pork, wheat flour, butter, salt

Lanttusupikas, also known as Syrjikäs, is a traditional pastry from Finland.

Lanttusupikas is a double-folded buttered flaky crust pie, filled with thin, braised swede slices and pork loin.

== See also ==
- List of pies
