= Curry pie =

Variety of savoury pie

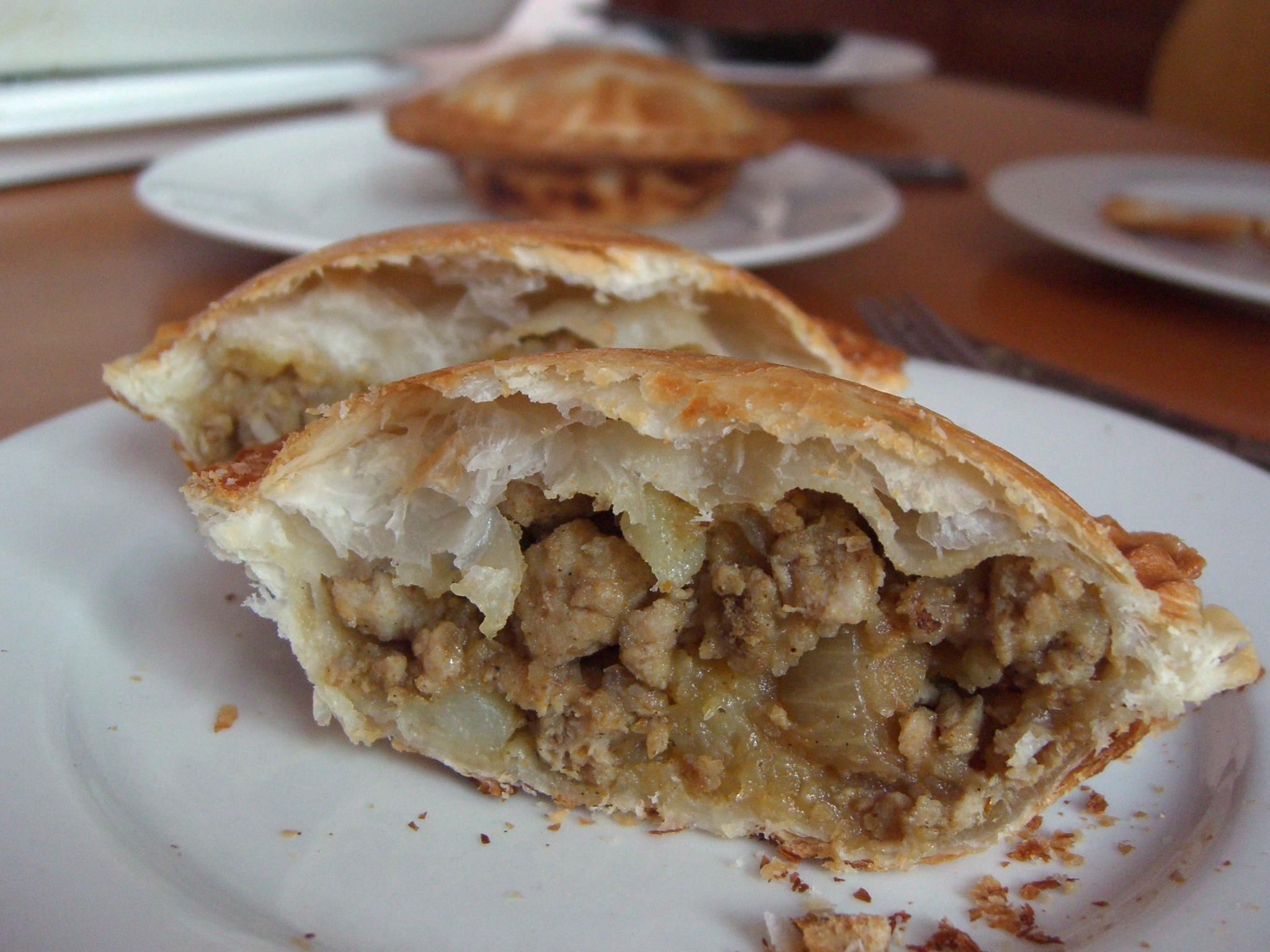
- Alternative names: Curry Puff
- Type: Savoury pie
- Course: Snack
- Place of origin: United Kingdom
- Serving temperature: Hot
- Main ingredients: Shortcrust pastry, curry
- Variations: Indian curry, Thai curry

Curry pie is a variety of savoury pie served in the United Kingdom, Australia and New Zealand. It is made from curry gravy, usually containing an assortment of fillings and enclosed in a pastry shell. Curry pies are a popular pub meal in the United Kingdom, often accompanied by chips.

== Ingredients ==
In Australia and New Zealand, as well as serving pies made with an Indian curry filling, a variety of curry pie with Thai curry filling is also popular, often made with either red, green or yellow curry.

== See also ==
- List of pies, tarts and flans
- Curry beef turnover
- Curry puff
- Curry bread
