= Chiffon pie =

Type of dessert

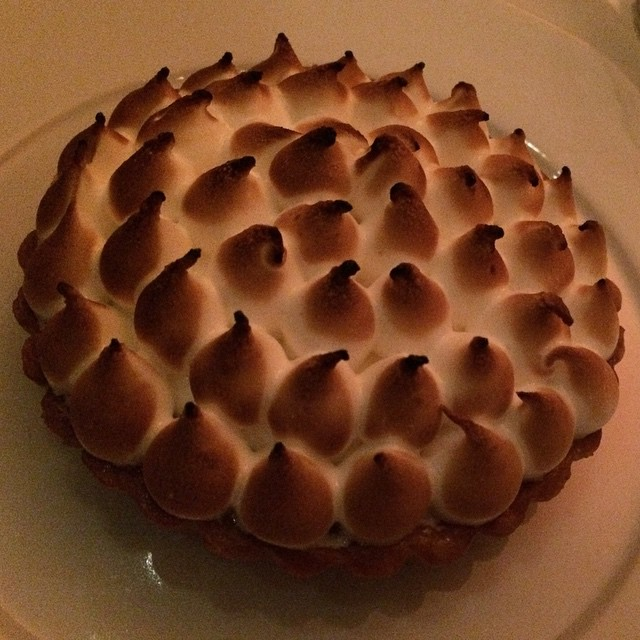
- A Meyer lemon chiffon pie
- Type: Pie
- Course: Dessert
- Place of origin: United States
- Created by: Monroe Boston Strause
- Invented: 1926

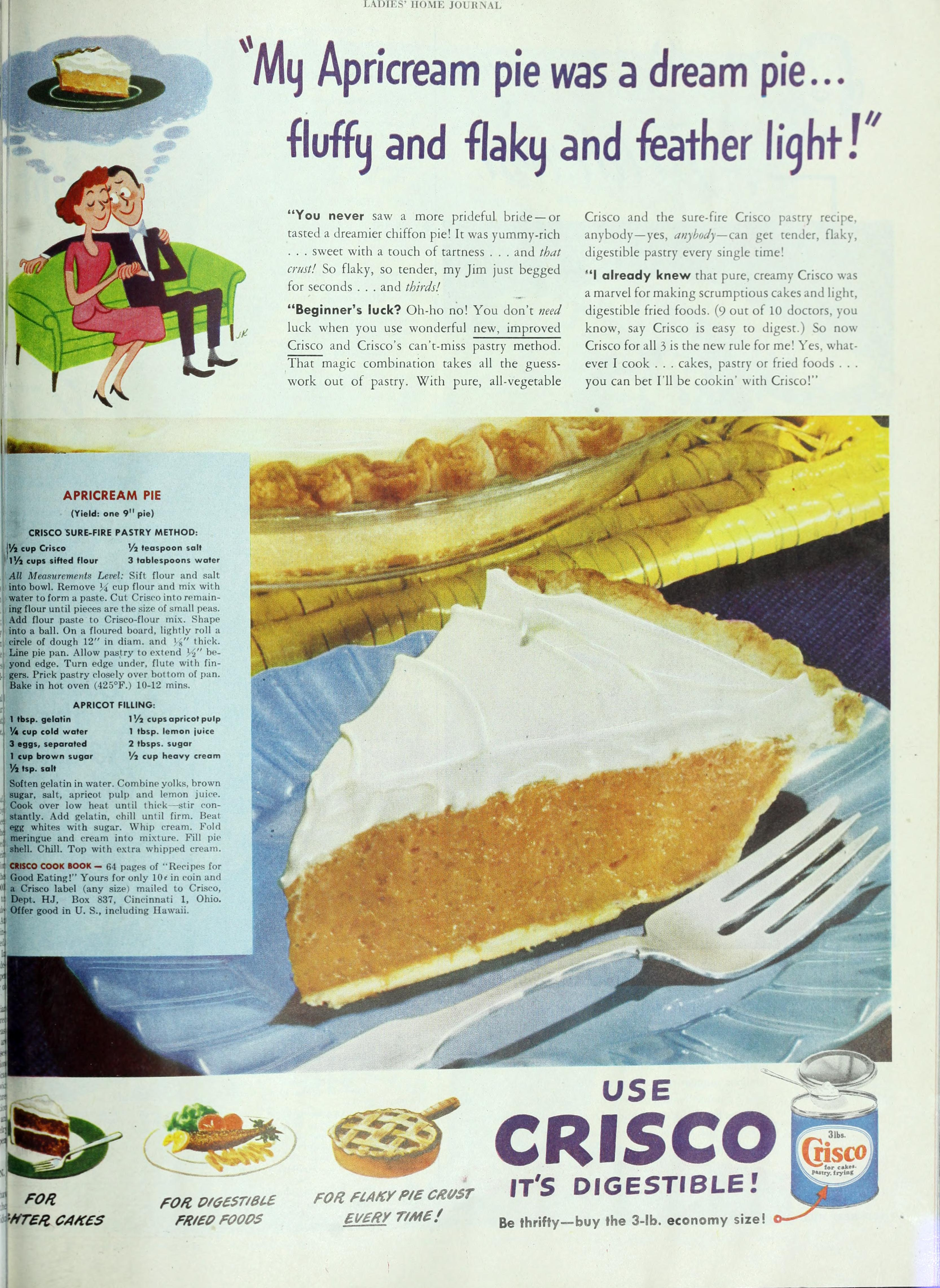
Lemon chiffon pie, gained popularity from housewives of America, featured in the Ladies' Home Journal

A chiffon pie is a type of pie from the United States, that consists of a special type of airy filling in a crust. The filling is typically produced by folding meringue into a mixture resembling fruit curd (most commonly lemon) that has been thickened with unflavored gelatin to provide a light, airy texture; it is thus distinguished from a cream pie or mousse pie, which achieve lightness by folding in whipped cream rather than meringue. This filling is then put into a pre-baked single-crust pie shell of variable composition and chilled. This same technique can also be used with canned pumpkin to produce pumpkin chiffon pie.

The preparation of a mock chiffon pie can be simplified by using flavored gelatin mix and artificial whipped cream substitute.

== Origin ==
The chiffon pie was invented in Los Angeles in 1926 by Monroe Boston Strause, who was known as the Pie King. The original recipe called for beaten egg whites to be folded into a cornstarch-thickened liquid. Strause was dissatisfied with existing cream pies and had been made ill by a cornstarch pudding as a child. Strause claimed it was his mother who compared it to chiffon when she first saw it.

Besides the new filling, the pie also introduced dome-shaped filling and graham-cracker crust.

The popularity of the pie was such that Strause traveled as much as 30,000 miles a year teaching the technique to hotels and restaurants.

== See also ==
- Black bottom pie, another pie Strause claimed to invent
