= Bündner Nusstorte =

Pastry

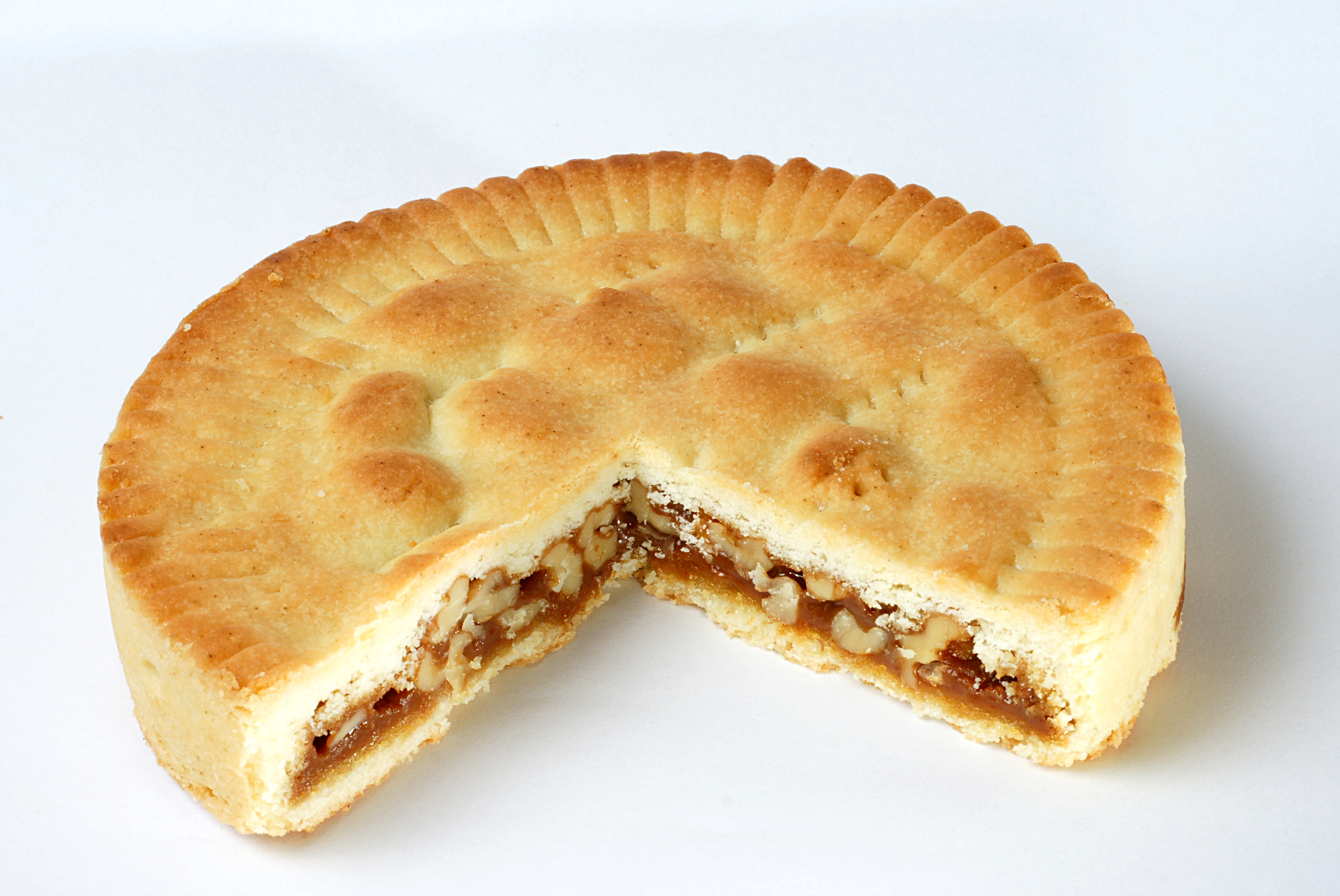
- Type: Pastry
- Place of origin: Switzerland
- Region or state: Graubünden
- Main ingredients: Shortcrust pastry (flour, sugar, egg, butter); Filling: sugar, cream, milk, nuts (commonly walnuts)

The Bündner Nusstorte (Graubünden nut pastry), also known as Engadiner Nusstorte, is a traditional sweet, caramelised nut-filled pastry (generally walnut) from canton Graubünden in Switzerland. The modern filled Nusstorte was first widely available in the 1960s, though it was invented in the 1920s.

== History ==
While there are recipes for Nusstorte from the 19th century, they are different from the modern Nusstorte. These pastries contained nuts mixed into a dough, but were not filled. The modern, filled Nusstorte was developed by an Engadin (a region in Graubünden) baker named Fausto Pult in 1926.

In 1934 he sold the pastries at the Mustermesse in Basel, which introduced them to the wider world.

Because the climate in Graubünden is too cold for nut trees to thrive, the origin of nuts in their pastries is subject to some debate. One theory is that a baker, who had lived in France, brought nut trees back with him which he was able to plant in Val Bregaglia. Another theory, that comes up often in the literature, is that the traditional shortcrust pastry Fuatscha Grassa was crossed with a French nut pastry by confectioners from Graubünden living in France. When they returned to Graubünden, the idea was brought along. A third theory is that during the Middle Ages, many confectioners from Graubünden moved to Venice and for 300 years specialized in sweets. When they were expelled in 1766, the Graubünden confectioners traveled around Europe before many of them settled back in Graubünden. The idea of nut pastries could have easily come from one of these wandering cooks.

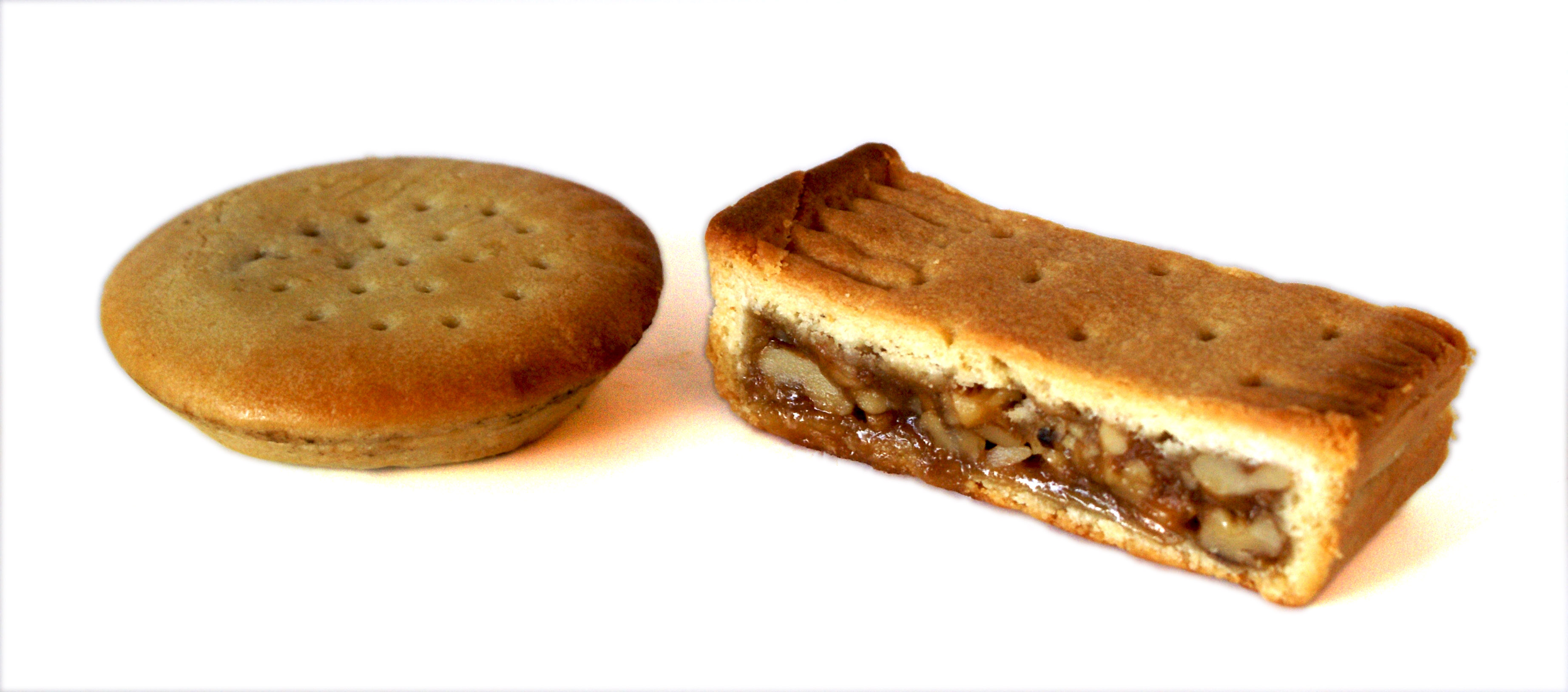

== Production ==
The Bündner Nusstorte is commonly made by small independent bakers scattered throughout Graubünden. For this reason, there are a variety of recipes, some of which are closely guarded secrets. The basic pastry is made of a classic shortcrust pastry, which contains flour, sugar, egg, butter and a bit of salt. The filling is made of caramelized sugar, to which heavy cream or milk and coarsely chopped nuts (commonly walnuts but rarely other nuts) are added. Some recipes include a little milk or honey.

The Bündner Nusstorte is produced throughout the entire canton and is one of the largest export products for independent bakers. It is estimated that Nusstorten sales represent 20 to 40% of the total sales for many bakers and are a major source of income.

Nowadays, Bündner Nusstorte is also available in supermarket chains, like Coop.

== Consumption ==
The Nusstorte, with a buttery crust, cream, and nut filling, is loaded with calories. They are generally cut into pieces and eaten for dessert, together with coffee or tea. They can be purchased throughout the year and are widely available over the internet. The Nusstorte will remain fresh for several months, which makes them popular as gifts and allows them to be shipped around the world.

== See also ==
- Walnut pie
- Confectionery
- Culinary Heritage of Switzerland
- List of pastries

== External sources ==
- Bündner Nusstorte in the online Culinary Heritage of Switzerland database.
