= Tourte de blettes =

Culinary specialty from Nice, France

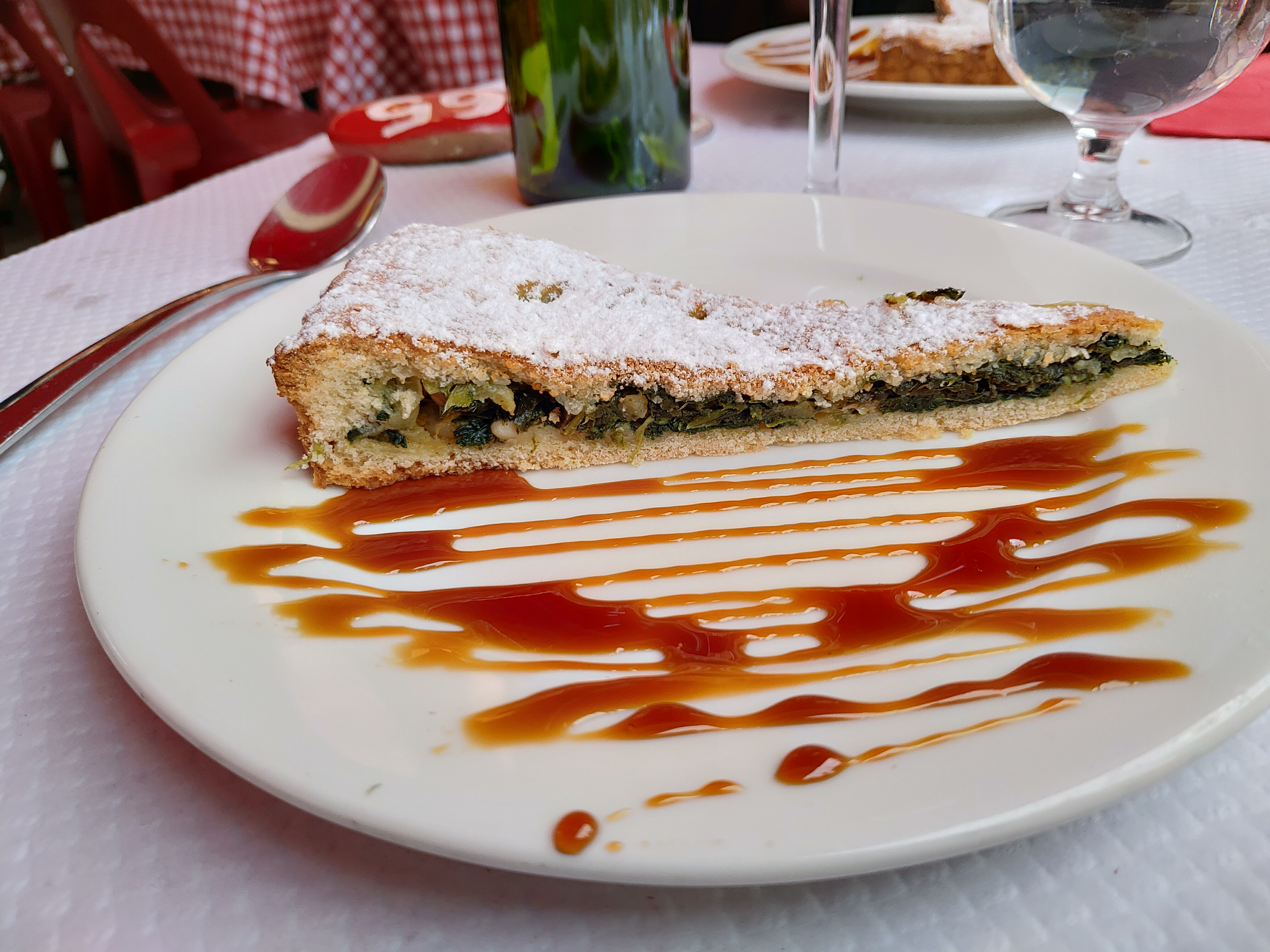
Tourte de blettes

Tourte de blettes (torta de blea in Niçois) is a pie made with Swiss chard, which can be served as a main course or as a sweet dessert. It is a culinary specialty of the city of Nice.

It is made with an olive oil–based crust, Swiss chard, raisins, pine nuts, Parmesan or Gruyère cheese, sugar, and apples. Other leafy vegetables can be used instead of chard, including leeks, cabbage, spinach, and radish greens.

The pie is a traditional dessert emblematic of the cuisine of Nice, whose origins date back to the Middle Ages. This pastry is part of a long tradition of "herb pies", which included leafy vegetables such as spinach. Chard has long been a common vegetable in the region as it does well in the dry climate, which allows it to grow almost all year round. The first written recipe for the chard pie dates back to the 15th century. Over the centuries, recipes have evolved. For example, in the 18th century, there was a pie made with spinach, sugar, almonds and candied lemon peel. It is one of the thirteen desserts of Christmas in the Niçoise version of the Provençal tradition. It is also traditionally eaten on New Year's Eve.

Despite the presence of chard (a vegetable very popular in Niçoise cuisine, used in particular to make ravioli), this is a pastry, eaten cold or warm. Finely chopped chard leaves are mixed with ingredients that vary depending on the recipe but always include pine nuts and raisins. The pie is most often served covered in powdered sugar. There are also savory versions made with chard, rice, pork and hard cheese.

Sweet or savory, the pie calls for a regional white wine such as a Côtes-de-Provence, a Coteaux-d'Aix-en-Provence, a Coteaux-Varois-en-Provence, a Pierrevert, or a Bellet.
