= Graham cracker crust =

Crumb crust made of crushed graham crackers

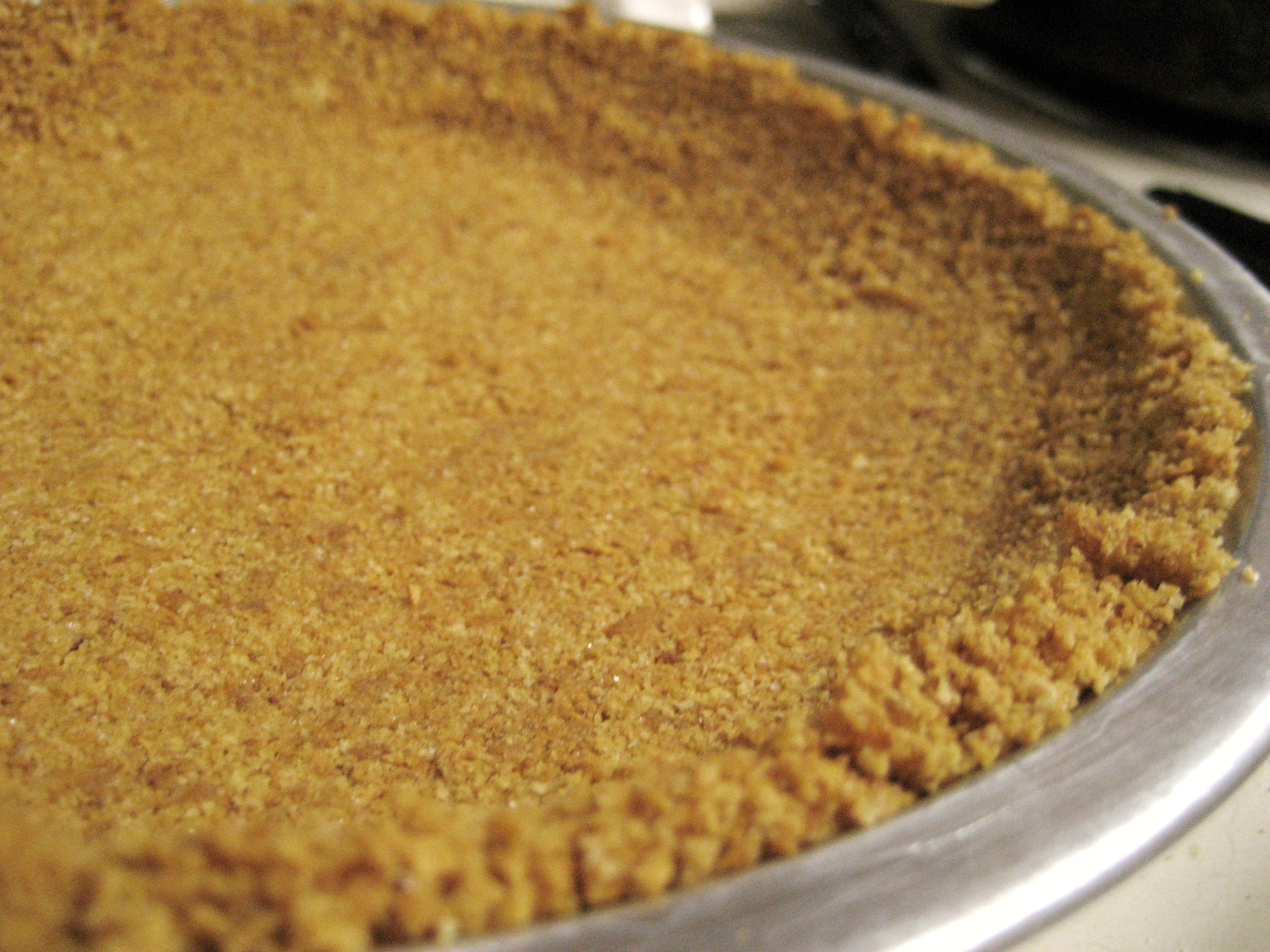
- An unbaked graham cracker crust
- Type: Crumb crust
- Course: Dessert
- Place of origin: United States
- Created by: Monroe Boston Strause
- Main ingredients: Graham crackers, sugar, butter or vegetable oil
- Variations: Chocolate graham cracker crust
- Other information: Popular in the United States

Graham cracker crust is a style of crumb crust made from crushed graham crackers. Graham crackers are a sweet American cracker made from unbleached, whole wheat graham flour. The crust is usually flavored and stiffened with butter or vegetable oil and sometimes sugar. Graham cracker crust is a very common type of crust for cheesecakes and cream pies in America.

Graham cracker crumb crusts are available as a mass-produced product in the United States, and typically consist of the prepared crust pressed into a disposable aluminum pie pan.

Variations use crushed cookies or Nilla wafers as substitutes for the graham crackers.

Graham cracker crusts may be baked or unbaked before filling.

The invention of the graham cracker crust is credited to Monroe Boston Strause, who was known as the Pie King and also invented the chiffon pie.

== Preparation and texture ==
Graham cracker crust is prepared by crushing crackers into fine crumbs, either with a food processor or manually using a rolling pin. The crumbs are combined with melted butter and, optionally, sugar before being pressed into the bottom and sides of a pie dish or springform pan. A flat-bottomed measuring cup or drinking glass can be used to distribute and compact the mixture evenly.

The texture of the finished crust depends partly on the size of the crumbs and the pressure applied during shaping. Finely crushed crackers help the mixture hold together, while insufficient compaction can produce a crumbly crust. Excessive pressure, however, may result in a dense, hard texture. The thickness of the crust along the sides of the dish is also important for preventing breakage when slices are removed.

Prebaking can produce a firmer base, particularly when the crust is intended to hold a soft or custard-like filling. Other preparations rely on refrigeration or freezing to help the crust retain its shape without baking.

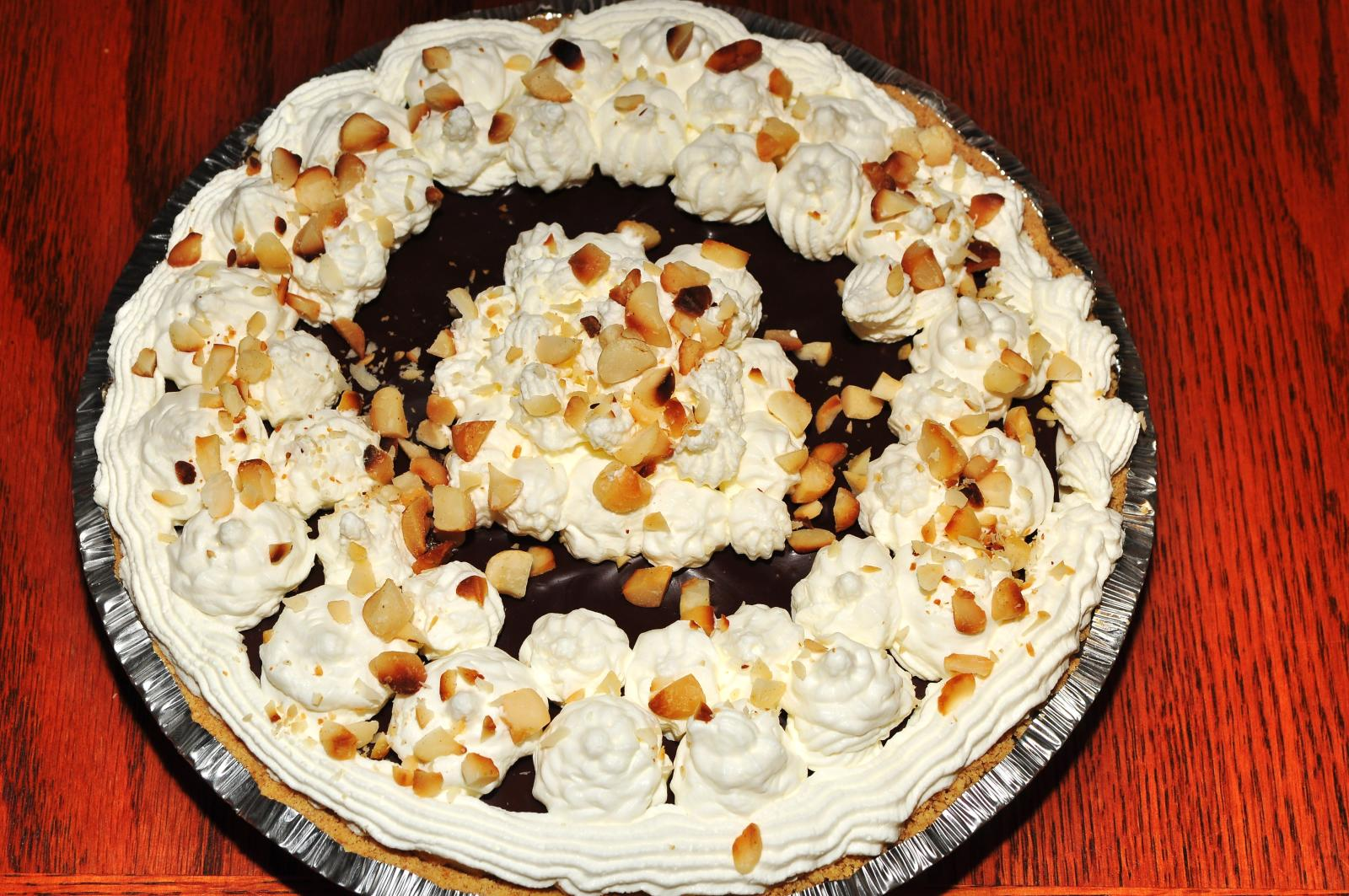
A chocolate cream pie with a graham cracker crust and macadamia nuts

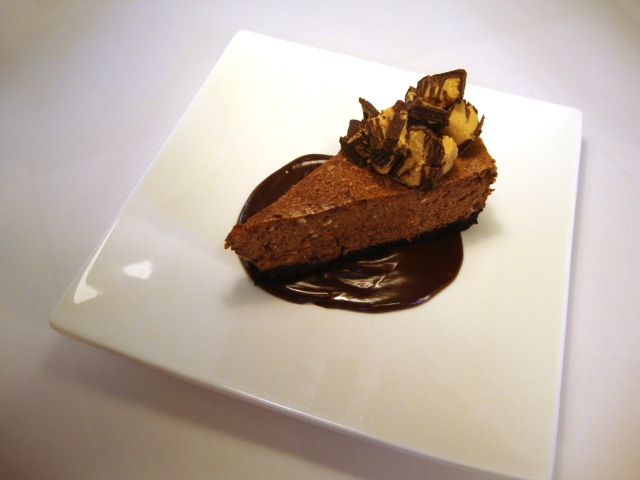
A slice of chocolate cheesecake with a chocolate graham cracker crust
