= Vlaai =

Pastry from the Dutch province of Limburg

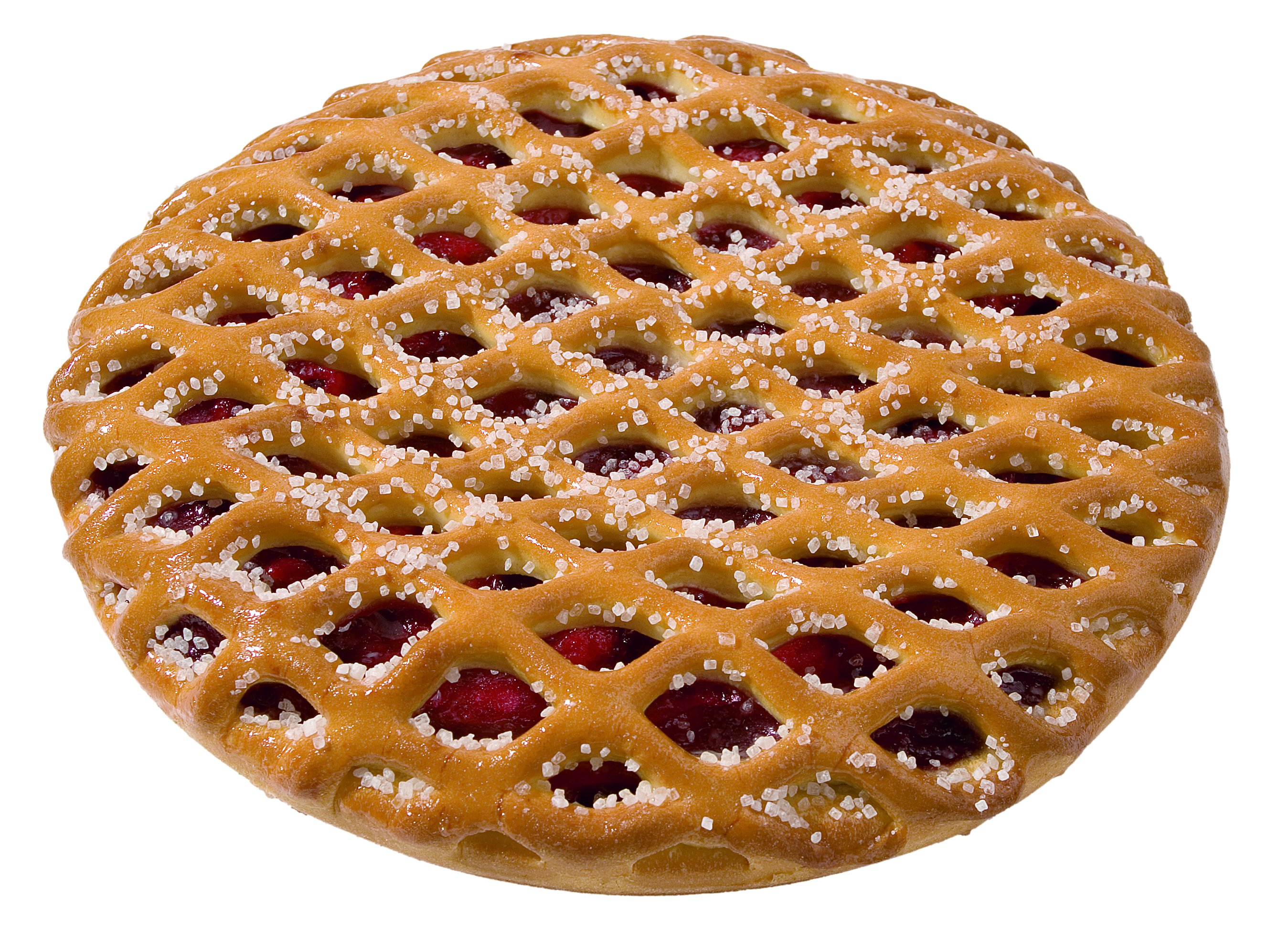
- Cherry vlaai
- Course: Dessert
- Place of origin: Netherlands, Belgium, Germany
- Region or state: Limburg
- Main ingredients: Yeast dough, fruits, berries

Limburgse vlaai (Limburgish: vlaai, vlaoj, vla or flaai, pl. vlaaien) is a dessert consisting of a yeasted dough and a filling, traditionally associated with the provinces of Limburg found both in the Netherlands and Belgium, as well as parts of Germany across the border.

Variations exist throughout the Netherlands, Belgium, and areas of the German state, such as North Rhine-Westphalia, near the border with the Netherlands. A vlaai is usually 26 to 31 centimetres in diameter. It is available with many different fruit fillings, such as cherry, apricot, strawberry, and plum. Other variations are a crumbled butter and sugar mix ("greumellevlaai" in Limburgish, "kruimelvlaai" in Dutch), and rice and custard porridge (rijstevlaai).

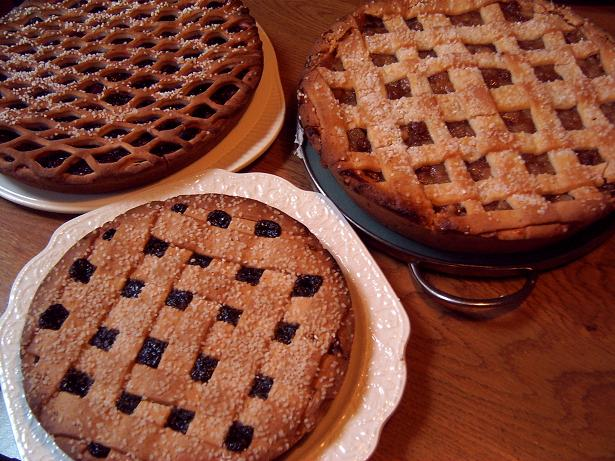
A type of vlaai known as laddervlaai, rastervlaai or linzenvlaai.

Vlaai is often eaten on special occasions and for significant life events, particularly in the Dutch province of Limburg, such as birthdays and funerals. When eaten on the occasion of a funeral, the vlaai is typically made with black plum (zwarte pruimenvlaai).

== History ==
Reliable information about the history of vlaaien is scarce. Though primarily known as a pastry of Limburg, they aren't purely limited to that region.

One legend asserts that vlaai dates back to before the 12th century. According to a mention in the chronicle of the abbey of Sint-Truiden (the extant copy dates to 1503), Duke Henry van Leuven laid siege to the city (located in modern-day Belgium) in 1189. "Honest and prudent eunuchs and burghers of the town" offered him "plăcintă" (as it was rendered in medieval Latin) that was baked following old local recipes. Supposedly, this persuaded Henry to give up the siege. "Placenta" is equated with the Middle Dutch word "vlade" but the legend is not otherwise verified, nor can it be certain exactly what baked goods might have been offered.

In the manuscript Gent KANTL, a Middle Dutch cookbook from the 15th century, there are several fillings listed for vlade which resemble fillings of either fruit or custard, as well as a hot-water-crust pastry recipe for vlade. It is not clear from the text alone whether the vlade recipes would have been put in a crust, and one of them specifically mentions filling a bowl; vla in modern Dutch refers to flan or pudding. However, it also lists pies (tarten) with apple or cherry filling that are specifically baked in bread (broot), which bear a stronger resemblance to modern vlaai.

A similar pie exists in the Pennsylvanian Cuisine, named "shoo-fly". This pie was introduced in Pennsylvania by Dutch and German immigrants in the second half of the 19th century. In structure identical to a "kruimelvlaai", it is also the inclusion of the name "fly" that sounds almost identical to how the Dutch pronounce the word "vlaai".

Until the mid-20th century, vlaai was considered a luxury item in Limburg that would only be eaten during celebrations. In the countryside they were almost always baked by the people themselves, usually in traditional bakehouses. The vlaaien would be served in the afternoon, during the coffee break, with usually two or three different slices per person. Because of the growing economic prosperity after the Second World War, people started eating them more often.

Vlaaien began to be more widely known outside of Limburg during the late 19th century, mostly because of growing tourism in Dutch southern Limburg. Many tourists took vlaai back home from local bakers. In 1986 the first vlaaien shop opened in Amsterdam. The sale of vlaaien by several supermarket chains also helped in popularizing the pastry. Maria Hubertina Hendrix, also known as "Antje van de Stasie", also helped spread the popularity outside of Limburg. In the early 20th century she sold her Weerter vlaaitjes at the train station in Weert; this caused the pastry to become well known by travelers from all over the Netherlands. After a while, the Weerter vlaaien were also sold in Nijmegen.

== Geographical indication ==
On 17 November 2022, the Netherlands and Belgium applied for protection of the designation Limburgse vlaai as a Protected Geographical Indication (PGI) in the European Union, which was granted starting 22 January 2024.
