= List of custard desserts =

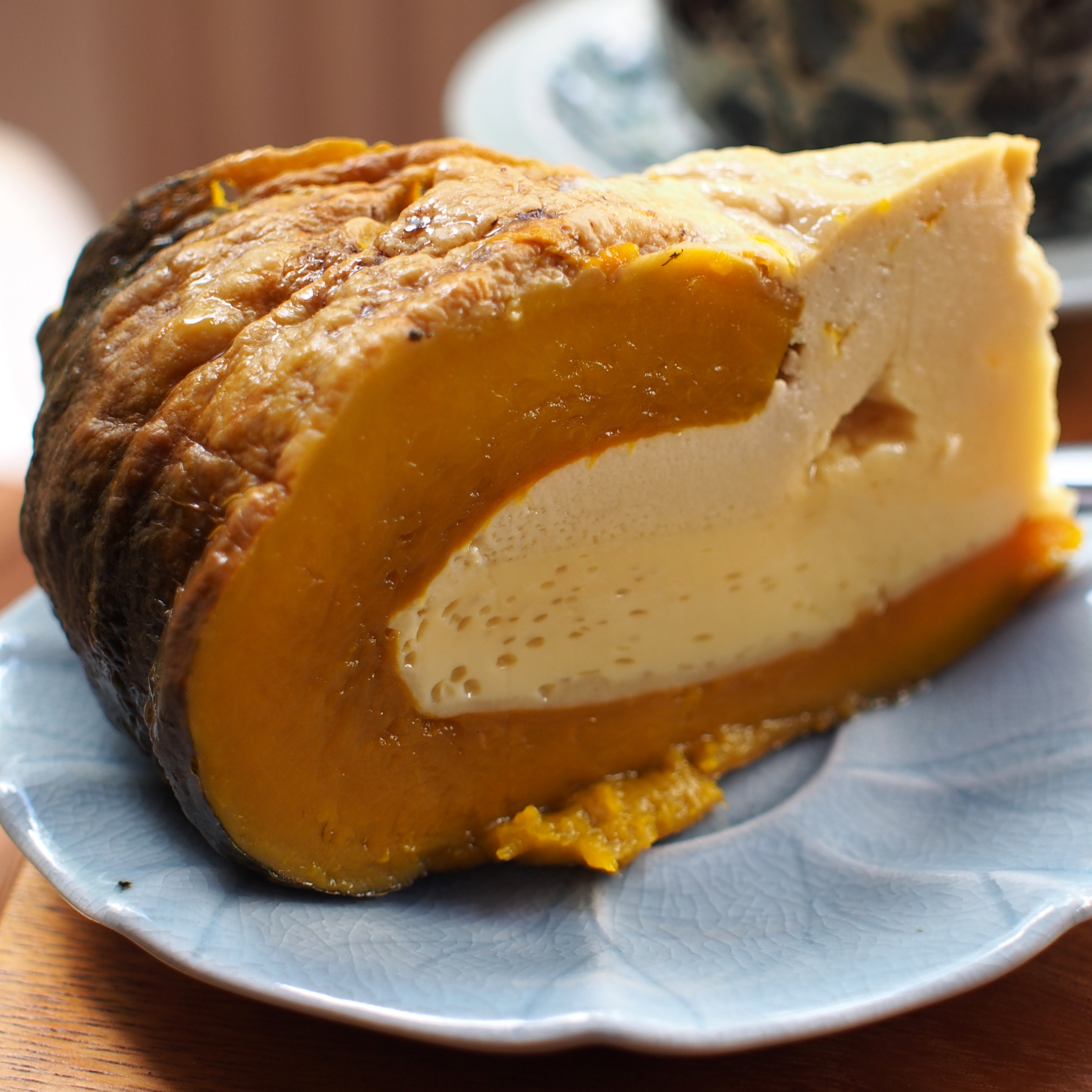
Pumpkin-coconut custard is a Southeast Asian dessert dish consisting of a coconut custard steam-baked in a pumpkin or kabocha.

This is a list of custard desserts, containing prepared desserts that use custard as an ingredient. The term custard encompasses a variety of culinary preparations based on a cooked mixture of milk or cream, and egg or egg yolk.

== Custard desserts ==
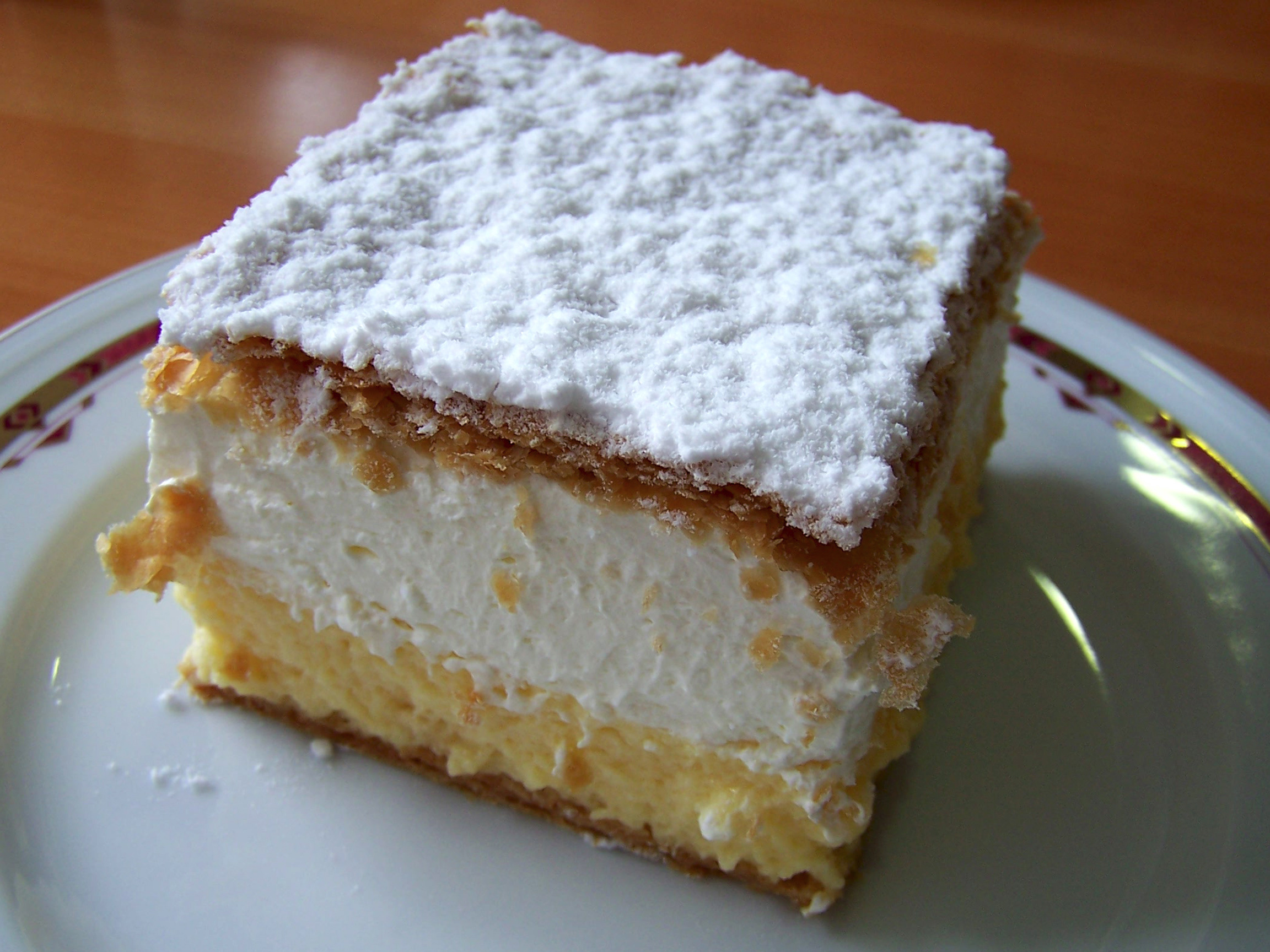
A cremeschnitte

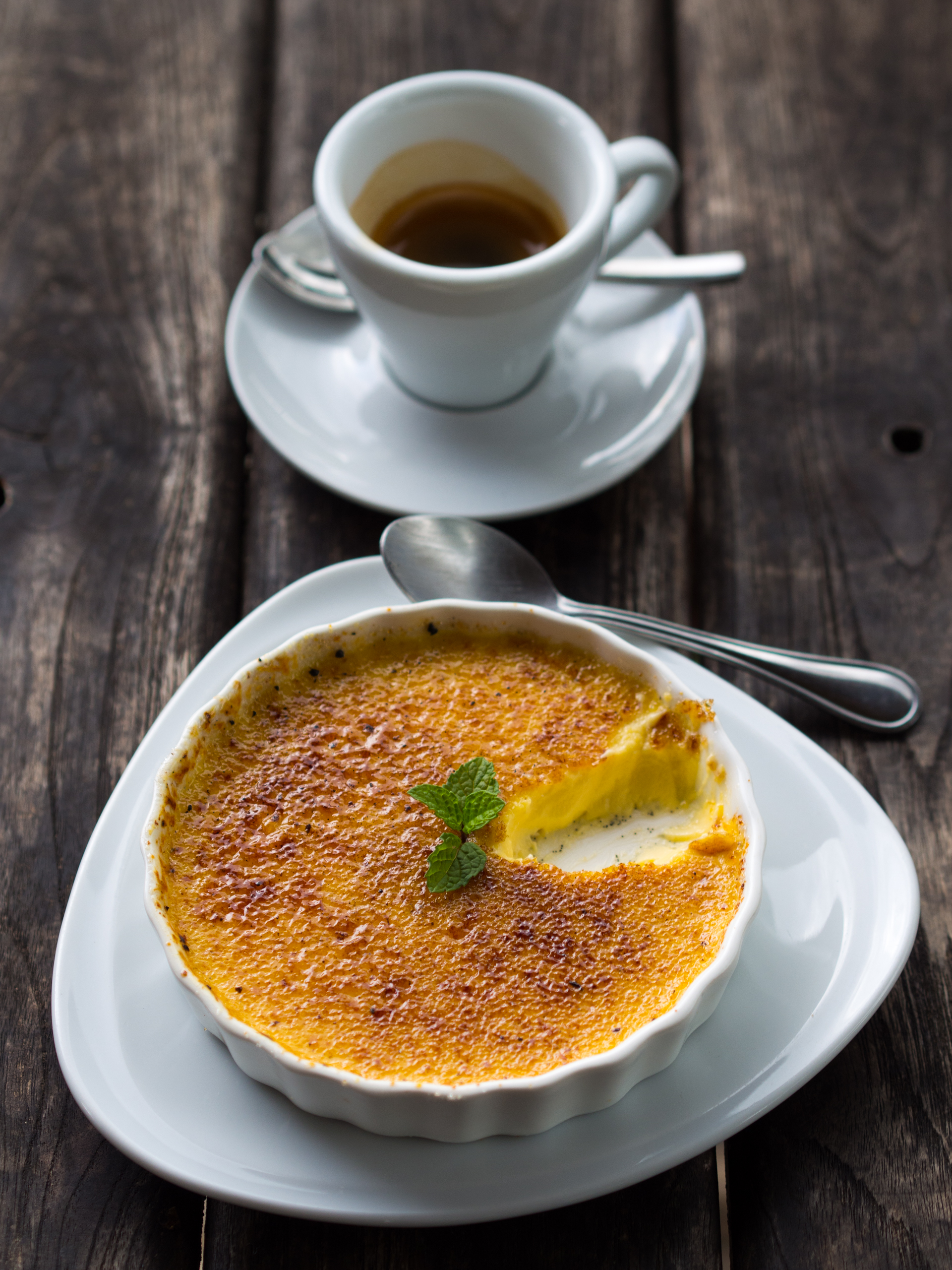
Crème brûlée with espresso

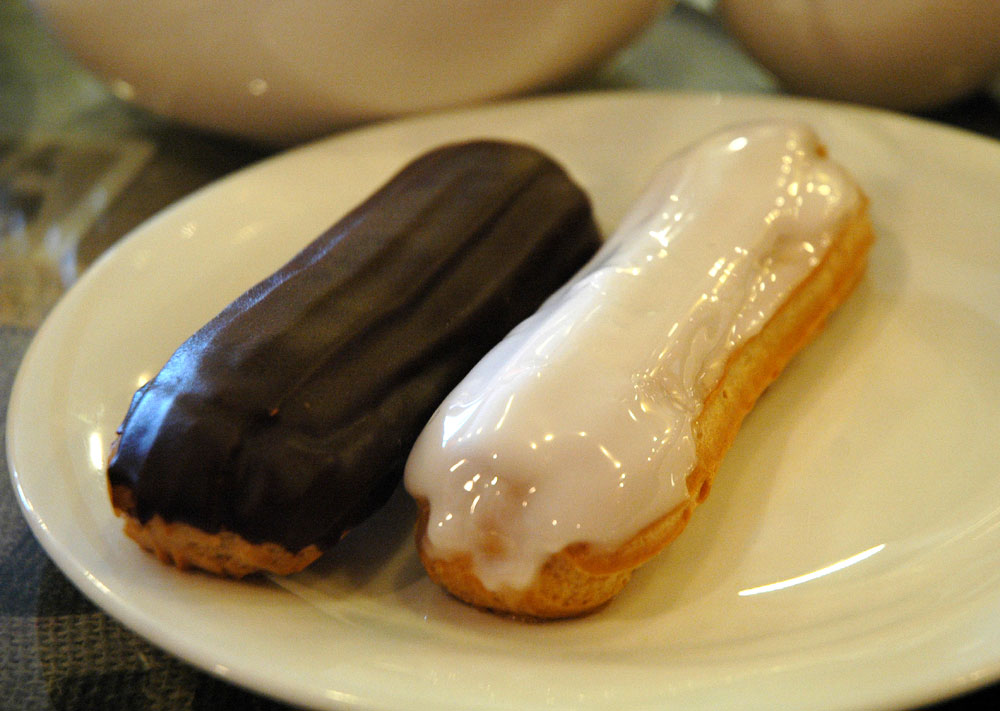
Some éclairs have a custard filling.

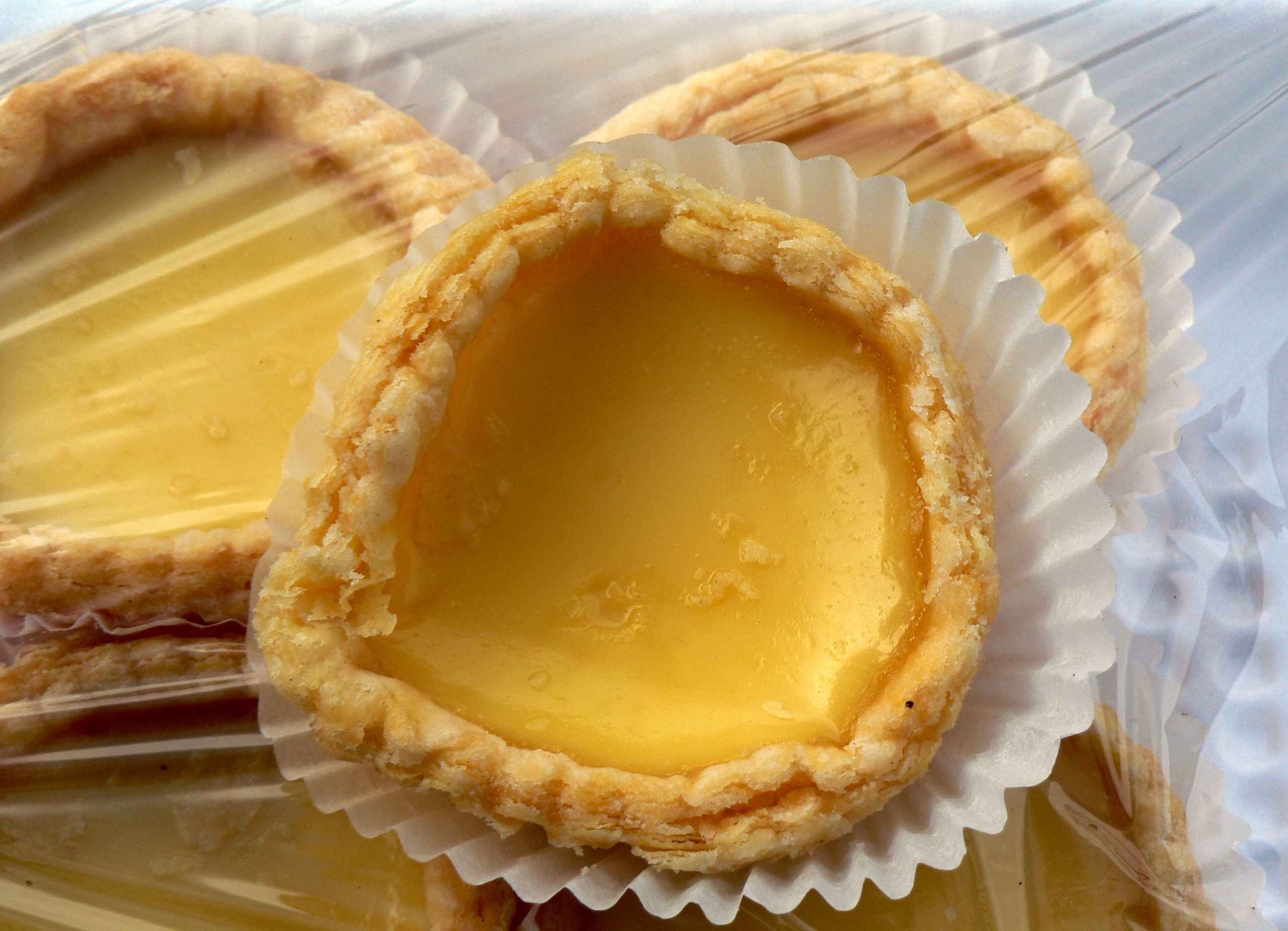
An egg custard tart

- Banana custard – Banana slices mixed with custard
- Banana pudding – Dessert made from banana
- Bavarian cream – Custard dessert
- Bean pie – Sweet custard pie
- Bienenstich – German layered yeast cake
- Bob Andy pie - a Cinnamon flavoured custard pie
- Bonèt – An Italian custard from the region of Piedmont
- Boston cream doughnut – Custard-filled sandwich cake
- Boston cream pie – Custard-filled sandwich cake
- Bougatsa – Breakfast pastry in Greece
- Brazo de Mercedes – Traditional Filipino meringue roll
- Bread and butter pudding – Traditional sweet British pudding
- Buttermilk pie – Type of desperation pie
- Charlotte – Icebox cake
- Cheesecake - baked cheesecake
- Chiboust cream – Pastry cream lightened with meringue
- Cream pie – Custard based pie
- Crema catalana – Catalan dessert similar to crème brûlée
- Crema de fruta – Filipino layer cake
- Crème anglaise – Light sweetened pouring custard
- Crème brûlée – Custard dessert with hard caramel top
- Crème caramel – Custard dessert with soft caramel on top, also known as flan, caramel custard, egg pudding or caramel pudding
- Cremeschnitte – Puff pastry dessert
- Custard pie – Pastry container with a sweet egg mixture
- Custard tart – Baked dessert consisting of an egg custard-filled pastry crust
- Éclair – Cream-filled pastry
- Egg tart – Type of tart
- Far Breton – Dessert cake from Brittany, France
- Flanby – Caramel custard dessert
- Flapper pie – Dessert in Canadian cuisine
- Floating island – Dessert of soft meringue on crème anglaise
- Frangipane – Almond custard
- Frozen custard – Frozen dessert
- Galaktoboureko – Custard-filled dessert
- Karpatka – Polish cream pie
- Kogel mogel – Egg-based homemade dessert
- Kremówka – Layered puff pastry dessert from Poland (napoleonka)
- Krofne – Balkan doughnuts
- Leche flan – Custard dessert with soft caramel on top
- Malvern pudding – Fruit and custard pudding
- Manchester tart – Custard filled tart
- Mató de Pedralbes – Catalan traditional dessert
- Melktert – South African tart
- Miguelitos – Puff pastry dessert from Spain
- Mille-feuille – French pâtisserie also known as Napoleon
- Nanaimo bar – Canadian no-bake dessert
- Natillas – Spanish custard dish of milk and eggs, variety of custards
- Normandy tart – French almond dessert
- Ozark pudding – Custard with fruit and nuts
- Pączki – Polish filled doughnuts
- Pastel de nata – Portuguese egg tart pastry dusted with cinnamon
- Pasticciotto – Type of filled Italian pastry
- Pio Quinto – Desert in Nicaragua
- Pot de crème – Dessert
- Profiterole – Cream-filled pastry
- Pumpkin pie – Dessert
- Queen of Puddings – British dessert
- Quindim – Typical Brazilian dessert
- Rožata – Custard dessert with soft caramel on top
- Salzburger Nockerl – Austrian sweet soufflé
- Semifreddo – Italian frozen dessert
- Skolebrød – Norwegian sweet roll
- Soufflé – Egg-based baked dish
- St. Honoré cake – French dessert
- Sweet potato pie – Traditional dessert in the southern United States
- Tarte à la Bouillie – Cajun custard tart
- Tipsy cake – Cake soaked in alcohol
- Tiramisu – Italian dessert
- Tompouce – Type of pastry in the Netherlands and Belgium
- Torta de nata – Colombian dessert
- Trifle – Layered fruit dessert
- Vanilla slice – Australian pastry
- Vla – Dutch dairy product
- Watalappam – Custard pudding
- Wuzetka – Polish chocolate sponge and cream pie
- Yema – Filipino candy
- Zabaione – Italian dessert, or sometimes drink
- Zeppole – Italian doughnut
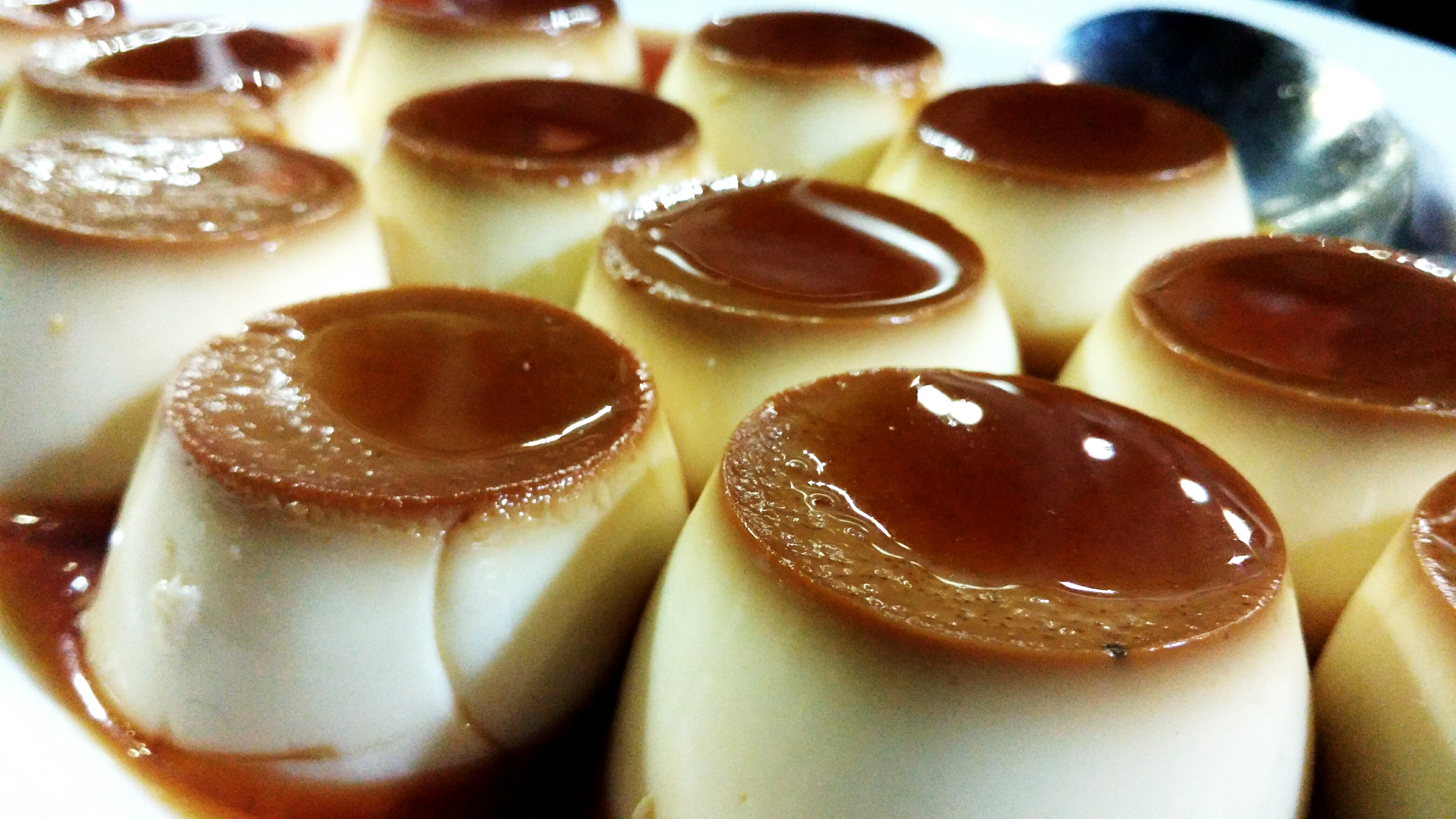
Creme caramel, also known as flan

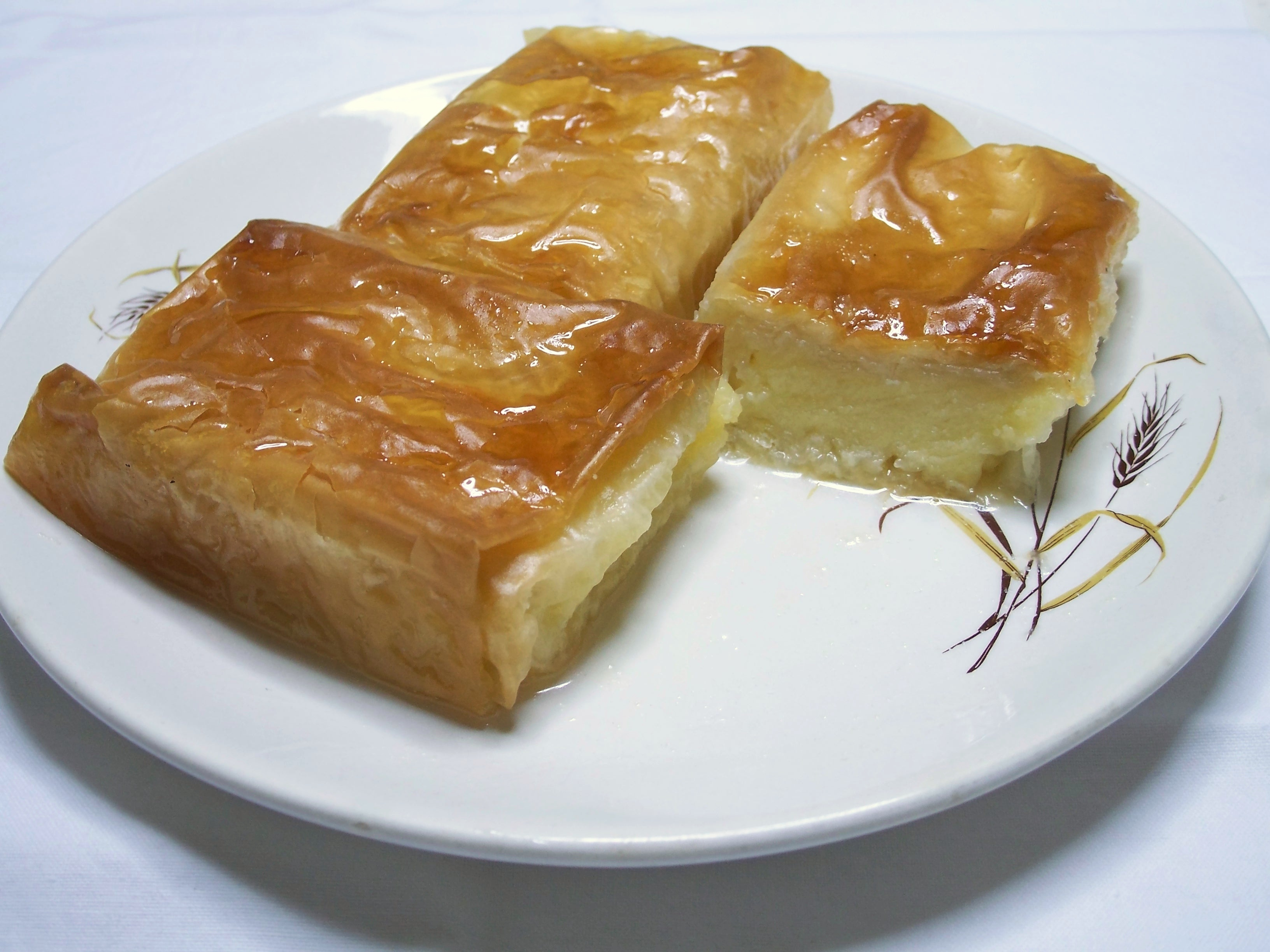
Galaktoboureko is a dessert of semolina custard in phyllo dough.

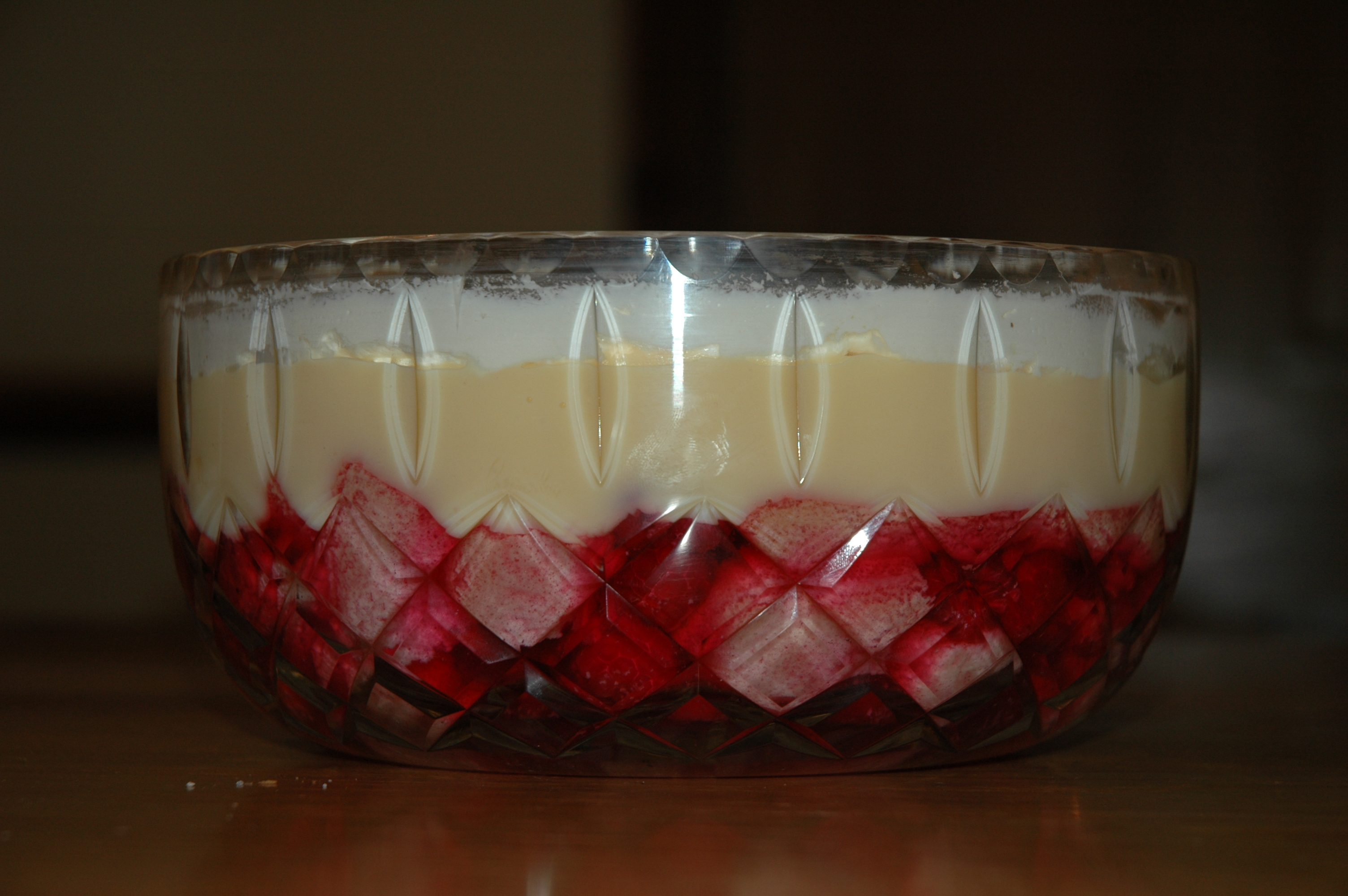
Layers of a trifle showing the custard in between cake, fruit and whipped cream

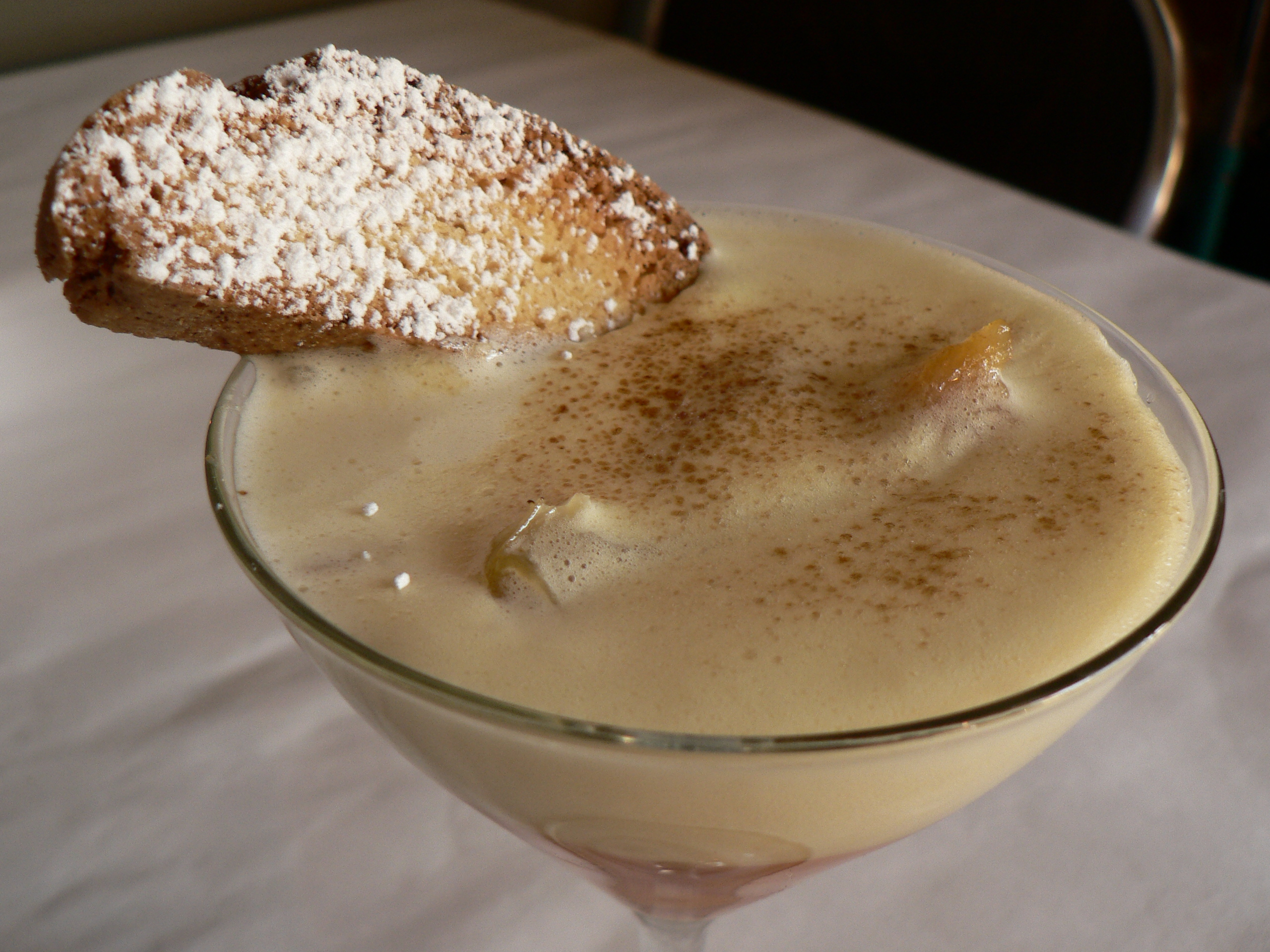
A glass of zabaione

== See also ==
- Blancmange – made without egg yolks
- Bavarian cream – made without egg yolks
- Panna cotta – made without egg yolks
- Eggnog
- Eierpunsch – sometimes prepared using custard as an ingredient
- List of baked goods
- List of desserts
- List of egg dishes
- Lists of prepared foods
- List of savoury puddings
- List of sweet puddings
