= Milk pie =

Indonesian traditional pie

Pie susu
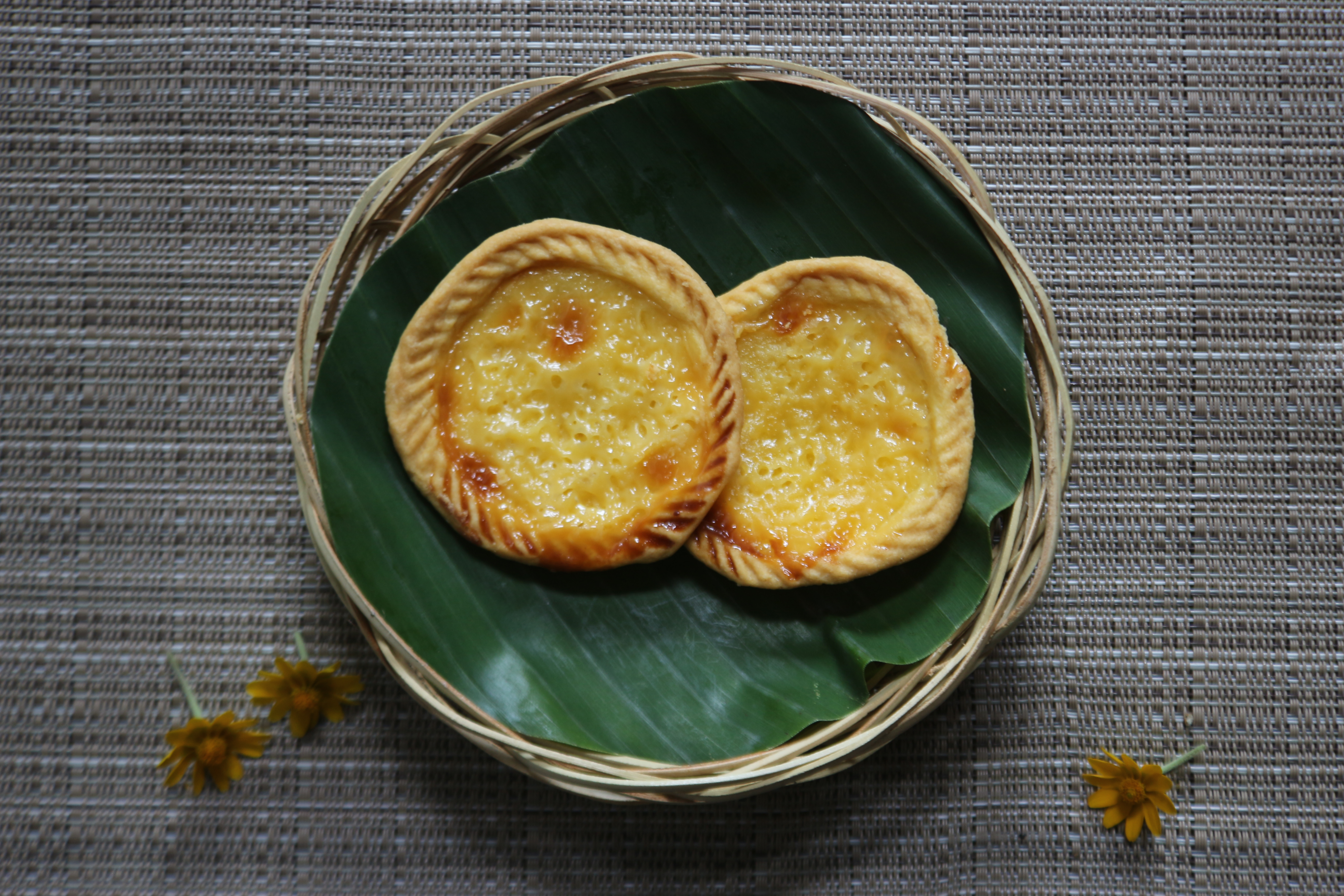
- Pie susu in Bali
- Alternative names: Pai susu (Indonesian)
- Type: Pastry, kue
- Course: Dessert, snack
- Place of origin: Indonesia
- Region or state: Nationwide
- Created by: Balinese
- Main ingredients: Pastry crust, egg custard
- Variations: pasta de nata
- Food energy (per serving): 29 kcal (120 kJ)
- Other information: contains egg yolk and heavy cream

Milk pie or pie susu (Indonesian: pai susu, lit. 'milk pie') is an Indonesian custard tart pastry consisting of a shortcrust pastry filled with egg custard and condensed milk. This traditional Indonesian dessert pastry is very flat with only one very thin layer of custard. The origin of this pastry is from Bali.

Pie susu is a unique pastry, although the shape is similar to Portuguese pastel de nata.

== See also ==
- Indonesian cuisine
- Kue
- List of Indonesian dishes
- Pie
- Melktert
