= Tarte à la Bouillie =

Cajun custard tart

Tarte à la bouillie are sweet-dough custard tarts. They are part of Cajun cuisine.

== See also ==
- List of custard desserts
