= Flan (British cuisine) =

British tart with egg-based filling

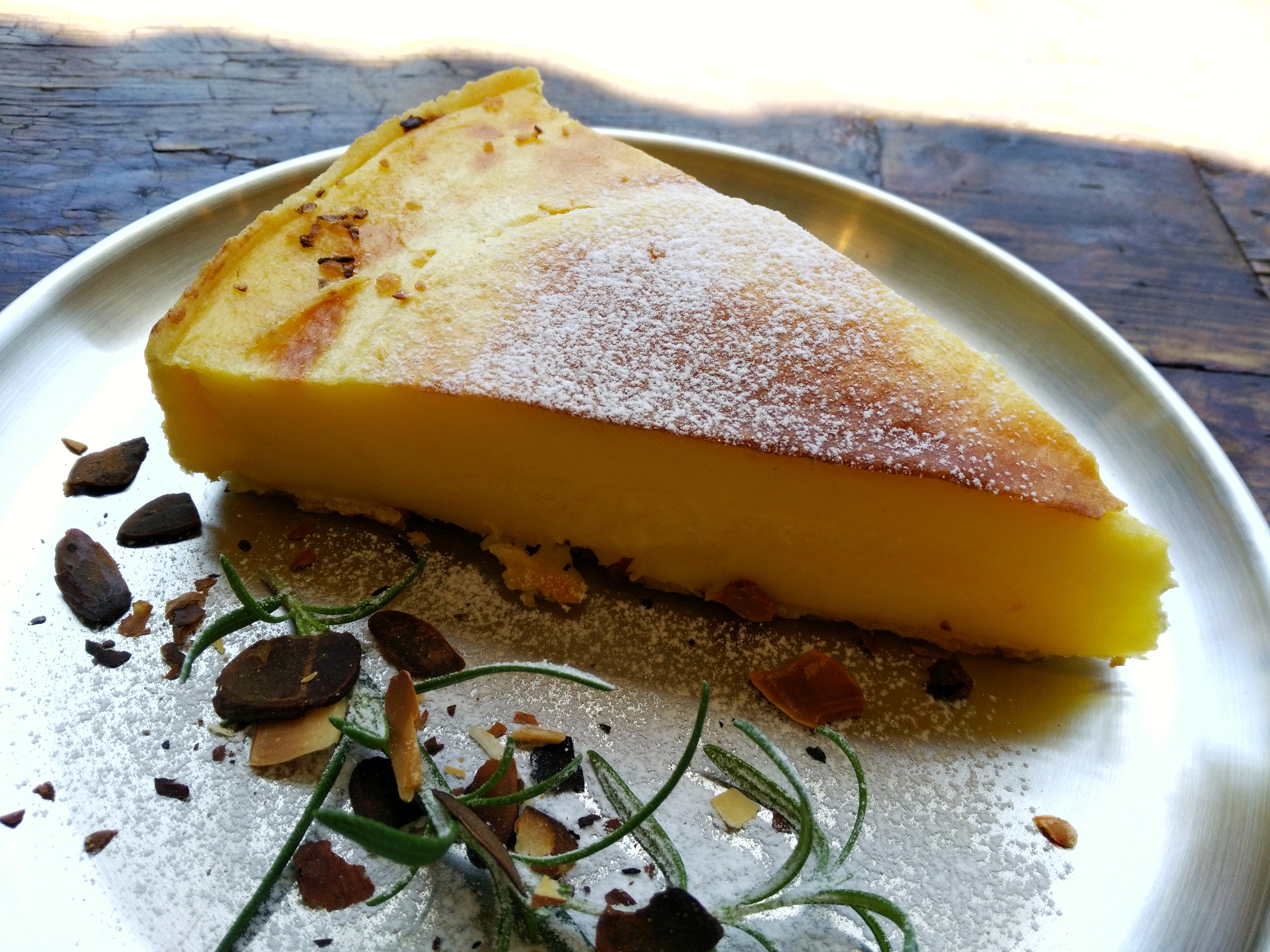
- A slice of flan on a plate
- Type: Dessert or snack
- Place of origin: Ancient Rome
- Region or state: Global
- Associated cuisine: Roman cuisine
- Serving temperature: Room temperature or cold

A flan, in British cuisine, is an egg-based dish with an open, rimmed pastry or sponge base containing a sweet or savoury filling. Examples are bacon and egg flan (quiche Lorraine) and custard tart.

In Ancient Rome, flan was often a savory dish, as in "eel flan"; sweet flans were also enjoyed. In the Middle Ages, both sweet and savory flans (almonds, cinnamon and sugar; cheese, curd, spinach, fish) were popular in Spain and across Europe, especially during Lent, when meat was forbidden.

The English word "flan", and the earlier forms "flaune" and "flawn", come from the Old French flaon (modern French flan), in turn from the early Medieval Latin fladō (accusative fladōnem), of Germanic origin, from an Indo-European root meaning "flat" or "broad".

== See also ==
- Custard pie
- Egg tart
- Flan cake
- Flaó
- List of pies, tarts and flans
- Quiche
- Eierschecke, a German dish from Saxony and Thuringia
