= Watalappam =

Custard pudding

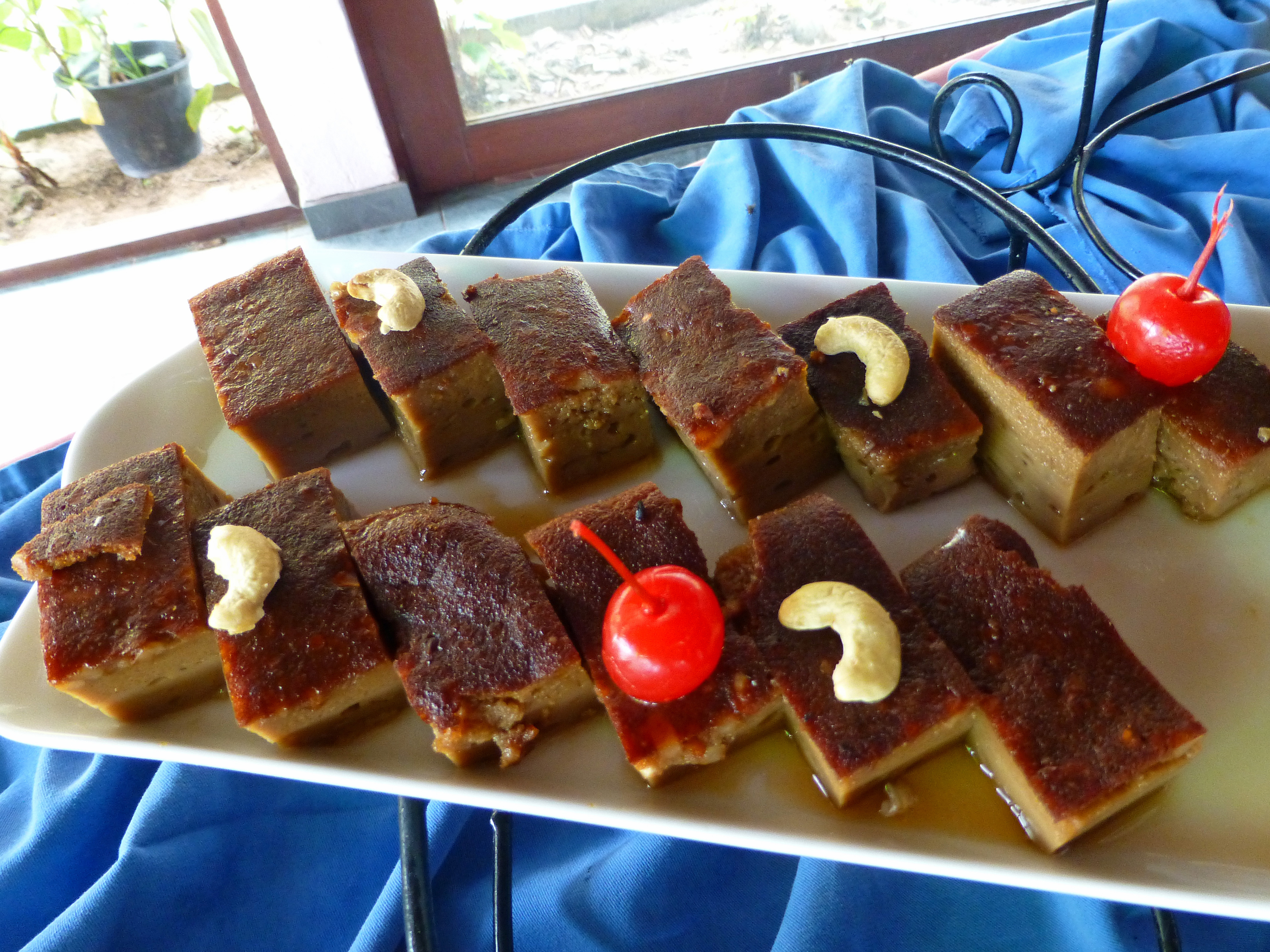
- Alternative names: Vattalappam
- Type: Pudding
- Course: Dessert
- Place of origin: Sri Lanka
- Main ingredients: Coconut or Condensed cow's milk, jaggery, cashew nuts, eggs, cardamom, cloves, nutmeg, other spices

Watalappam (also called watalappan or vattilappam) (Sinhala: වටලප්පන්, Tamil: வட்டிலப்பம், Sri Lankan Malay: serikaya) is a Sri Lankan coconut custard pudding made of coconut milk or condensed milk, jaggery, cashew nuts, eggs, various spices, including cardamom, cloves, and nutmeg, and sometimes thick pandan juice or grated vanilla pods.

The dish is believed to have been brought to the country by Sri Lankan Malays in the 18th century, who moved from Indonesia to the country during Dutch rule. The name, watalappam, could be a corruption of the Tamil words vattil (cup) and appam (cake), hence vatillappam (cup cake). The dish however was originally unknown to the Tamil population. It is more likely that the dessert is derived from a Malay dish known as serikaya, which is a steamed custard made from eggs, coconut milk, palm sugar and pandan or screwpine leaves. The similarity between the two dishes suggests a common origin. It is likely that it is a word borrowed from the Dutch, Vla, which means a custard, and was applied by the Moors as a vernacular name, vattil-appan, using the Tamil phrasing.

The dessert has come to be strongly identified with Sri Lanka's Muslim community and is a part of a traditional Eid al-Fitr celebrations, marking the end of Ramadan. It is also popular during weddings, religious festivals and other social functions and celebrations.

== See also ==
- Cuisine of Sri Lanka
- List of custard desserts
