= Flanby =

Caramel custard dessert

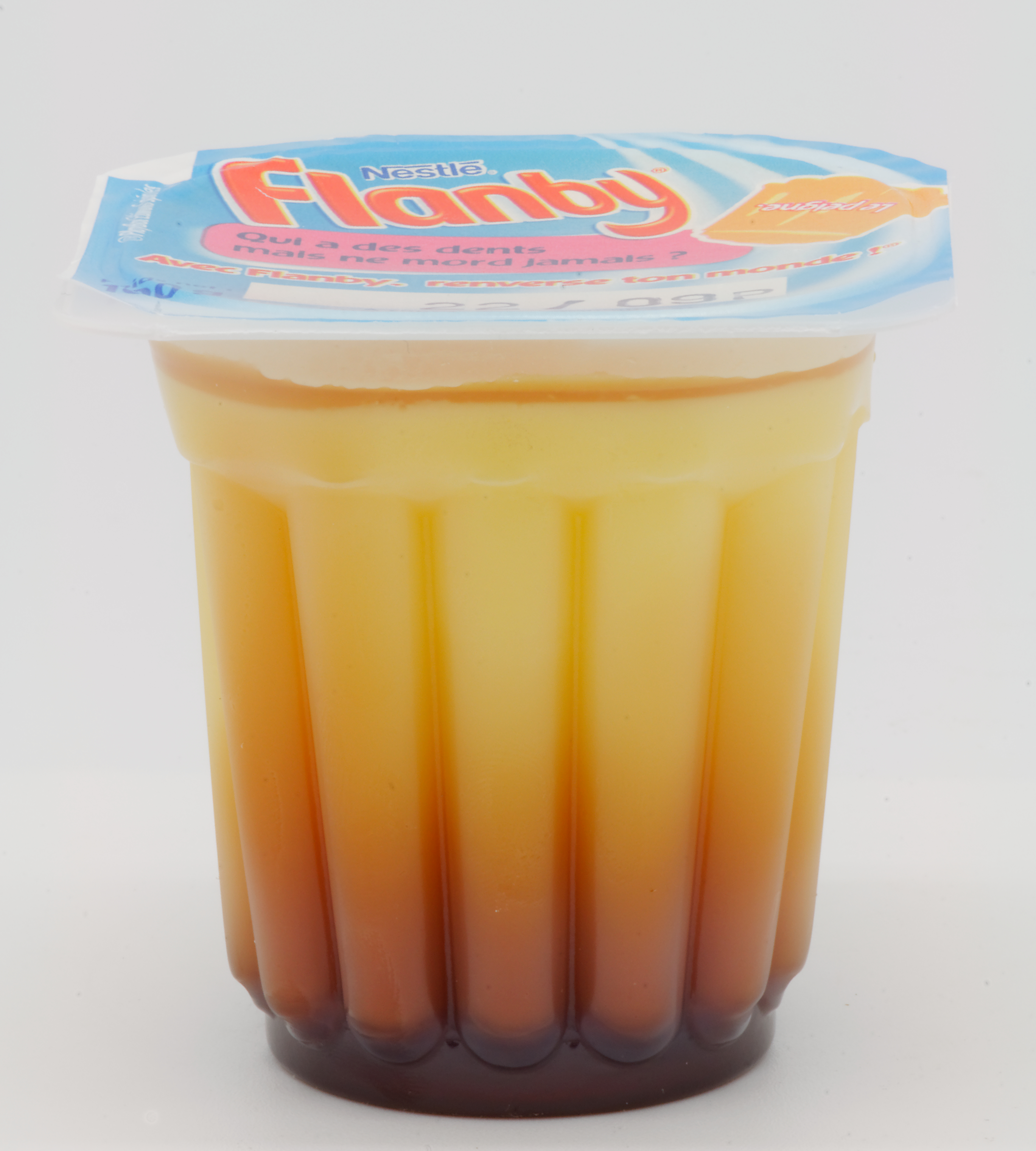
- Type: Custard
- Place of origin: France

Flanby (often misspelled "Flamby") is a French caramel custard (Crème caramel) marketed by Lactalis Nestlé Produits Frais, a joint venture between Nestlé and Lactalis agribusiness, sold in plastic pots. It is described as a wobbly pudding with a soft center.

Former French President François Hollande is pejoratively nicknamed Flanby.

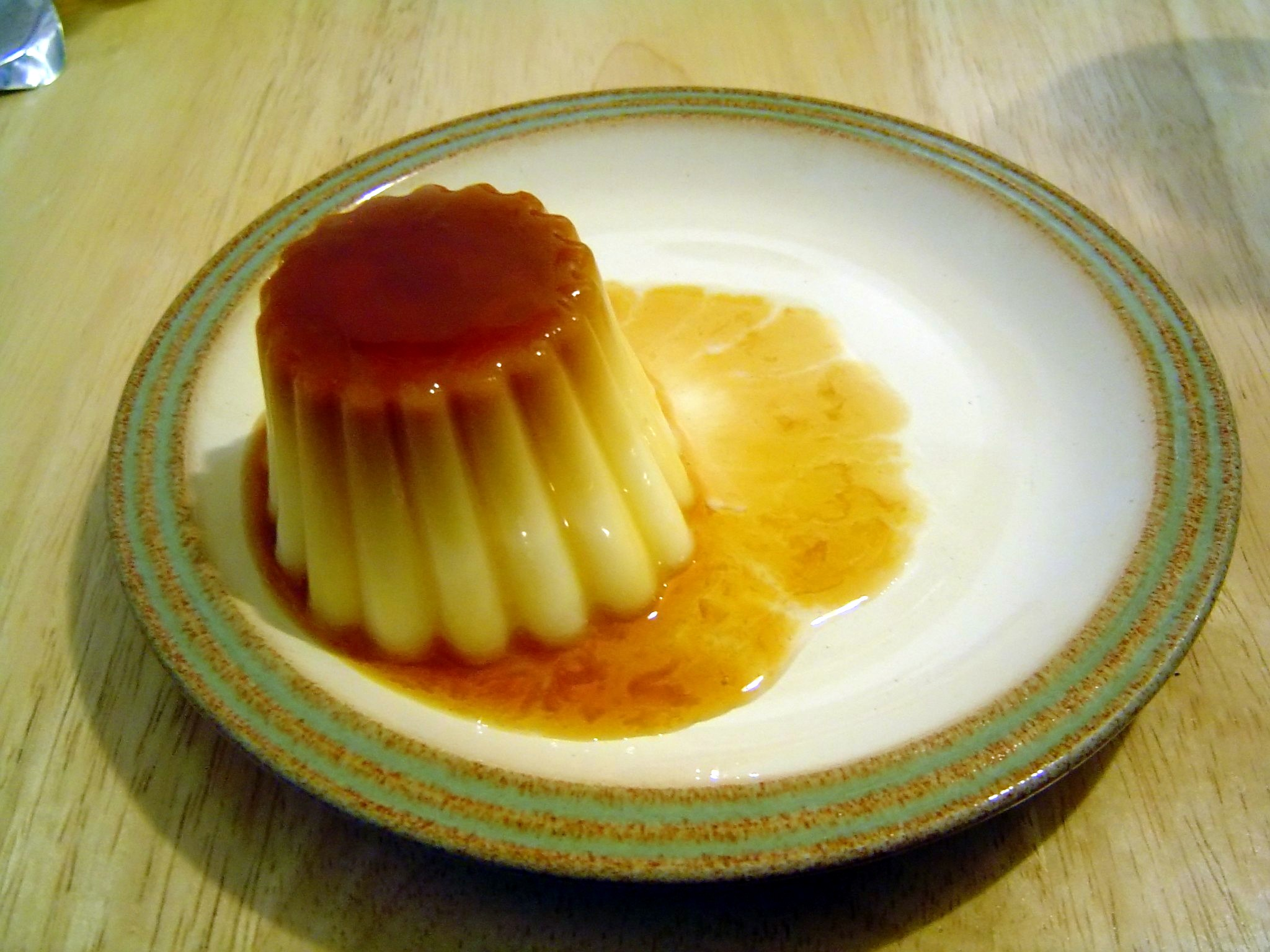
Flanby removed from the pot

== See also ==
- List of custard desserts
