= Bottle scraper =

Dutch kitchen tool

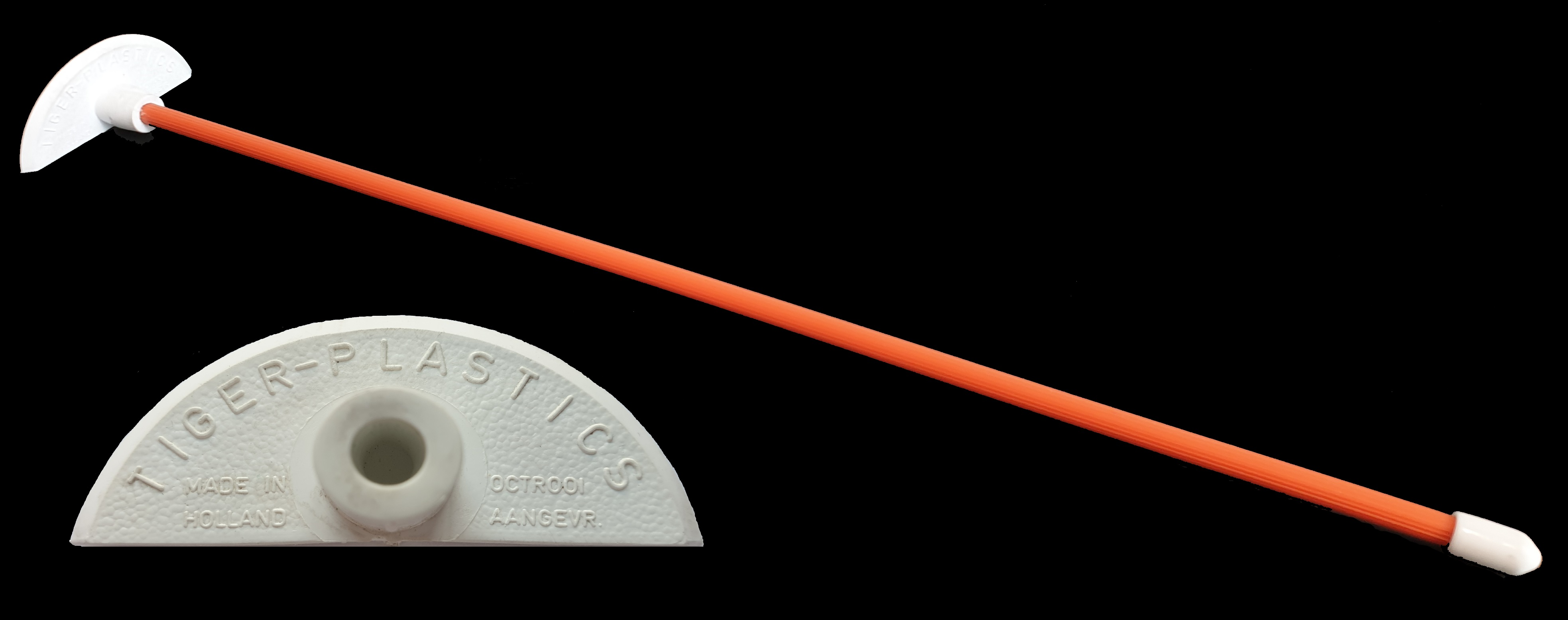
Dutch bottle scraper and head

The bottle scraper (known as both a flessenschraper (bottle scraper) and flessenlikker (bottle licker) in Dutch) is a Dutch kitchen tool similar to a small spatula. It is designed to scrape the contents of long bottles that would be impossible to reach with other kitchen tools. Although the tool is sold in Norway and has even been described in some accounts as having originated there, it was introduced in the Netherlands around 1954 by a Dutch family-owned company Tijger Plastics NV founded in 1950 and nowadays operating as Coram NV. The bottle scraper was patented on 31 March 1967 and it is cited as a quintessentially Dutch tool as well as an example of Dutch thrift.

The scraper is made of a long shaft, frequently around 30 centimetres (0.98 ft) in length. On one side is a small flexible rubber spatula head roughly 4 centimetres (1.6 in) across set perpendicular to the shaft. The head is flexible and usually has a rounded half-circle shape one side useful for scraping round bottles and jars and a flat side with two right angles useful for scraping out cartons. The head is flexible so that it can be pushed into and pulled out of bottles whose mouth is smaller than the fully expanded head of the scraper but larger than the shaft.

It is a common tool in kitchens in the Netherlands and available in many kitchen stores and supermarkets — although this may vary by region. It is almost entirely unused and unknown outside of that country.

Historically, vla (a popular dairy product with the consistency similar to custard or yoghurt) was sold in long glass bottles. Vla was frequently delivered by milkmen in bottles similar to the long, tapered-neck milk bottles used in many places in the world. However, while the use of the milk bottle streamlined production and distribution practices, the shape of the container made it hard to extract the last bits with spoons, spatulas, or other kitchen utensils. The Dutch solution was the bottle scraper, which was perfectly suited to fix this problem.

Vla is now primarily sold in cartons which reduces the need for a bottle scraper or make the design less efficient (e.g., bottles have rounded walls while cartons frequently have square bases with 90 degree angles). Modern bottle scrapers include a spatula-side with right angles useful for scraping vla out of these containers as well. Additionally, the scraper has come to occupy an important role in Dutch kitchens in variety of other purposes being used for scraping the contents of many other bottles and jars (for example, nut butters and other spreads). Much of the Dutch population is familiar with the bottle scraper and skilled in its use.
