= Manchester tart =

Custard filled tart

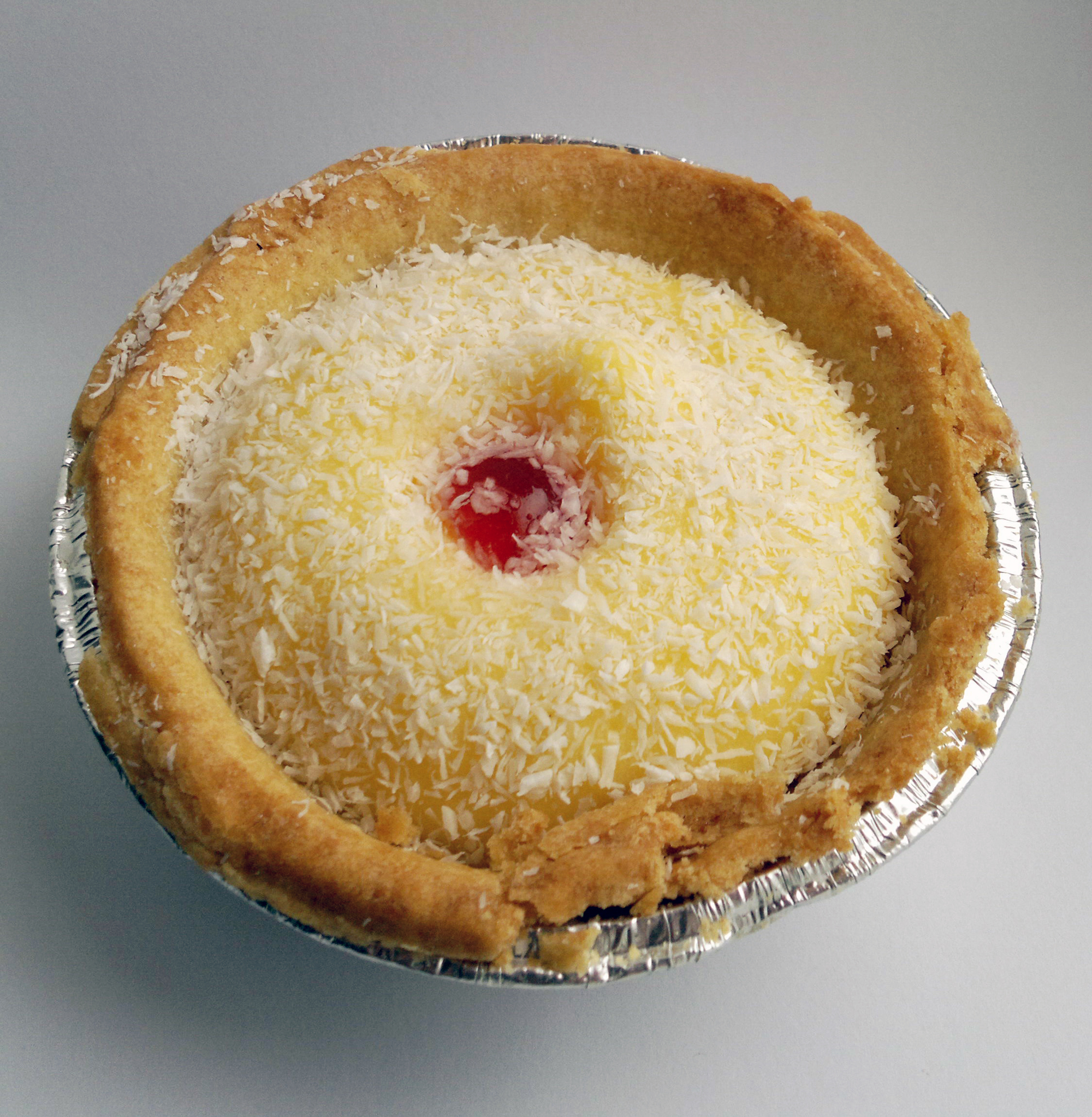
- A Manchester tart
- Type: Tart
- Place of origin: England
- Region or state: Manchester
- Created by: Mrs Beeton
- Main ingredients: Shortcrust pastry, raspberry jam, custard, flaked coconut, maraschino cherry
- Variations: Lemon-flavoured custard

Manchester tart is a traditional English baked tart consisting of a shortcrust pastry shell spread with raspberry jam, covered with a custard filling and topped with flakes of coconut and a maraschino cherry. A common variation has a layer of thinly sliced bananas under the custard.

== History ==
The recipe for Manchester tart was first published in Mrs. Beeton's Book of Household Management (1861) by the English journalist, editor and writer Isabella Beeton under the name Manchester Pudding. The recipe consisted of puff pastry with a layer of jam and custard poured on top, topped with a sprinkling of sugar.

By the 1970s and 1980s, Manchester tart was regularly served as a dessert in UK school canteens. The tarts usually contained coconut and a cherry, and sometimes also a layer of chopped banana between the custard and the jam.

== See also ==
- Custard tart
- List of custard desserts
- List of pies, tarts and flans
