= Chocolate tart =

Dark chocolate dessert

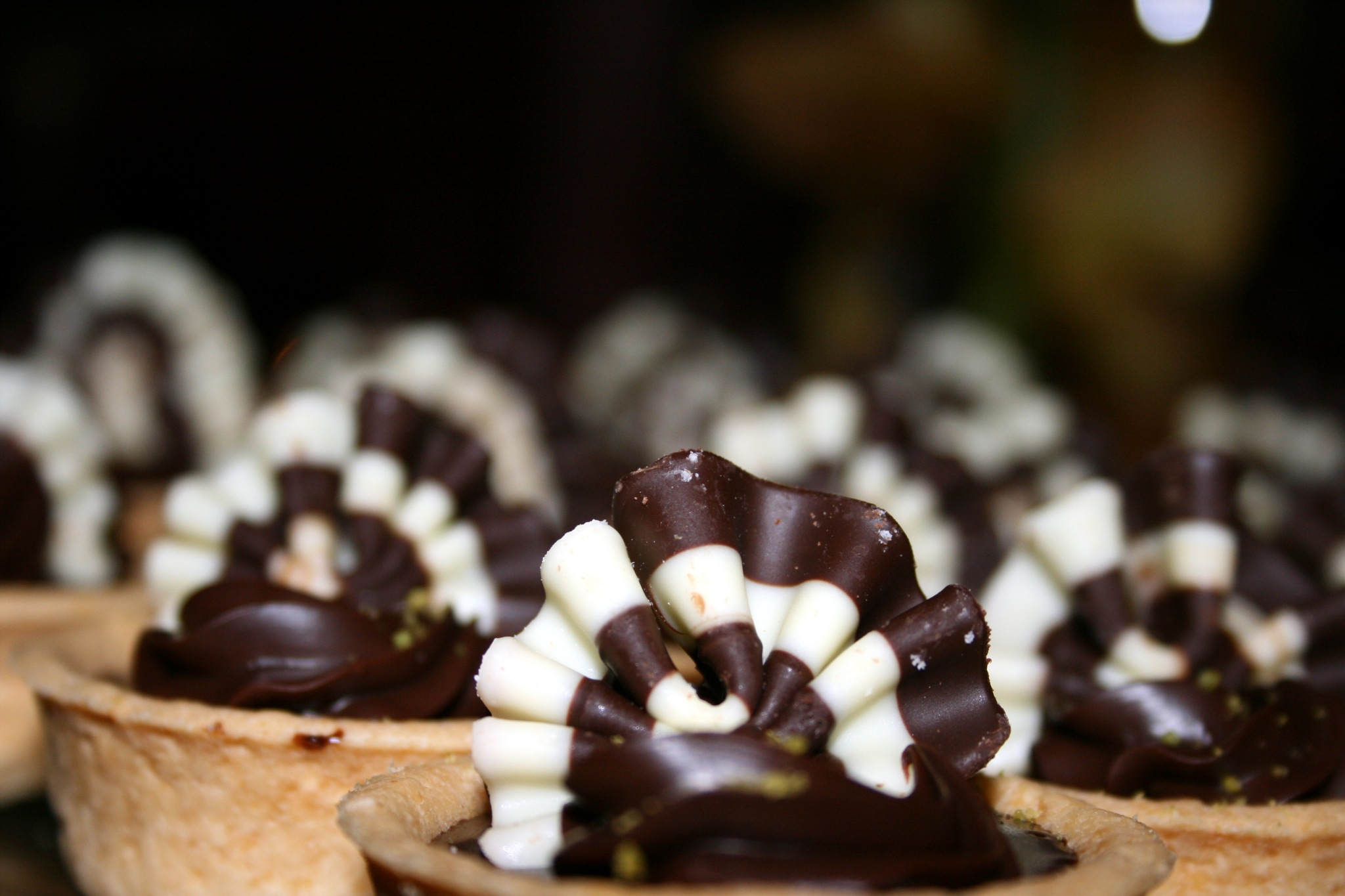
- Alternative names: Chocolate cream pie
- Type: Tart
- Main ingredients: Shortcrust pastry, dark chocolate, cream and eggs
- Variations: Some versions may call for pâte sablée but most merely call for a sweetened egg pastry. It should not be made with puff pastry

Chocolate tart, also known as chocolate cream pie, is a dessert consisting of dark chocolate, cream and eggs, beaten together, poured into a crisp, sweetened pastry shell and baked until firm. It is considered a form of custard tart because it includes an egg-based filling. The dish is similar in composition to chocolate mousse, however, being baked gives the chocolate tart a firmer texture.

An early recipe for a chocolate tart, similar to the modern pastry, was given by the British culinary author John Nott in his 1723 cookbook The Cooks and Confectioners Dictionary.

Due to the cost of the ingredients and difficulty of making the pastry, the dish was, until recently (2016), relatively rare except in upscale cafés. It has many variants, and is considered a gourmet dessert. An early 19th century book for "opulent families" featured a chocolate tart recipe that included cinnamon and lemon peel, taken from a 1770 book.

In Australia the chocolate tart came to national attention after being featured on the first series of MasterChef Australia in 2009. Subsequently, billed as "Australia's most famous dessert", a chocolate tart recipe became one of the deciding factors in determining the winner of the series final, although the recipe had been simplified from the original for the show. The dessert has also featured on British TV series The Naked Chef, in which Jamie Oliver cooked a chocolate tart for a romantic meal with his girlfriend (and future wife).

== Gallery ==
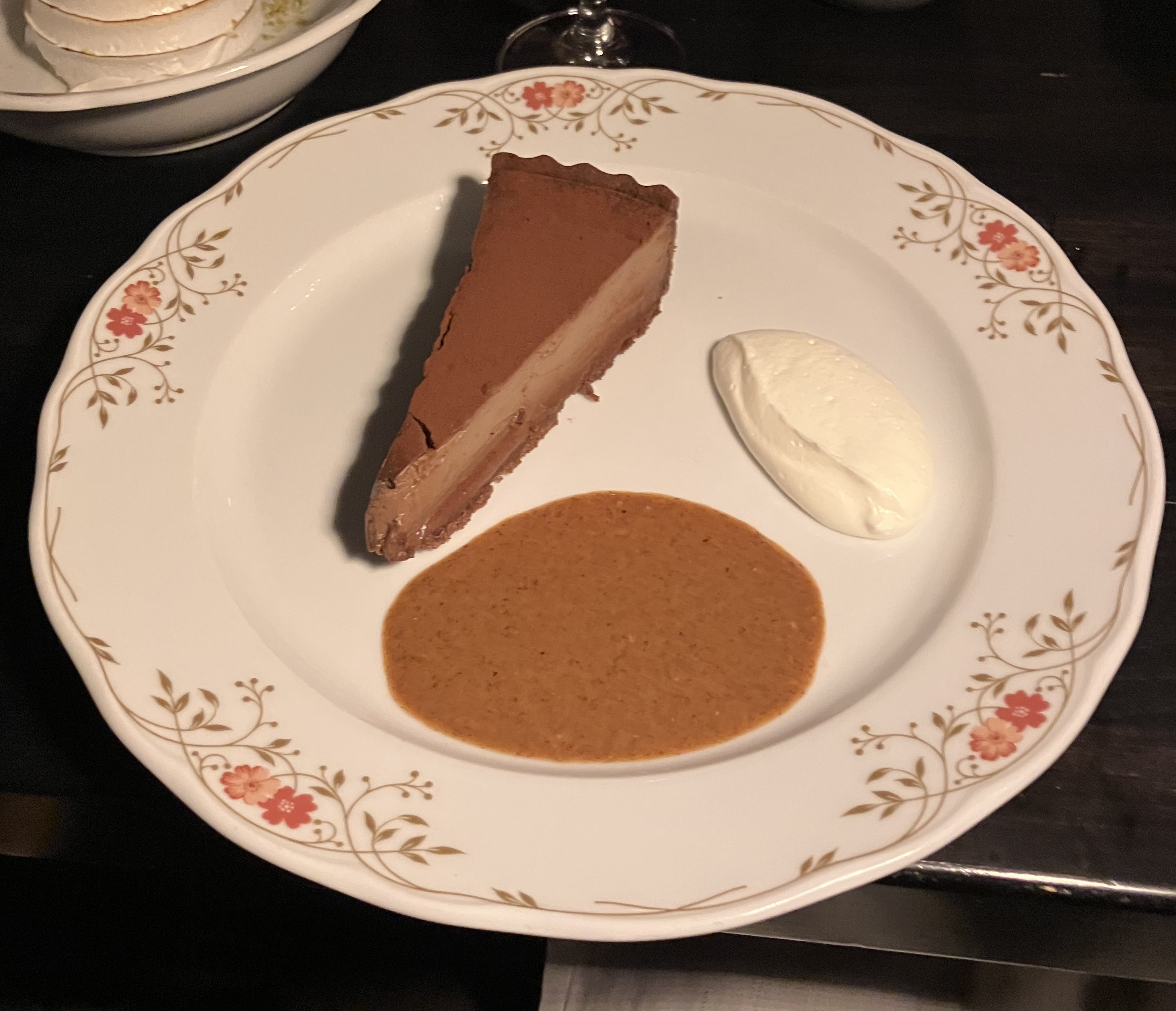
A dark chocolate tart with caramel.

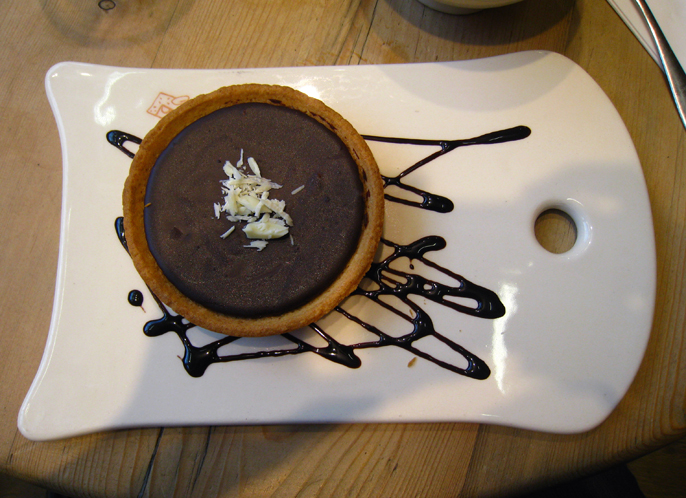
An espresso chocolate tart with chocolate sauce

== See also ==
- List of desserts
