= Vla =

Dutch dairy product

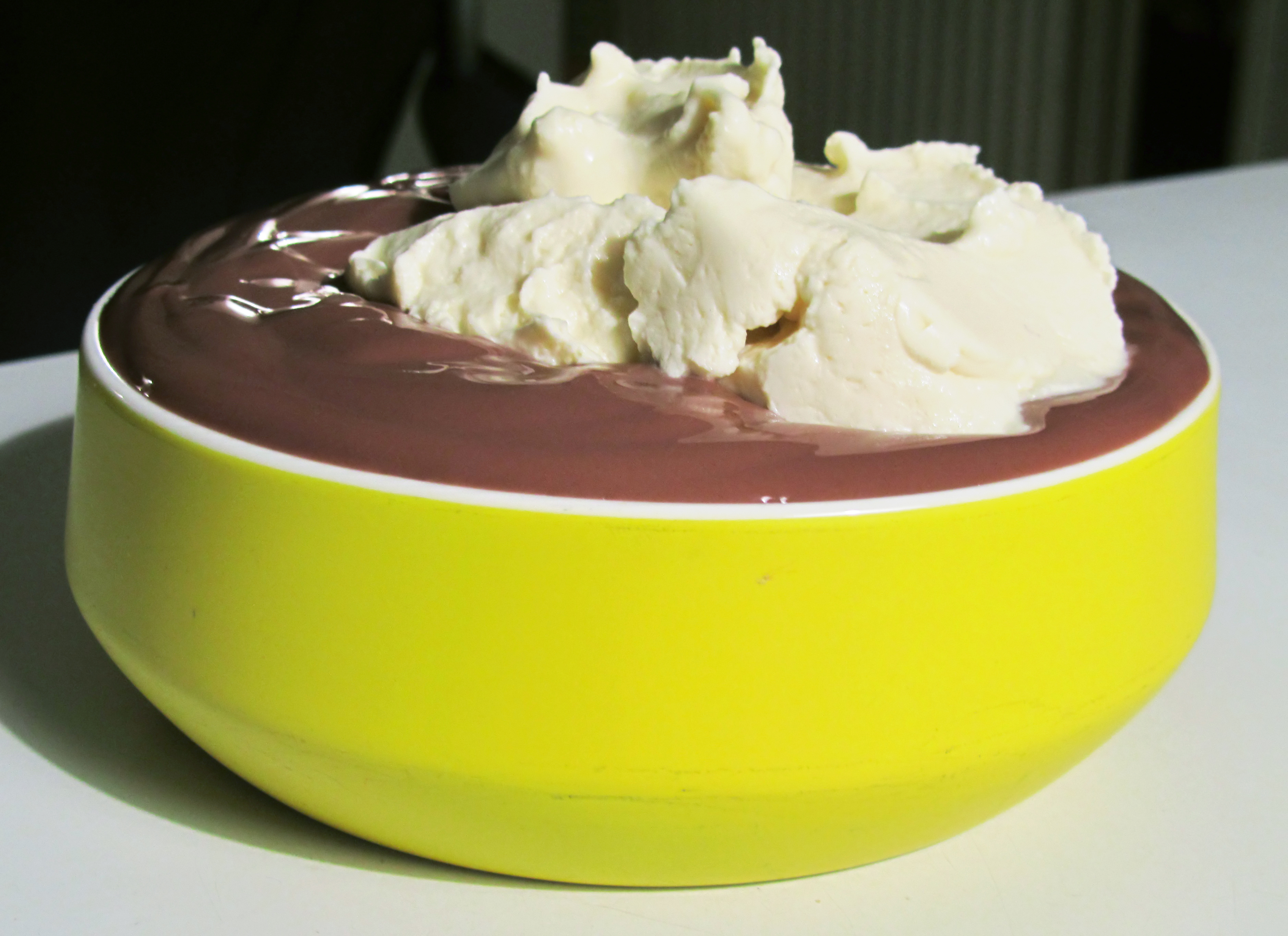
- A bowl of chocoladevla topped with whipped cream.
- Type: Vla
- Place of origin: Netherlands
- Main ingredients: Milk, eggs, cornstarch, vanilla, sugar

Vla is a Dutch dairy product made from fresh milk.

The word vla was first documented in the 13th century and originally referred to any custard-like substance covering cakes or other baked goods. The word vlaai is related and has since come to refer to a type of pie.

Traditionally vla is made with eggs, sugar and fresh milk, although some industrial producers use cornstarch rather than eggs today. Vla is available in many different flavors, of which vanilla is most popular. Other flavors include chocolate, caramel, banana, and coffee-caramel ('hopjes').

Vla was originally sold in glass bottles and the consistency made extracting the complete amount difficult, so a special bottle scraper (flessenschraper or flessenlikker) was specifically designed. Despite the fact that vla is now normally sold in cartons, these scrapers are still common in Dutch family kitchens.

Although vla is originally a typical Dutch product, it was introduced to Wallonia and Germany by Campina in 2010 and has been sold in some stores there since then.

Vla has also spread to Indonesia where it is a popular topping for puddings and other desserts.

== See also ==
- List of custard desserts
