= Egg tart =

Type of tart

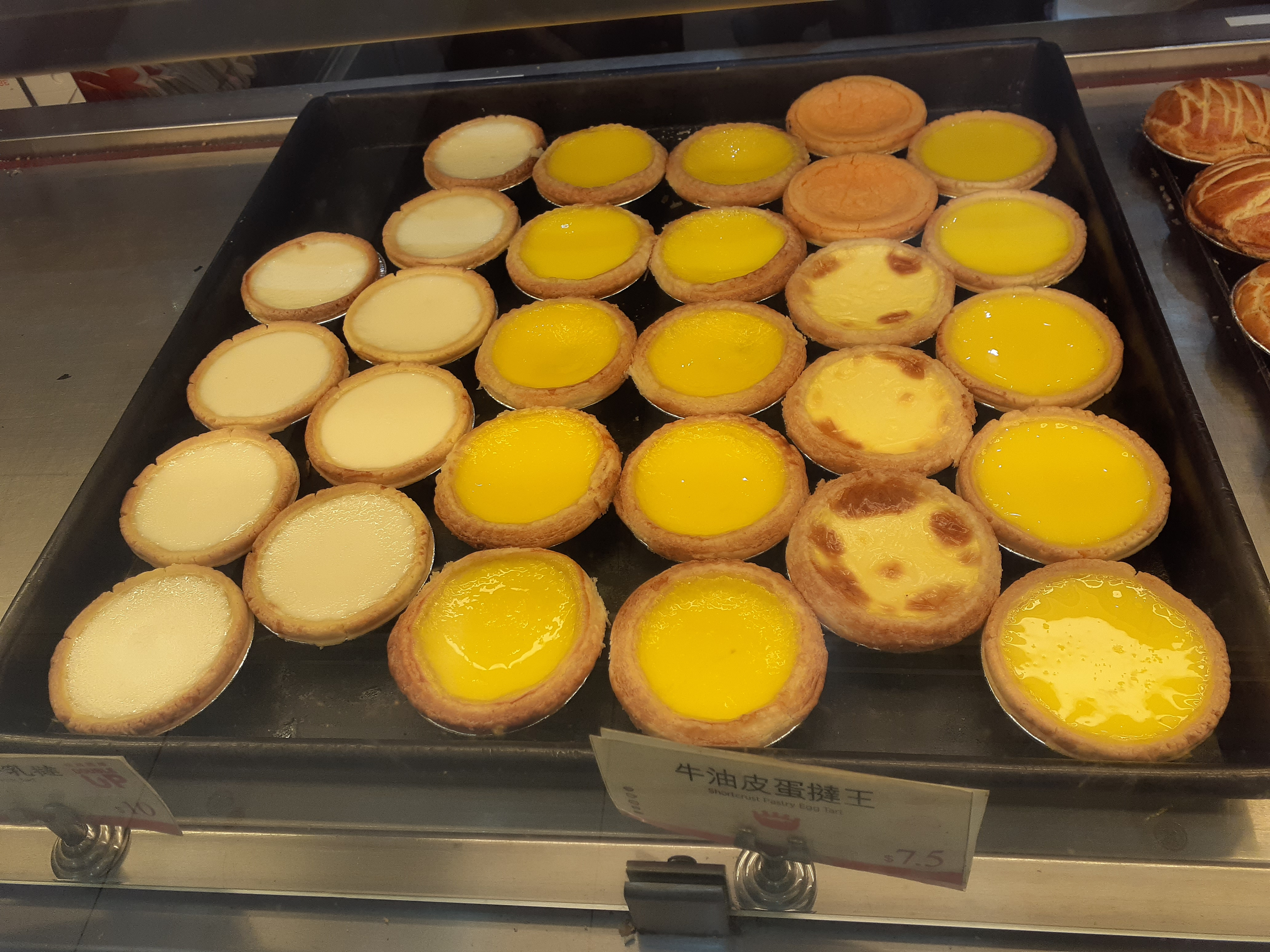
- Different variations of egg tarts
- Type: Tart
- Course: Snack
- Place of origin: Guangzhou, China
- Main ingredients: Flour, butter, sugar, egg, custard, milk

Chinese name
- Traditional Chinese: 蛋撻
- Simplified Chinese: 蛋挞
- Cantonese Yale: daahn tāat
- Literal meaning: egg tart
Transcriptions
Standard Mandarin
- Hanyu Pinyin: dàntǎ
Yue: Cantonese
- Yale Romanization: daahn tāat
- Jyutping: daan^{6} taat^{1}
- IPA: [tàːntʰáːt]

The egg tart (traditional Chinese: 蛋撻; simplified Chinese: 蛋挞; Cantonese Yale: daahn tāat; pinyin: dàntǎ) is a kind of tart found in Cantonese cuisine, derived from the English custard tart and Portuguese pastel de nata. The dish consists of an outer pastry crust filled with egg custard. Egg tarts are often served at dim sum restaurants, Chinese bakeries and cha chaan tengs (Hong Kong–style cafes).

== History ==
The egg tart started being sold in the early 20th century in Guangzhou (Canton), Guangdong province, inspired by the English custard tarts. Guangzhou's status as the only port accessible to European foreign traders led to the development of Cantonese cuisine, which had many outside influences. As Guangzhou's economy grew from trade and interaction with European powers, pastry chefs at the Western-style department stores in the city were "pressured to come up with new and exciting items to attract customers". So egg tart varieties, inspired by the custard tart from England, featuring a lard-based puff pastry crust and a filling similar to steamed egg pudding (燉蛋), were then created by department stores and appeared as a "Weekly Special". Nowadays, there are two main varieties of egg tart in China. The one that appeared around 1927 in Guangzhou's Zhen Guang Restaurant (真光酒樓) is close to the egg tarts popular in Guangzhou and Hong Kong today. The other variety is from Macau and is a take on the pastel de nata, as Macau was then a Portuguese colony.

== Variations ==
=== Hong Kong ===
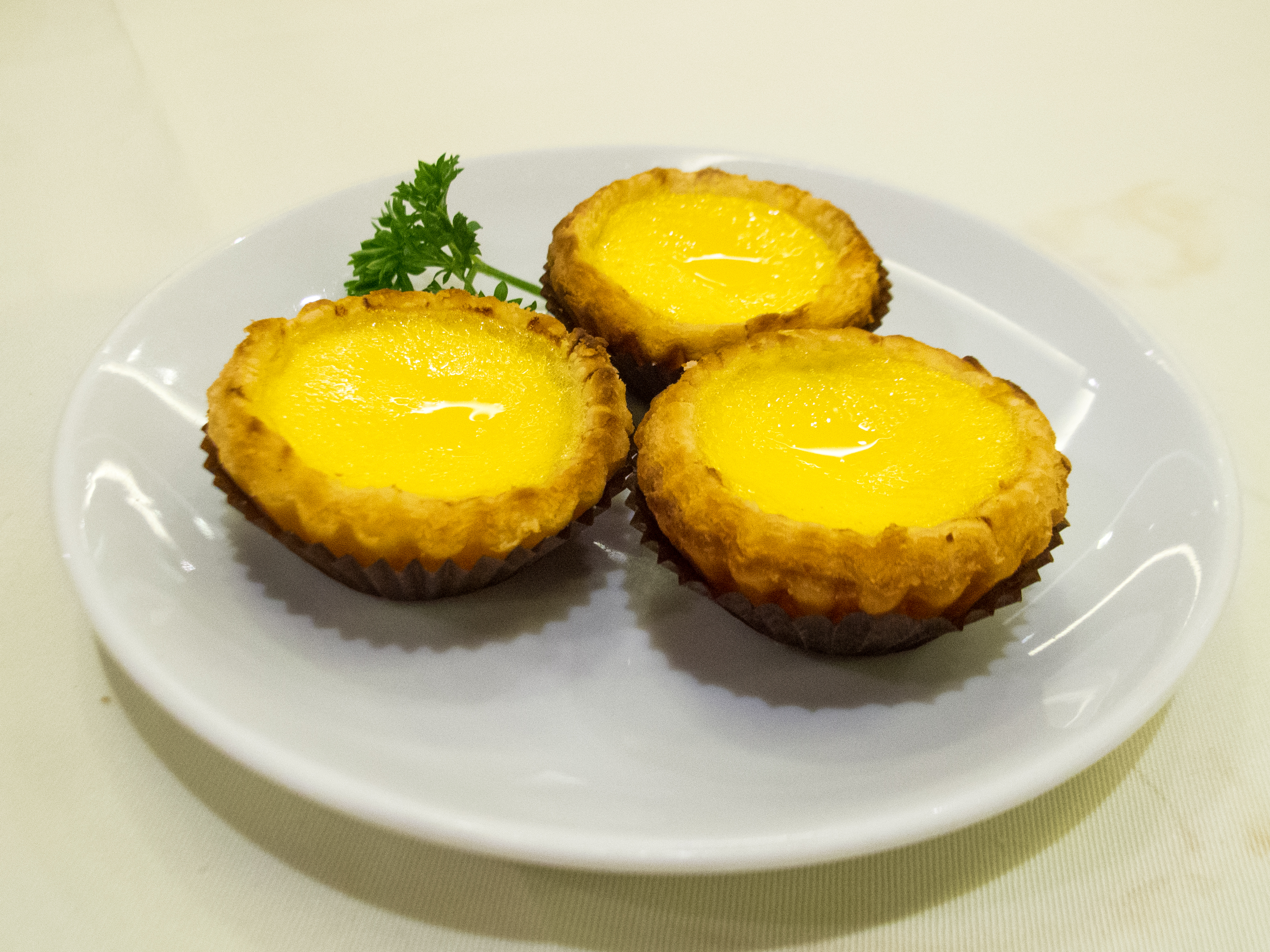
Hong Kong–style egg tart

Hong Kong egg tarts can trace their roots back to Guangzhou, and are a Chinese adaptation of the English custard tart. Egg tarts were introduced to Hong Kong via Guangzhou in the 1940s but initially could only be found in higher-end Western-style restaurants. In the 1960s, cha chaan tengs began to serve egg tarts, popularizing the pastry with the working-class Hong Kong population.

Hong Kong egg tarts are typically smaller and served in twos or threes, in contrast to the original Guangzhou egg tarts which were larger and could be served as a single item. Variations on the custard filling have included chocolate, green tea, or bird's nest as flavourings, and the outer shell may be made with either a shortbread-type crust or with puff pastry made from butter, lard, or vegetable shortening.

In June 2014, the technique of egg tart production was formally included in the Intangible Cultural Heritage Inventory of Hong Kong.

Egg tarts can be found in cha chaan tengs, dim sum parlours, and bakery shops.

=== Macau ===
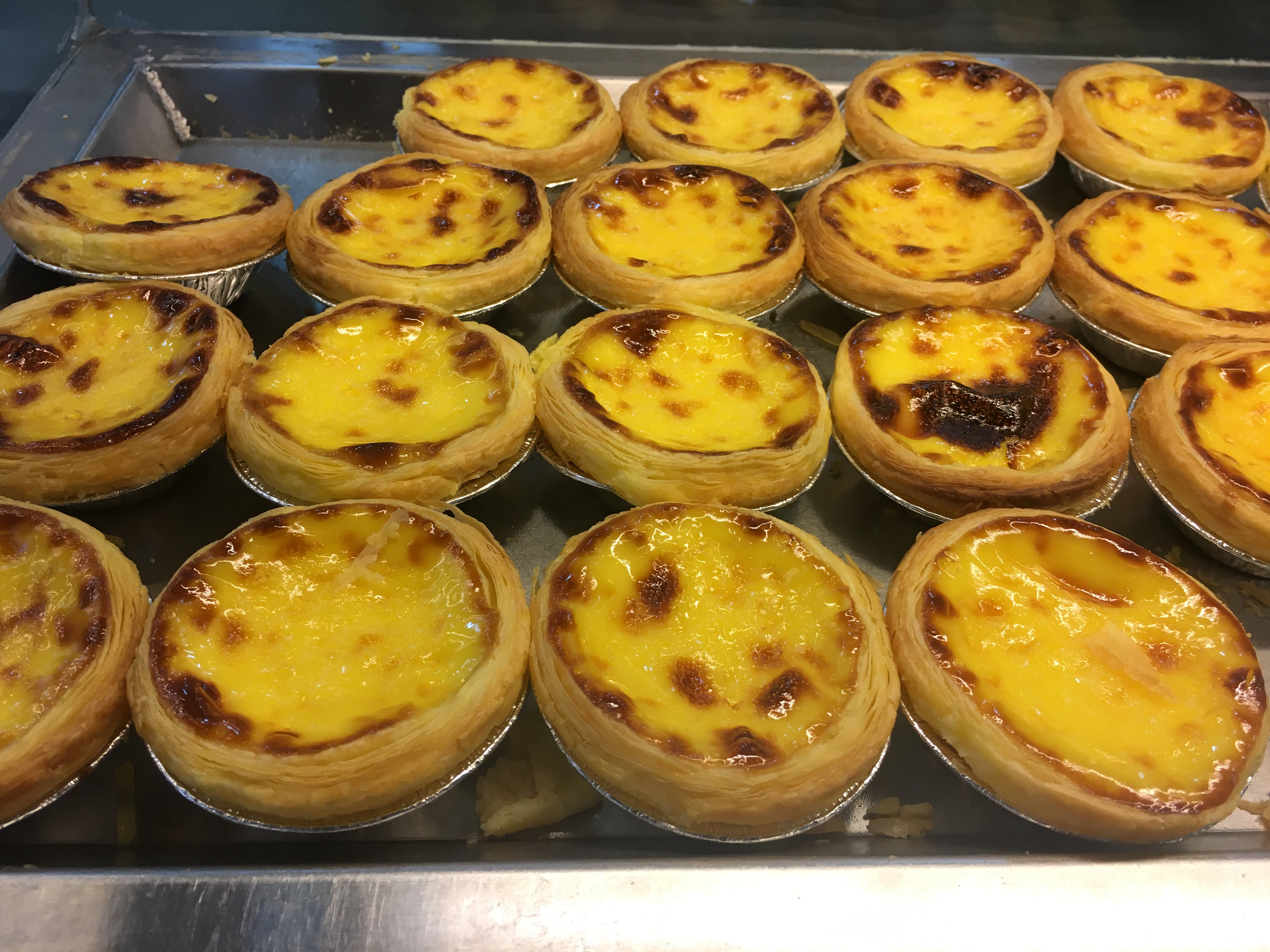
Macau-style pastel de nata

In 1989, the British pharmacist Andrew Stow and his wife Margaret Wong opened Lord Stow's Bakery in Coloane, where they sold Portuguese tarts that copied the pastel de nata. This variation is a Portuguese tart (葡撻; poùh tāat). In 1999, Wong sold the recipe to KFC, which then introduced the Macau-style pastel de nata to other parts of Asia, including Singapore and Taiwan.

In contrast to the Hong Kong–style egg tart, the Macau-style egg tart features a caramelized browned top.

== See also ==
- Custard tart
- Egg pie
- Dim sum
- Flan
- Pastel de nata
- List of custard desserts
- List of egg dishes
- Meringue tart
- Pastry
- Put chai ko
- Quiche
