= Torta de nata =

Colombian dessert

Torta de nata is a traditional Colombian cuisine dessert. It is a cake made with natas, a type of cooked milk, which gives the cake a thick and creamy texture. It can be topped with various fruit toppings or creams.

== See also ==
- Pastel de nata – A different dessert with a similar name
- Tres leches cake – Another dairy-soaked cake
