= Custard =

Semi-solid cooked mixture of milk and egg

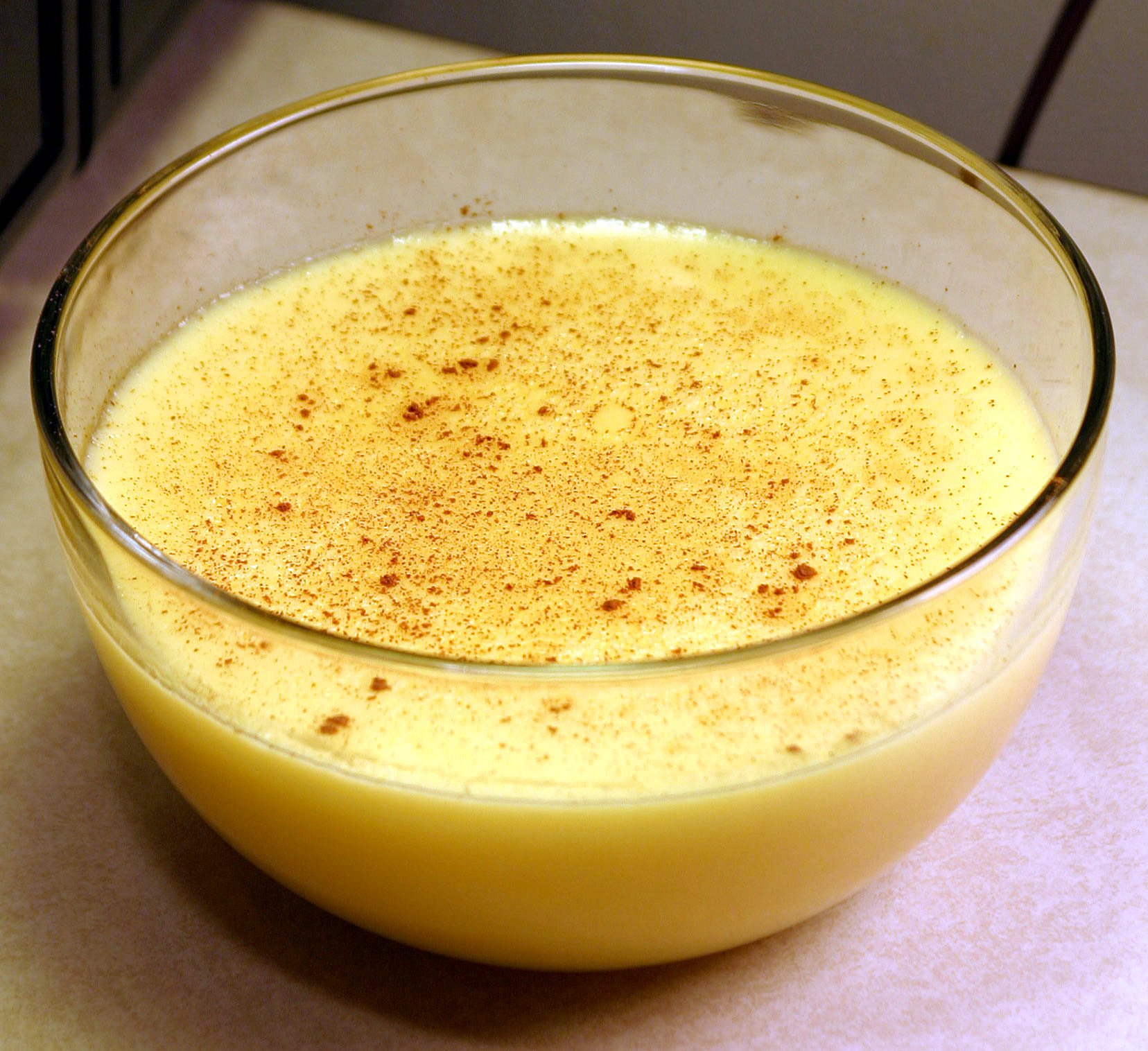
- A bowl of crème anglaise custard, dusted with nutmeg
- Course: Dessert
- Main ingredients: Milk or cream, egg yolks, sugar, vanilla

Custard is a variety of culinary preparations based on sweetened milk, cheese, or cream cooked with egg or egg yolk to thicken it, and sometimes also flour, corn starch, or gelatin. Depending on the recipe, custard may vary in consistency from a thin pouring sauce (crème anglaise) to the thick pastry cream (crème pâtissière) used to fill éclairs. The most common custards are used in custard desserts or dessert sauces and typically include sugar and vanilla; however, savory custards are also found, e.g., in quiche.

== Preparation ==
Custard is usually cooked in a bain-marie, or heated very gently in a saucepan on a stove. However, custard can also be steamed, baked in the oven with or without a water bath, or even cooked in a pressure cooker. Custard preparation is a delicate operation because a temperature increase of 3–6 °C (5.4–10.8 °F) leads to overcooking and curdling. Generally, a fully cooked custard should not exceed 80 °C (176 °F); it begins setting at 70 °C (158 °F). A bain marie water bath slows heat transfer and makes it easier to remove the custard from the oven before it curdles. Adding a small amount of cornflour (known in Canada and the US as 'corn starch') to the egg-sugar mixture stabilises the resulting custard, allowing it to be cooked in a single pan as well as in a double-boiler. A sous-vide water bath may be used to precisely control temperature.

== Variations ==
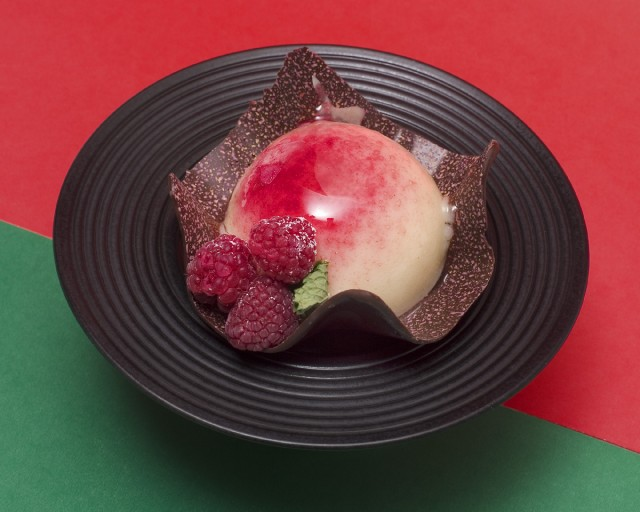
A formal custard preparation, garnished with raspberries

While custard may refer to a wide variety of thickened dishes, technically (and in French cookery) the word custard (crème or more precisely crème moulée, [kʁɛm mule]) refers only to an egg-thickened custard.

When starch is added, the result is called 'pastry cream' (French: crème pâtissière, pronounced [kʁɛm pɑtisjɛːʁ]) or confectioners' custard, made with a combination of milk or cream, egg yolks, fine sugar, flour or some other starch, and usually a flavoring such as vanilla, chocolate, or lemon. Crème pâtissière is a key ingredient in many French desserts, including mille-feuille (or Napoleons) and filed tarts. It is also used in Italian pastry and sometimes in Boston cream pie. The starch prevents over-cooking the eggs, and sets the cream (usually requiring it to be beaten or whipped before use).

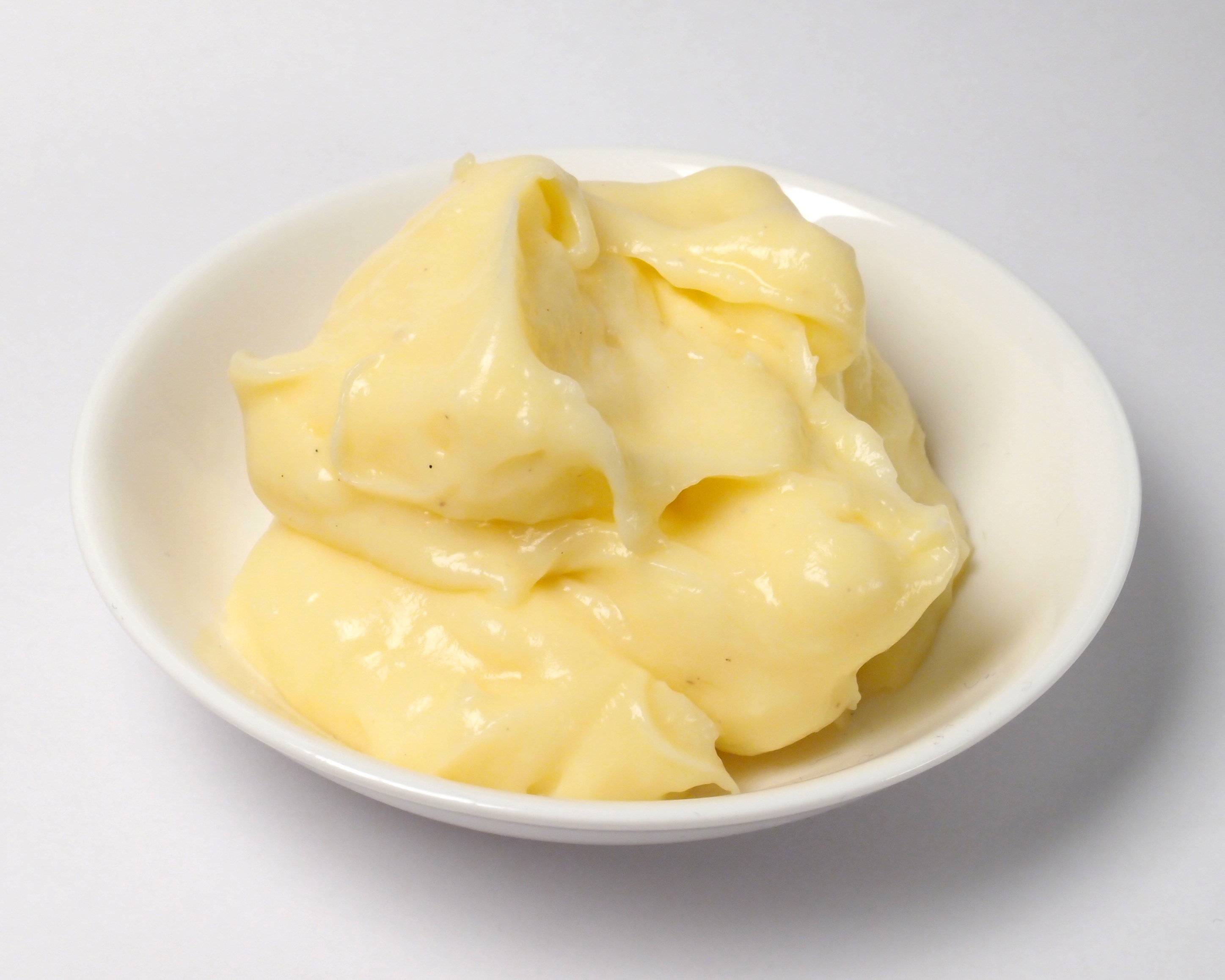
Pastry cream

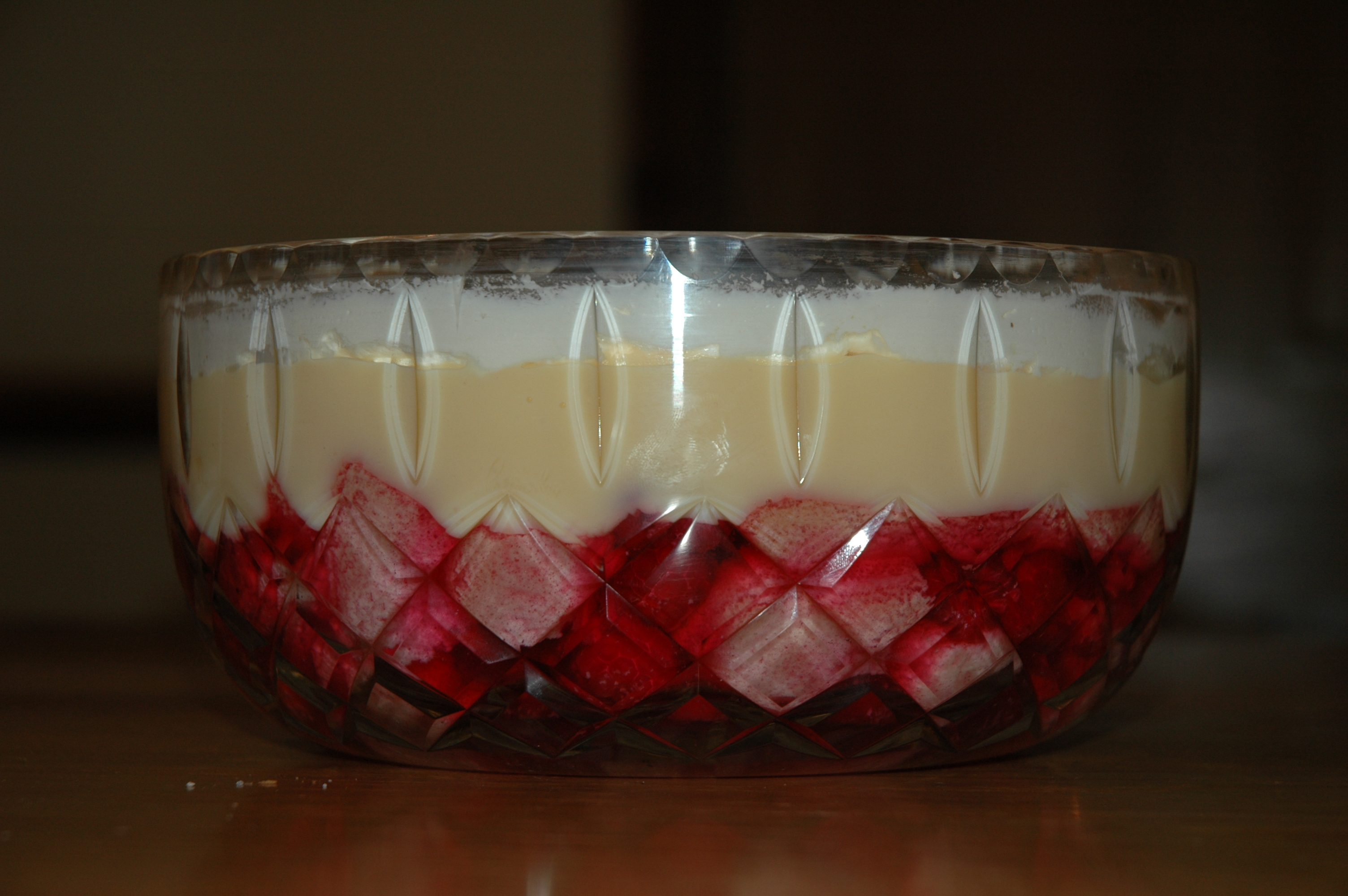
Layers of a trifle showing the custard in between cake, fruit and whipped cream

When gelatin is added, it is known as crème anglaise collée ([kʁɛm ɑ̃ɡlɛz kɔle]).

In the United Kingdom, custard has various traditional recipes some thickened principally with cornflour (cornstarch) rather than the egg component, others involving regular flour; see custard powder.

A quiche is a savoury custard tart. Some kinds of timbale or vegetable loaf are made of a custard base mixed with chopped savoury ingredients. Custard royale is a thick custard cut into decorative shapes and used to garnish soup, stew or broth. In German, it is known as Eierstich and is used as a garnish in German wedding soup (Hochzeitssuppe). Chawanmushi is a Japanese savoury custard, steamed and served in a small bowl or on a saucer. Chinese steamed egg is a similar but larger savoury egg dish. Bougatsa is a Greek breakfast pastry whose sweet version consists of semolina custard filling between layers of phyllo. In Peru, leche asada ('baked milk') is custard baked in individual molds. It is considered a restaurant dish.

== Uses ==
Recipes involving sweet custard are listed in the custard dessert category, and include:

- Banana custard
- Bavarian cream
- Bienenstich
- Boston cream pie
- Bougatsa
- Chiboust cream
- Cream pie
- Crème brûlée
- Crème caramel
- Cremeschnitte
- Custard tart
- Danish pastry
- Egg tart
- Eggnog
- English trifle
- Flan
- Floating island
- Frangipane, with almonds
- Frozen custard
- Fruit salad
- Galaktoboureko
- Manchester tart
- Muhallebi
- Natillas
- Pastel de nata
- Pudding
- Taiyaki
- Vanilla slice
- Vla
- Zabaione

== History ==
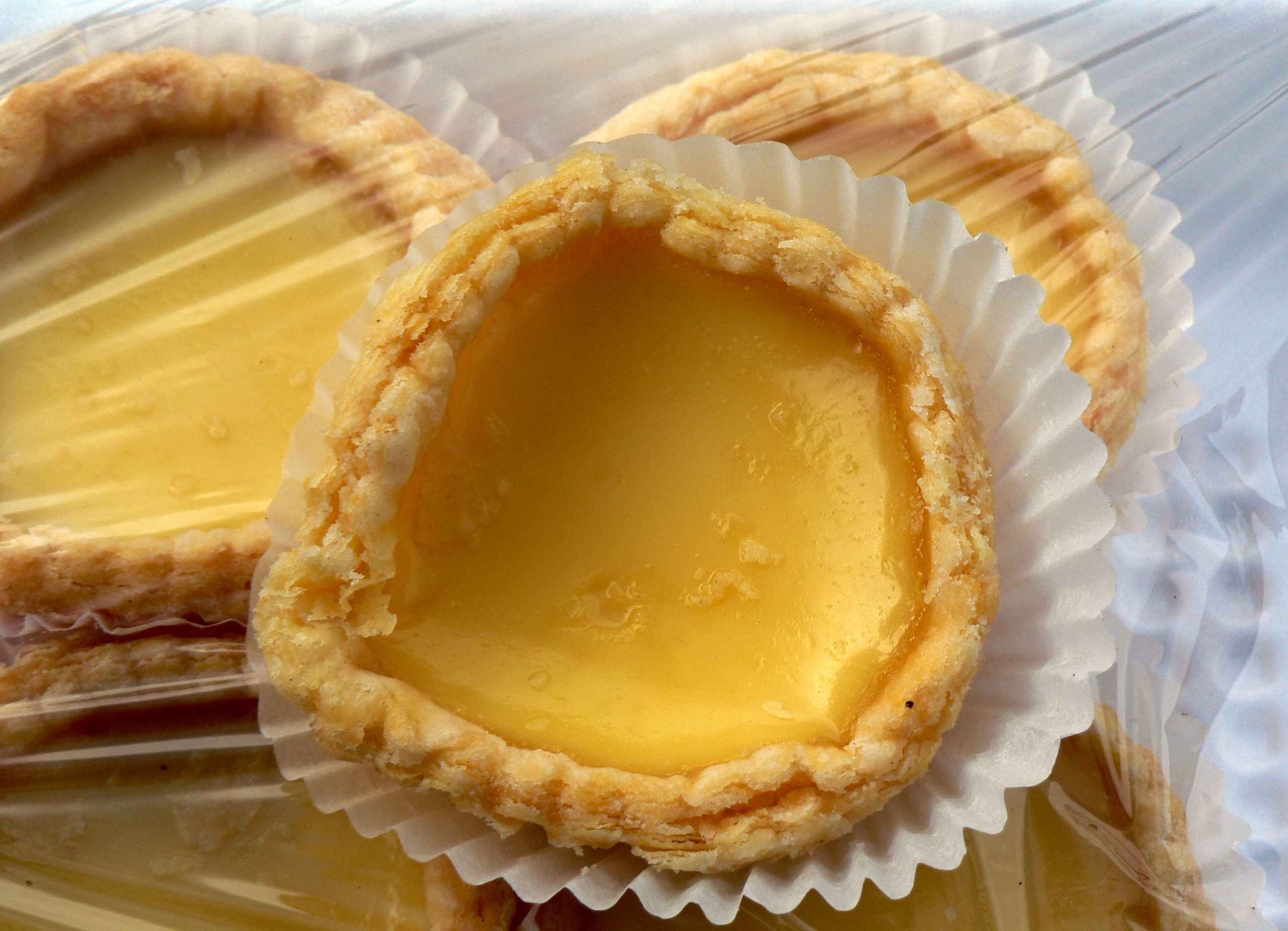
Custard tarts

Custards baked in pastry (custard tarts) were very popular in the Middle Ages, and are the origin of the English word 'custard': the French term croustade originally referred to the crust of a tart, and is derived from the Italian word crostata, and ultimately the Latin crustāre.

Examples include Crustardes of flessh and Crustade, in the 14th century English collection The Forme of Cury. These recipes include solid ingredients such as meat, fish, and fruit bound by the custard. Stirred custards cooked in pots are also found under the names Creme Boylede and Creme boiled. Some custards especially in the Elizabethan era used marigold (calendula) to give the custard color.

In modern times, the name 'custard' is sometimes applied to starch-thickened preparations like blancmange and Bird's Custard powder.

== Chemistry ==
Stirred custard is thickened by coagulation of egg protein, while the same gives baked custard its gel structure. The type of milk used also impacts the result. Most important to a successfully stirred custard is to avoid excessive heat that will cause over-coagulation and syneresis that will result in a curdled custard.

Eggs contain the proteins necessary for the gel structure to form, and emulsifiers to maintain the structure. Egg yolk also contains enzymes like amylase, which can break down added starch. This enzyme activity contributes to the overall thinning of custard in the mouth. Egg yolk lecithin also helps to maintain the milk-egg interface. The proteins in egg whites are set at 60–80 °C (140–176 °F).

Starch is sometimes added to custard to prevent premature curdling. The starch acts as a heat buffer in the mixture: as they hydrate, they absorb heat and help maintain a constant rate of heat transfer. Starches also make for a smoother texture and thicker mouth feel.

If the mixture pH is 9 or higher, the gel is too hard; if it is below 5, the gel structure has difficulty forming because protonation prevents the formation of covalent bonds.

== Physical-chemical properties ==
Cooked (set) custard is a weak gel, viscous, and thixotropic; while it does become easier to stir the more it is manipulated, it does not, unlike many other thixotropic liquids, recover its lost viscosity over time. On the other hand, a suspension of uncooked imitation custard powder (starch) in water, with the proper proportions, has the opposite rheological property: it is negative thixotropic, or dilatant, allowing the demonstration of "walking on custard".

== See also ==
- List of desserts
- List of custard desserts
- Custard cream
- Bird's Custard – brand of imitation custard
- Eggnog – sweetened dairy-based beverage
- Pudding – dessert or savory dish
