= Custard tart =

Baked dessert consisting of an egg custard-filled pastry crust

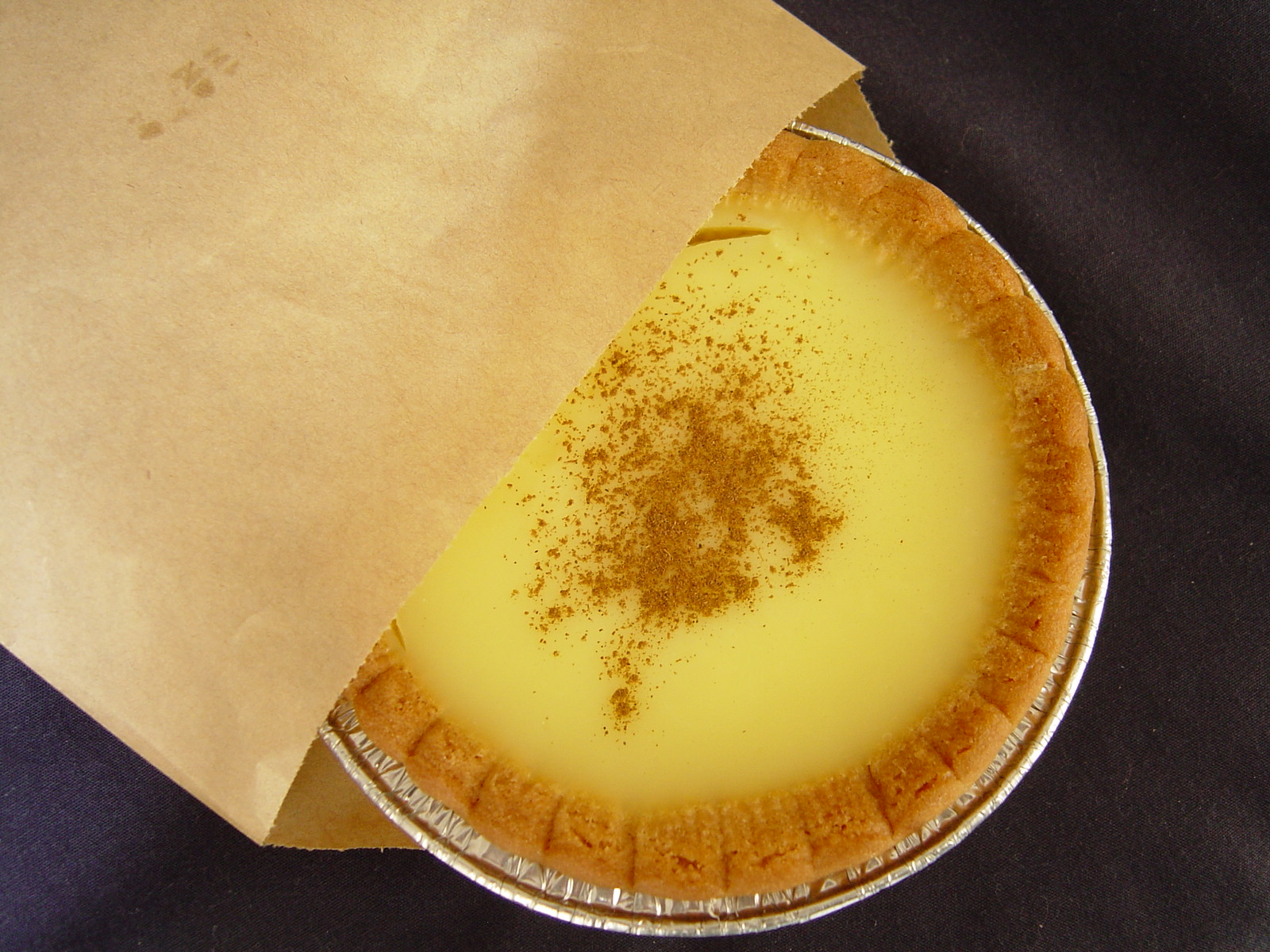
- Type: Tart
- Place of origin: France, United Kingdom
- Serving temperature: Cold
- Main ingredients: Shortcrust pastry, egg, custard

Custard tarts or flan pâtissier/parisien are a baked tart consisting of an outer pastry crust filled with custard.

== History ==
The development of custard is so intimately connected with the custard tart or pie that the word itself comes from Anglo-Norman *crustade (unattested), meaning a kind of pie. It is derived from Anglo-Norman crust (> English crust) corresponding to French croust. It is related to the 18th century French term croustade, probably borrowed from the Italian crostata (already mentioned 13th century), derived from crosta (croûte in French), more probably than the Occitan: croustado, lit. 'tart'. Some other names for varieties of custard tarts in the Middle Ages were doucettes and darioles. In 1399, the coronation banquet prepared for Henry IV included "doucettys".

Medieval recipes generally included a shortcrust and puff pastry case filled with a mixture of cream, milk, or broth, with eggs, sweeteners such as sugar or honey, and sometimes spices. Recipes existed as early as the fourteenth century that would still be recognisable as custard tarts today. Tarts could also be prepared with almond milk during times of fasting such as Lent, though this was rather expensive and would have been available only to the well-off. Often, savoury ingredients such as minced pork or beef marrow were also added (the combining of sweet and savoury ingredients was more common in medieval England), but unlike a modern quiche the custard filling itself was invariably sweet.

== Modern versions ==
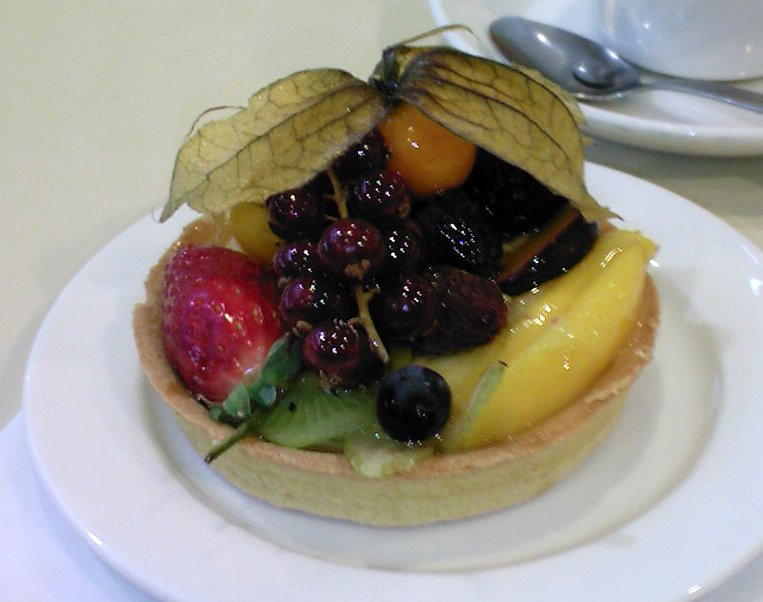
A fruit-topped tart with custard filling

Modern custard tarts are usually made from shortcrust pastry, eggs, sugar, milk or cream, and vanilla, sprinkled with nutmeg and then baked. Unlike egg tart, custard tarts are normally served at room temperature. They are available either as individual tarts, generally around 8 cm (3.1 in) across, or as larger tarts intended to be divided into slices.

=== Britain and Commonwealth ===
Custard tarts have long been a favourite pastry in Britain and the Commonwealth, where they are often called "egg custard tarts" or simply "egg custards" to distinguish the egg-based filling from the commonly served cornflour-based custards. They are sold in supermarkets and bakeries throughout the UK.

In the UK, the custard tart is regarded as a classic British dish. A version by Marcus Wareing was selected on the BBC television programme Great British Menu as the final course of a banquet to celebrate Queen Elizabeth's 80th birthday. The tarts are either made as a single large tart from which slices are cut, or as smaller individual tartlets. Classically, they are invariably topped only with a dusting of nutmeg – fruit topping in the French style, or cinnamon dusting in the Dutch, is not typical.

Variations on the classic recipe include the Manchester tart, where a layer of jam is spread on the pastry before the custard is added. Other versions may have some fresh fruit, or rhubarb, cooked into the filling. Versions topped with elaborate arrangements of fruit show the influence of French pâtisserie.

=== Hong Kong ===
The egg tart (traditional Chinese: 蛋撻; simplified Chinese: 蛋挞; Cantonese Yale: daahn tāat; pinyin: dàntǎ) is a kind of custard tart found in Chinese cuisine derived from the English custard tart and Portuguese pastel de nata. The dish consists of an outer pastry crust filled with egg custard. Egg tarts are often served at dim sum restaurants, bakeries and Cha chaan teng.

=== Indonesia ===
The Indonesian version is called pai susu (milk custard pie) from Bali. This pastry consists of an outer pastry crust filled with egg custard and condensed milk, and then baked. Contrary to other versions of this pie, this Indonesian version is very flat, with the filling consisting of only one very thin layer of custard. Another type of Indonesian pie tart is pastel de nata (derived from Portuguese cuisine due to historical ties).

=== France ===
Custard tarts in France, where they are known as flans pâtissiers, may be filled with fruit, making them similar to clafoutis. Some may contain reconstituted shortbread.

=== Romania ===
Alivenci, plural form of alivancă, is a traditional custard tart, from the cuisine of Moldavia made with cornmeal, cream cheese like urdă or telemea and smântână.

A form of cheesecake was popular in Ancient Greece. The secret of its manufacture was passed during the Roman invasions. At that time, the Latin name used for this type of cake was placenta that was transmitted in Romanian culture.

=== Philippines ===
Egg pie is a traditional custard tart from the Philippines. The egg custard in it has a toasty brown top to it from egg whites.

=== Portugal ===
Pastel de nata (Portuguese pronunciation: [pɐʃˈtɛɫ dɨ ˈnatɐ][b] (plural: pastéis de nata; [-ˈtɛjʃ-], [-ˈtɐjʃ-][c])) is a Portuguese egg custard tart pastry, optionally dusted with cinnamon. Outside Portugal, they are particularly popular in other parts of Western Europe, Asia and former Portuguese colonies, such as Brazil, Mozambique, Macau, Goa and East Timor.

=== South Africa ===
Melktert (/ˈmɛlktɛrt/, Afrikaans for milk tart) is a South African dessert originally created by the Dutch settlers in the "Cape" (South Africa) consisting of a sweet pastry crust containing a custard filling made from milk, flour, sugar and eggs. The ratio of milk to eggs is higher than in a traditional Portuguese custard tart, British custard tart or Chinese egg tart, resulting in a lighter texture and a stronger milk flavour.

The dessert originated among settlers at the Dutch Cape Colony in the 17th century, and is believed to have developed from the Dutch mattentaart, a cheesecake-like dessert which was included in the cookbook Een Notabel Boexcken Van Cokeryen (A Notable Book of Cookery) published by Thomas van der Noot around 1514. Some recipes require that the custard be baked in the crust, while others call for the custard to be prepared in advance, and then placed in the crust before serving. Cinnamon is often sprinkled over its surface, and the milk used for the custard may also be infused with a cinnamon stick before preparation. A staple at church fetes and home industries, and commonplace in South African supermarkets, melktert may be served chilled or at room temperature, or slightly warmed.

== See also ==
- Buttermilk pie
- Custard pie
- Mille-feuille
- Chocolate tart
- List of custard desserts
- List of desserts
- List of pies, tarts and flans
