= Pastel de nata =

Portuguese egg tart pastry dusted with cinnamon

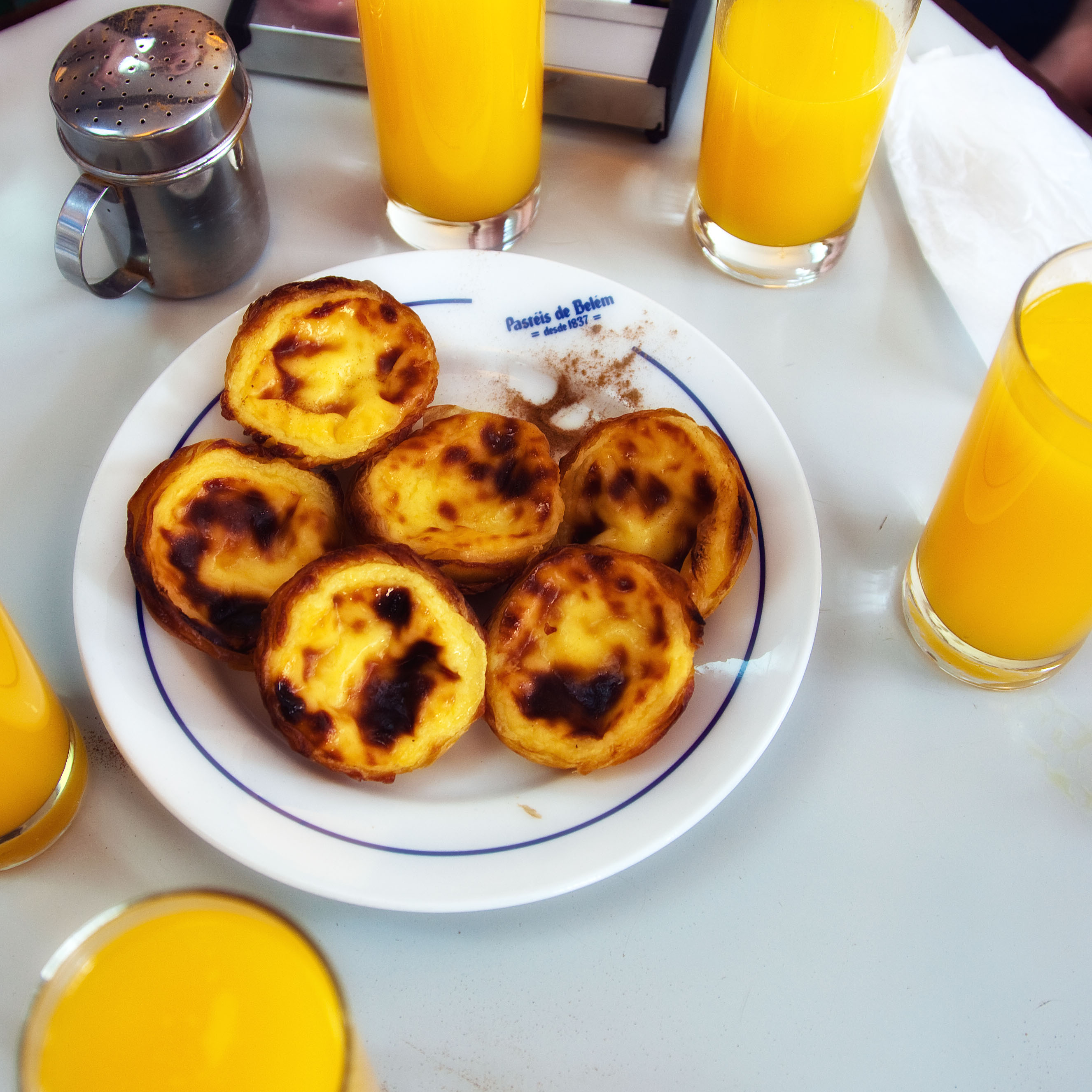
- The typical appearance of the pastel de nata in Lisbon, Portugal
- Alternative names: Pastel de Belém; Pastries of Bethlehem; Portuguese Egg Tart
- Course: Dessert
- Place of origin: Portugal
- Region or state: Belém, Lisbon (originally); produced worldwide within the Lusosphere
- Created by: Religious of the Jerónimos Monastery
- Serving temperature: Fresh from oven, with cinnamon and icing sugar
- Main ingredients: Egg yolks
- Variations: Egg tart, custard tart
- Food energy (per serving): 1,300 kilojoules (299 kcal)

Pastel de nata (Portuguese: [pɐʃˈtɛl dɨ ˈnatɐ]; literally, cream pastry; pl.: pastéis de nata) is a Portuguese egg custard tart pastry, optionally dusted with cinnamon. Outside Portugal, they are particularly popular in other parts of Western Europe, former Portuguese colonies, such as Brazil, Mozambique, Macau, Goa, Malacca and Timor-Leste, and other parts of Asia. The Macau variant has been adopted by KFC and is available in regions such as mainland China, Hong Kong, Taiwan, Thailand, South Korea, Singapore and Malaysia. In Indonesia, this pastry is especially popular in Kampung Tugu, Jakarta, a culturally Portuguese (Mardijker) enclave.

== History ==
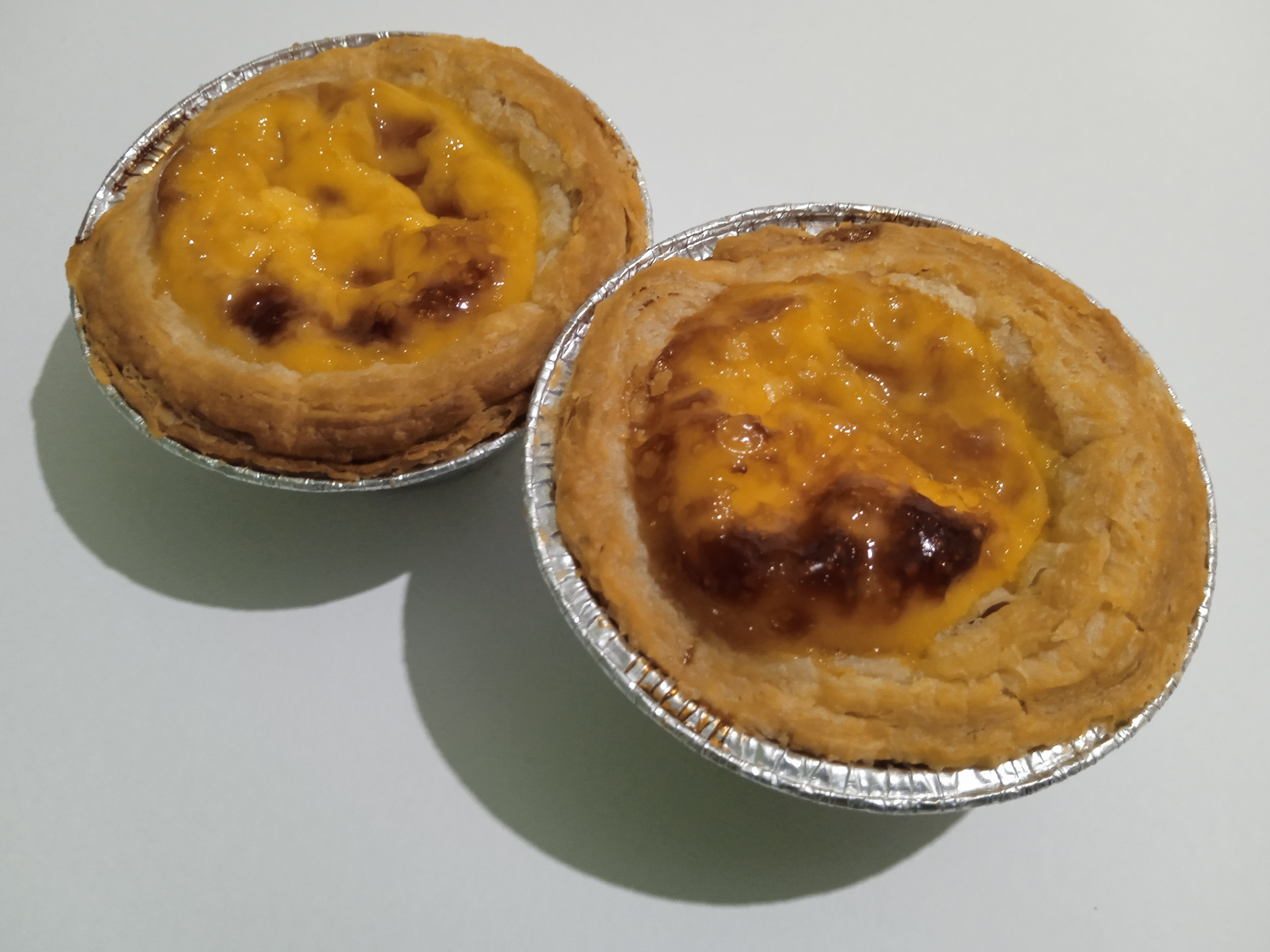
Pastel de nata (locally known as tart telur Portugis) in Malaysia

Pastéis de nata tarts are pastries inspired by an original recipe called pastéis de Belém, which were created before the 18th century by Catholic monks at the Jerónimos Monastery in the civil parish of Belém, in Lisbon. At the time, convents and monasteries used large quantities of egg-whites for starching clothes, such as friars and nuns' religious habits. It was quite common for monasteries and convents to use the leftover egg yolks to make cakes and pastries, resulting in the proliferation of sweet pastry recipes throughout the country.

In the aftermath of the Liberal Revolution of 1820, following the dissolution of religious orders and in the face of the impending closure of many convents and monasteries, the monks started selling pastéis de nata at a nearby sugar refinery to bring in revenue. In 1834, the monastery was closed and the recipe sold to the sugar refinery, whose owners opened the Fábrica de Pastéis de Belém in 1837. The descendants own the business to this day.

Since the opening of Fábrica de Pastéis de Belém, the original recipe that inspired pastel de nata varieties is kept in a secret room. The Fábrica de Pastéis de Belém is, therefore, the only place in the world that produces the original pastry that inspired many variations commonly known as "pastéis de nata"; the shop is located just a short three-minute walk from the Jerónimos Monastery. The shop offers both takeout and sit-in services and sells over 20,000 pastéis a day.

In 2009, The Guardian listed pastéis de Belém as one of the 50 "best things to eat" in the world. In 2011, following the result of a public vote, the pastry was announced as one of Portugal's Seven Wonders of Gastronomy, further cementing it as one of the country's most popular national dishes.

== See also ==
- List of egg dishes
- Torta de nata

== Bibliography ==
- Merle, Dominick (11 August 2004), "There's history - and a secret - in every bite", The Christian Science Monitor
- Leite, David (8 September 2004), "Pastéis de Belém–The World's First Pastéis de Nata", Leite's Culinaria
- Amaral, André; Pires, Carla; Castro e Silva, Daniel; Medeiros, Luís; André, Mário Rui (December 2011), O Segredo do Marketing dos Pastéis de Belém (PDF) (in Portuguese), Lisbon, Portugal: Escola Superior de Comunicação Social, Instituto Politécnico de Lisboa, archived from the original (PDF) on 1 October 2022
