= Custard pie =

Pastry container with a sweet egg mixture

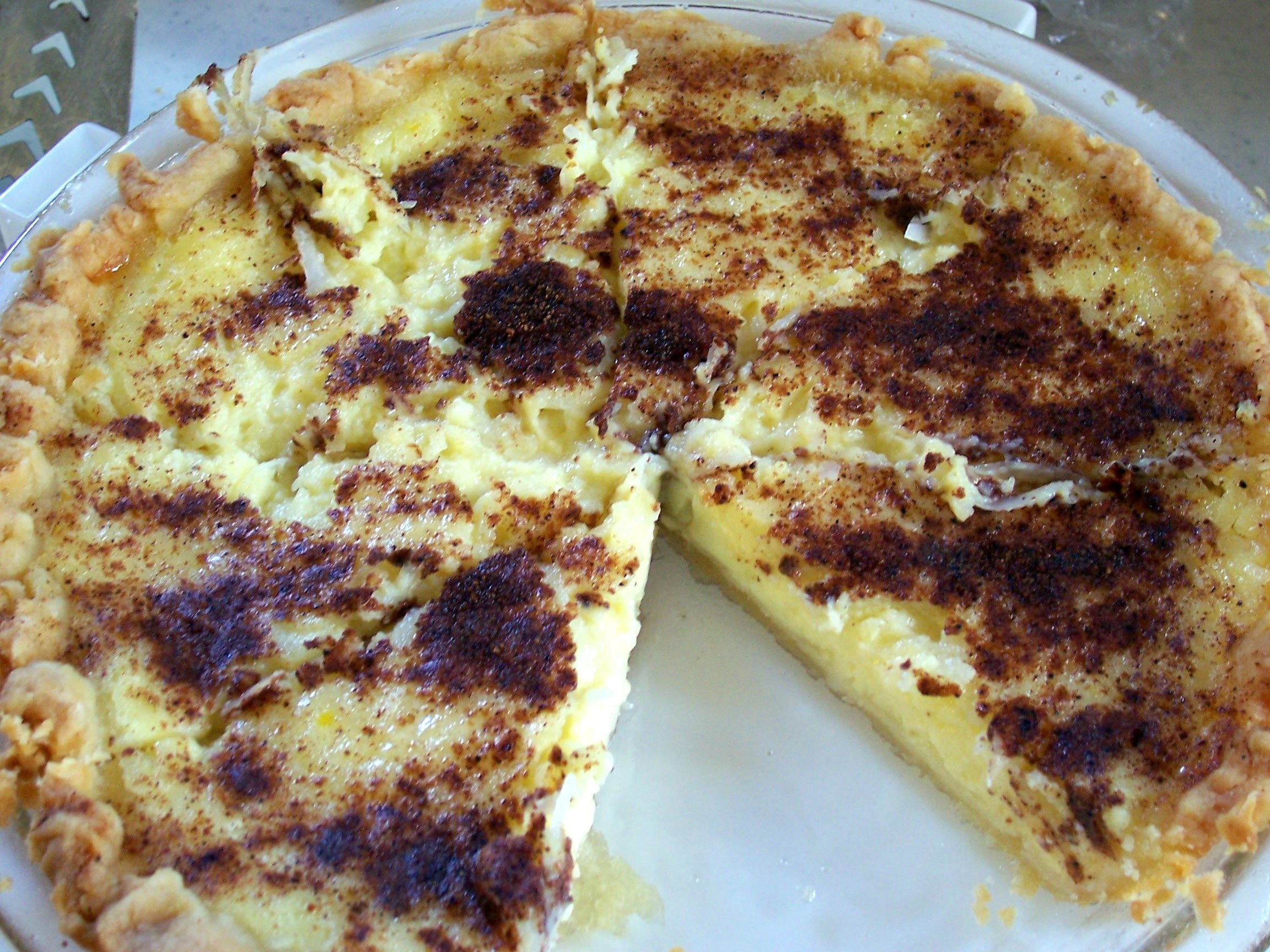
- A version of coconut cream pie
- Type: Pie
- Main ingredients: Pie shell, custard

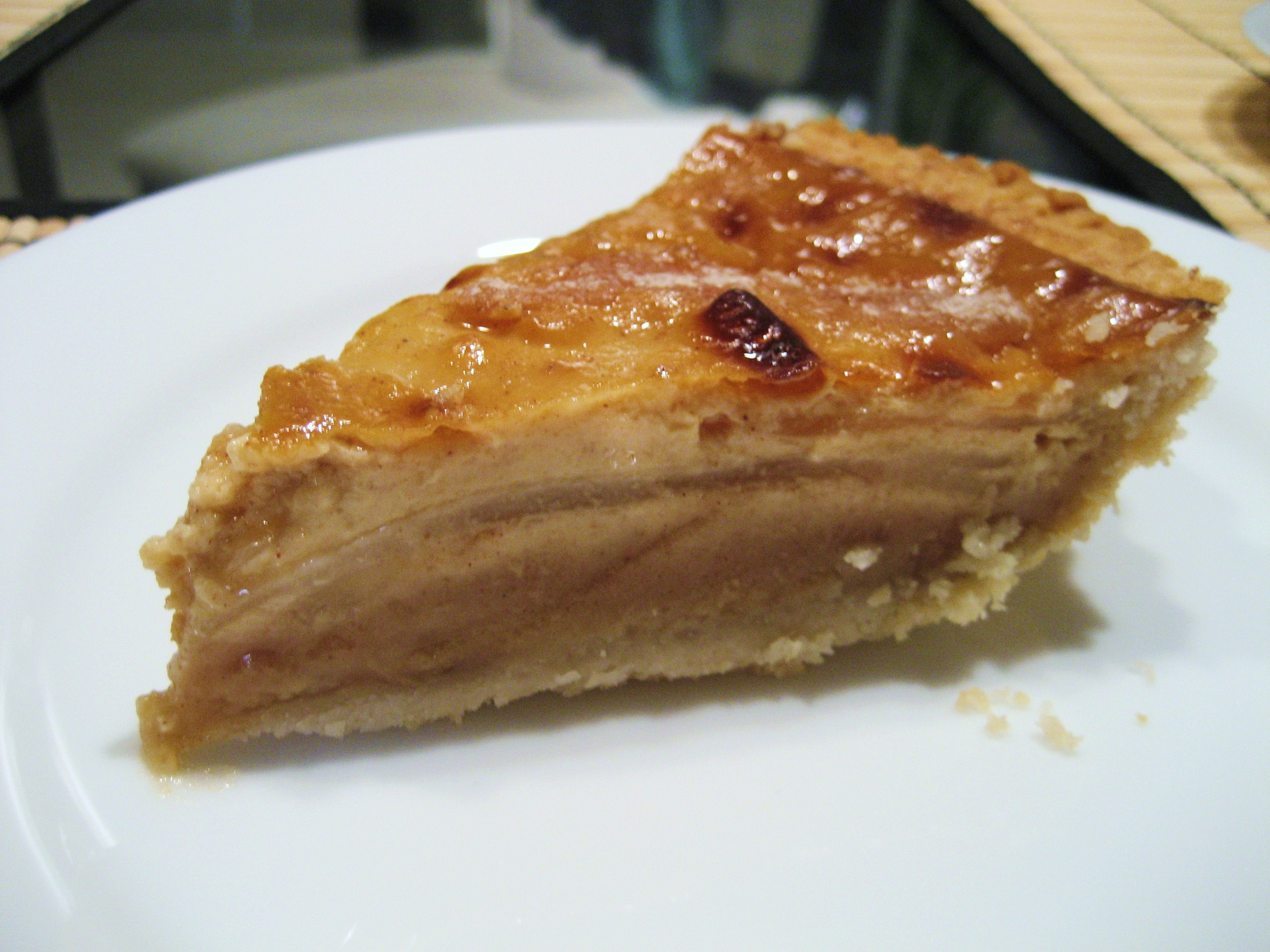
Pear custard pie

A custard pie is any type of uncooked custard mixture placed in an uncooked or partially cooked crust and baked together. In North America, "custard pie" commonly refers to a plain mixture of milk, eggs, sugar, salt, vanilla extract and sometimes nutmeg combined with a pie crust. It is distinctly different from a cream pie, which contains cooked custard poured into a cooled, precooked crust. In the United Kingdom, the comical or political act of pieing is conventionally done with a "custard pie". Some common custard pies include pumpkin pie, lemon and buttermilk chess pie, coconut cream pie, and buko pie. True custard is defined as a liquid thickened with eggs. The often large number of whole eggs in custard pie make it very rich.

Cooks in Classical antiquity understood the binding properties of eggs. During the Middle Ages, the first custard pies – in the modern sense of the term – began to appear. Initially, custards were used only as fillings for pies, pastries and tarts. Both Europe and Asia had recipes that contained custards.

The word "custard" derives from crustade (a pie with a crust), or from croustade (an edible container of savoury food). After the 16th century, custards began to be used in individual dishes rather than as a filling in crusts.

Today, custards are used as filling in pies and tarts, and as individual dishes.

== History ==
Savory pies with meat fillings were far more common than sweet pies in the Cuisine of the Thirteen Colonies. Sweet pies, when they were available, were made with a simple custard base of fresh milk, sugar and eggs. Some of these traditional pies like buttermilk pie, almond custard, Irish potato pie and bean pie (associated with the Nation of Islam) are uncommon in modern times.

== As a comedic device ==
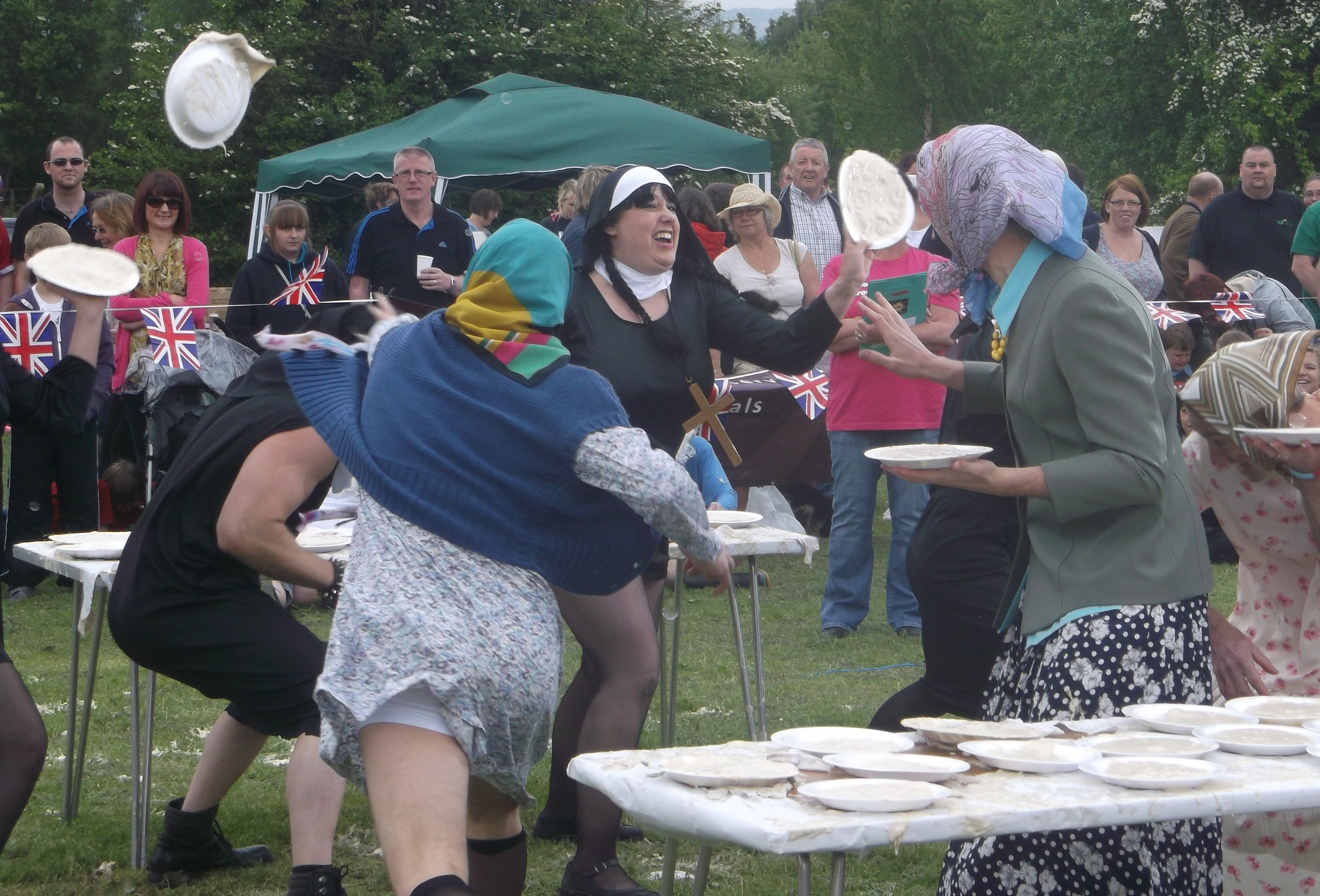
Custard Pie Throwing at Coxheath, during the World Custard Pie Throwing Championship

In British English, pies thrown or pushed into the face are usually referred to as "custard pies". Custard pies are used as a comedic device by clowns in many circus performances, in practical jokes for harmless fun and also for throwing into the faces of public figures as a sign of disapproval. UK Saturday morning programme Tiswas had custard pies as a regular feature and even had a character called The Phantom Flan Flinger, a masked man who pied people. The World Custard Pie Throwing Championships take place annually in the village of Coxheath in Kent, England.

== See also ==
- Bougatsa
- Coconut pie
- Chess pie
- Cream pie
- Egg pie
- List of custard desserts
