= Pie =

Savoury or sweet baked dish made with pastry

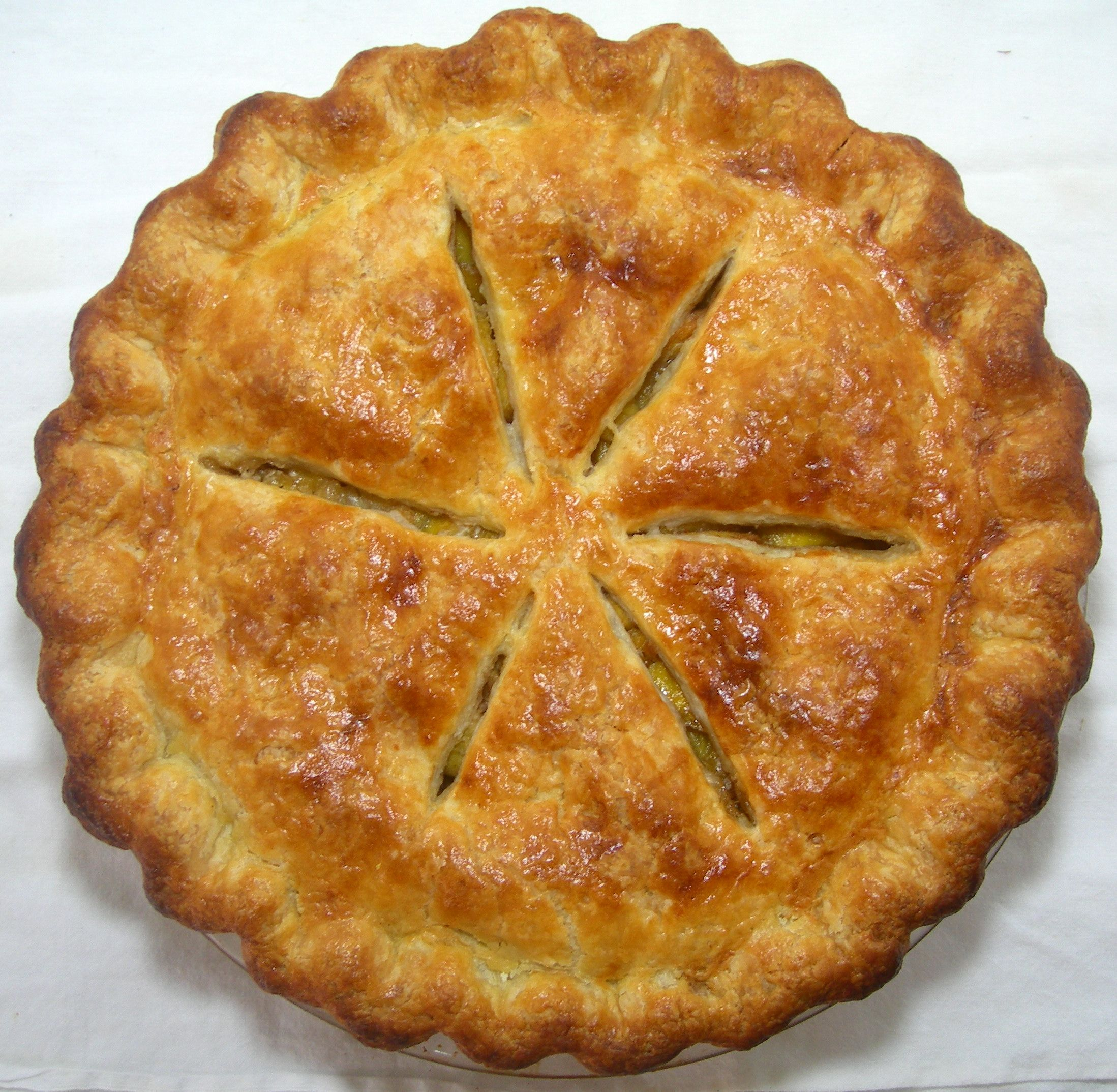
- Main ingredients: Pastry
- Variations: Fruit, meat, transparent, custard, cream, no-bake, vegan

A pie is a baked dish which is usually made of a pastry dough casing that contains a filling of various sweet or savoury ingredients. Sweet pies may be filled with fruit (as in an apple pie), nuts (pecan pie), fruit preserves (jam tart), brown sugar (tarte au sucre), sweetened vegetables (rhubarb pie), or with thicker fillings based on eggs and dairy (as in custard pie and cream pie). Savoury pies may be filled with meat (as in a steak pie or a bacon and egg pie), eggs and cheese (such as quiches or British flans), or a mixture of meat and vegetables (pot pie or Corned beef pie).

Pies can be made from two pieces of pastry dough, known as a base and a top (also known as a two-crust or double crust) or just a top (also known as a top-crust), or just a base (also known as a single-crust or bottom-crust). Common pastry used include Shortcrust pastry, Puff pastry and Filo. However, some pies may use baking powder biscuits, mashed potatoes, Digestive biscuits and crumbs.

Pies can be a variety of sizes, ranging from bite-size to those designed for multiple servings.

== Etymology ==
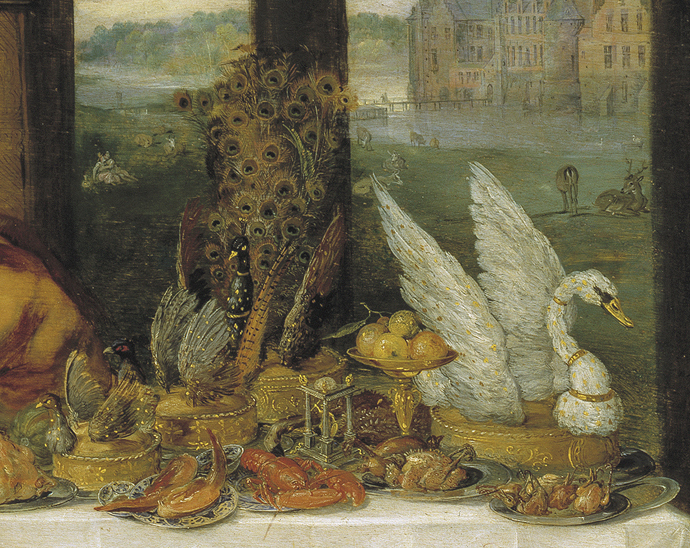
A detail of a painting by Jan Brueghel the Elder (1568–1625) and Peter Paul Rubens (1577–1640) depicting several bird pies. Cooked birds were frequently placed by European royal cooks on top of a large pie to identify its contents.

The first known use of the word 'pie' appears in 1303 in the expense accounts of the Bolton Priory in Yorkshire. However, the Oxford English Dictionary is uncertain to its origin and says 'no further related word is known outside English'. A possible origin is that the word 'pie' is connected with a word used in farming to indicate 'a collection of things made into a heap', for example a heap of potatoes covered with earth. Depending on the region, the spelling of the word could be written as pie, pey, pi, pye, pay, poi, and poy.

One source of the word "pie" may be the magpie, a "bird known for collecting odds and ends in its nest"; the connection could be that Medieval pies also contained many different animal meats, including chickens, crows, pigeons and rabbits. One 1450 recipe for "grete pyes" that might support the "magpie" etymology contained what Charles Perry called "odds and ends", including: "...beef, beef suet, capons, hens, both mallard and teal ducks, rabbits, woodcocks and large birds such as herons and storks, plus beef marrow, hard-cooked egg yolks, dates, raisins and prunes."

== History ==
=== Antiquity ===
Early pies were in the form of flat, round or freeform crusty cakes similar to galettes consisting of a crust of ground oats, wheat, rye, or barley containing honey inside. These pies developed into a form of early sweet pastry or desserts, evidence of which can be found on the tomb walls of the Pharaoh Ramesses II, who ruled from 1304 to 1237 BC, located in the Valley of the Kings. Sometime before 2000 BC, a recipe for chicken pie was written on a tablet in Sumer.

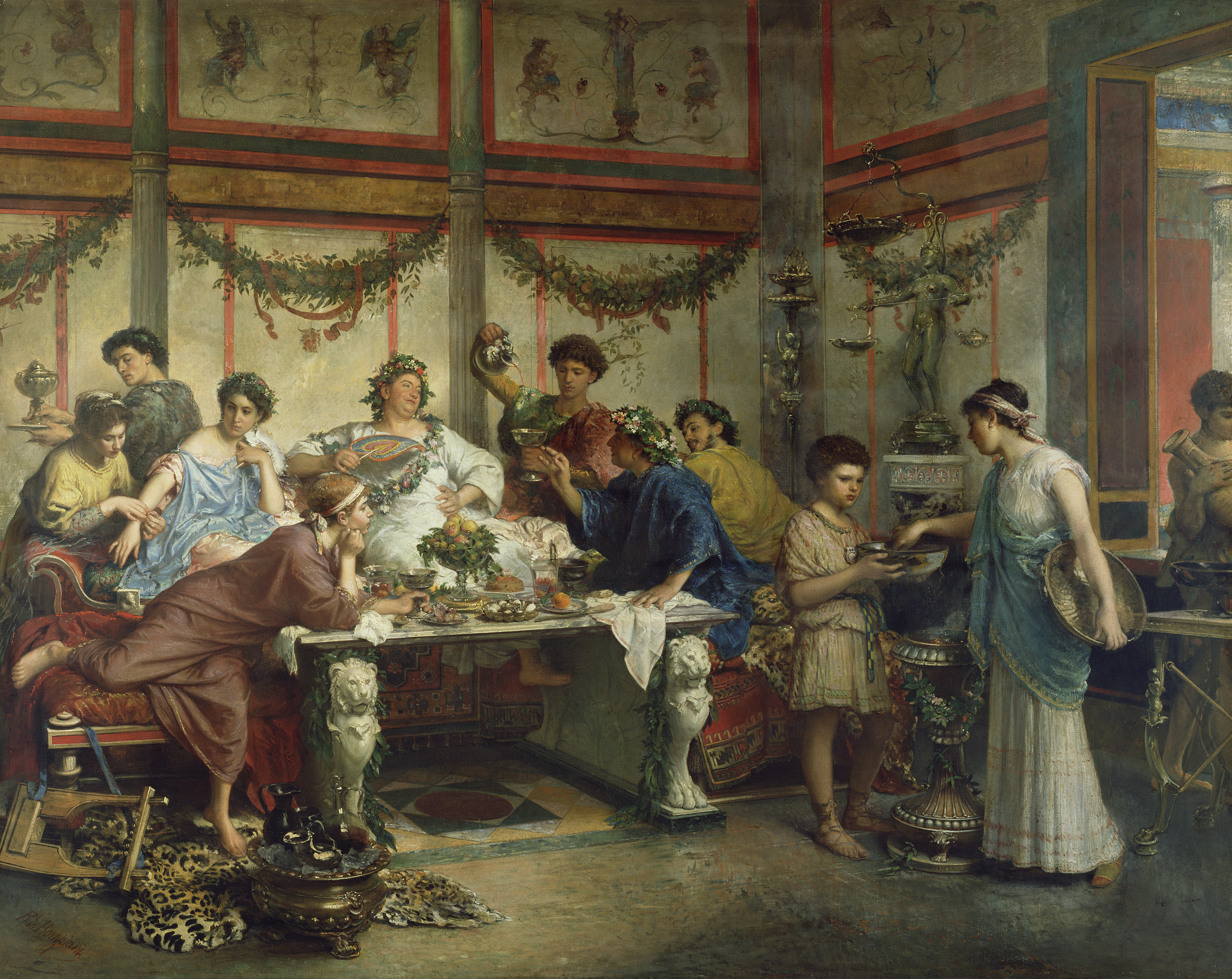
A 19th-century depiction of a Roman feast, where pastry-covered meat dishes were served

The Romans made a plain pastry of flour, oil, and water to cover meats and fowls which were baked, thus keeping in the juices. The Roman approach of covering "...birds or hams with dough" has been called more of an attempt to prevent the meat from drying out during baking than an actual pie in the modern sense. The covering was not meant to be eaten. It filled the role of what was later called puff paste. A richer pastry, intended to be eaten, was used to make small pasties containing eggs or little birds which were among the minor items served at banquets. The first written reference to a Roman pie is for a rye dough that was filled with a mixture of goat's cheese and honey.

The 1st-century Roman cookbook Apicius makes various mentions of recipes which involve a pie case. By 160 BC, Roman statesman Marcus Porcius Cato (234–149 BC), who wrote De Agri Cultura, notes the recipe for the most popular pie/cake called placenta. Alongside similar dishes such as the Roman libum, it was more like a modern-day cheesecake on a pastry base, often used as an offering to the gods. With the development of the Roman Empire and its efficient road transport, pie cooking spread throughout Europe. Wealthy Romans combined many types of meats in their pies, including mussels and other seafood. Roman pie makers generally used vegetable oils, such as olive oil, to make their dough.

=== Medieval era ===
In the Medieval era, pies were usually savoury meat pies made with "...beef, lamb, wild duck, magpie pigeon -- spiced with pepper, currants or dates". Medieval cooks had restricted access to ovens due to their costs of construction and need for abundant supplies of fuel. Since pies could be easily cooked over an open fire, this made pies easier for most cooks to make. At the same time, by partnering with a baker, a cook could focus on preparing the filling.

The earliest pastry doughs were probably an inedible, stiff mixture of rye flour and water. The earliest pie recipes refer to huff paste or coffyns (the word actually used for a basket or box), with straight sealed sides and a top; open-top pies were called traps. Until the mid-16th century this British pastry dough known as "cofyn" was used as a baking dish. These pies were meant to be eaten with the hands. The hardened coffyn pastry was not necessarily eaten, its function being to contain the filling for baking, and to extend its shelf-life. The thick crust was so sturdy it had to be cracked open to get to the filling. This may also be the reason why early recipes focus on the filling over the surrounding case, with this development leading to the use of reusable earthenware pie cases which reduced the use of expensive flour. Ceramic pie dishes were not used until the 16th century. Medieval pastry was often baked first, to create a "pot" of baked dough with a removable top crust, hence the name pot pie.

The first unequivocal reference to pie in a written source is in the 14th century (Oxford English Dictionary sb pie). The eating of mince pies during festive periods is a tradition that dates back to the 13th century, as the returning Crusaders brought pie recipes containing "meats, fruits and spices". Some pies contained cooked rabbits, frogs, crows, and pigeons.

In 1390, the English cookbook A Forme of Cury had a recipe for "tartes of flesh", which included a ground-up mixture of "pork, hard-boiled eggs, and cheese" blended with "spices, saffron, and sugar". The "cofyn" dough for the 14th-century apple pie recipe from The Forme of Cury was probably a simple mix of water and whatever flour was available in the late Middle Ages. The recipe included spices, apples, raisins pears and figs. The 14th-century French chef Taillevent instructed bakers to "crenelate" pie shells and "reinforce them so that they can support the meat"; one of his pies was high enough that it resembled a model of a castle, an illusion enhanced by miniature banners for the nobles at the event.

Pies in the 15th century included birds, as song birds at the time were a delicacy and protected by Royal Law. At the coronation of eight-year-old English King Henry VI (1422–1461) in 1429, "Partrich" and "Pecok enhakill" were served, alleged by some modern writers to consist of cooked peacock mounted in its skin on a peacock-filled pie. The expressions "eat crow" and "four and 20 blackbirds" are sayings from the era when crow and blackbirds were eaten in pies. Cooked birds were frequently placed by European royal cooks on top of a large pie to identify its contents, leading to its later adaptation in pre-Victorian times as a porcelain ornament to release of steam. The apple pie was first referenced in writing in 1589, when the poet R. Green wrote "Thy breath is like the seeme of apple pies".

Medieval England had an early form of sweet pies called tarts and fruit pies were unsweetened, because sugar was a rare and costly status symbol.

=== 15th to 17th centuries ===
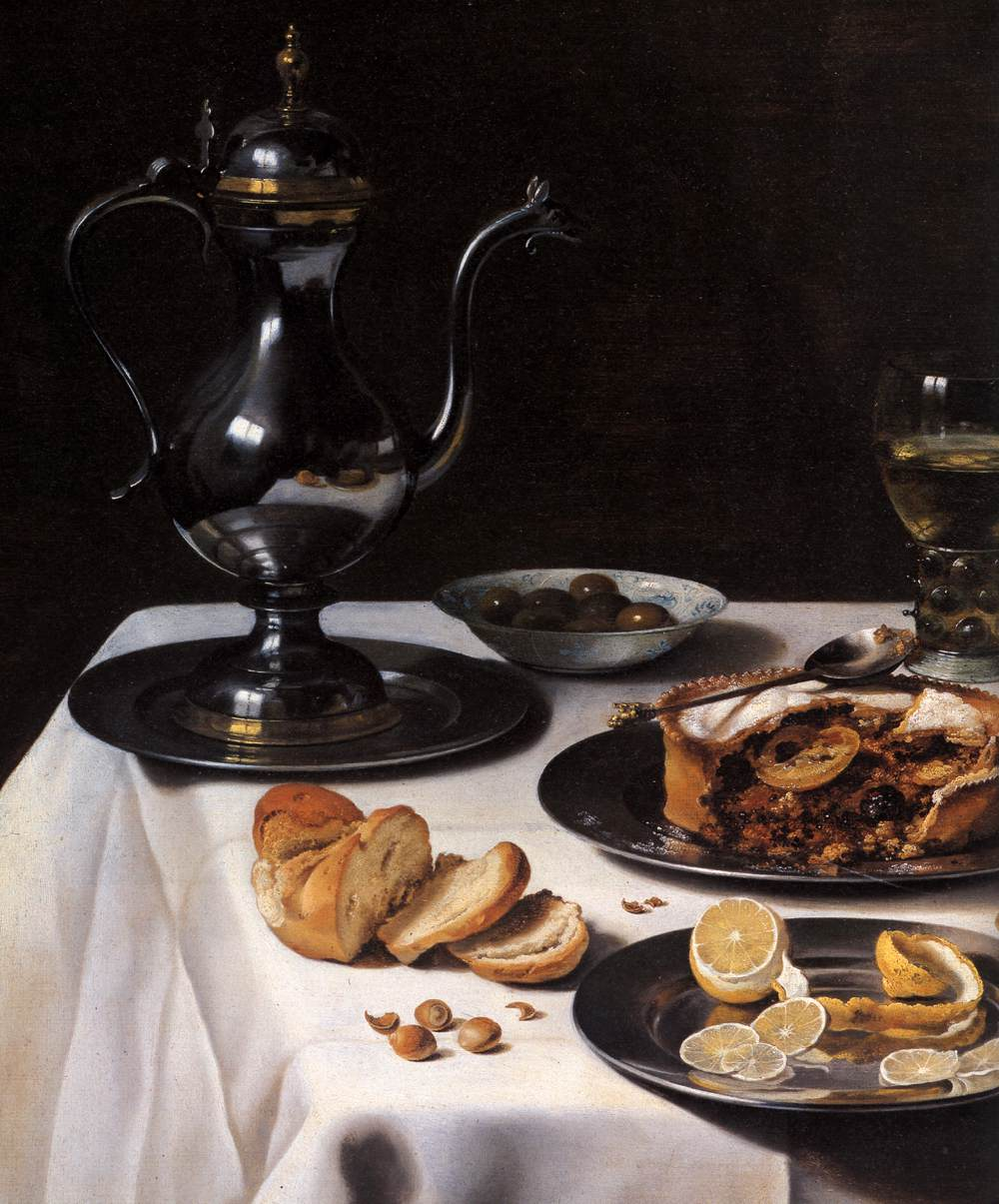
A detail from Pieter Claesz' 1627 painting of turkey pie.

Until the start of the 15th century, most pies were expected to contain meat or fish. Fresh fruit did not become widely used until sugar dropped in price during the 16th century due to the extensive use of slavery in sugar plantations. The first cherry pie is recorded in the late 16th century, when Queen Elizabeth I was served cherry pie. Elizabeth was often given gifts of quince or pear pies for New Year.

During the Shakespearean era, fruit pies were served hot, but others were served at room temperature, as they would be brought to the "...table more than once". Apple pies were popular in Tudor and Stuart times. Pippins were baked with cloves, cinnamon, dates and candied orange peels. Rosewater was often added to apple pies.

During the Puritan era of Oliver Cromwell, some sources claim mince pie eating was banned as a frivolous activity for 16 years, so mince pie making and eating became an underground activity; the ban was lifted in 1660, with the Restoration of the monarchy. Food historian Annie Gray suggests that the myth of the Puritans "actively" banning mince pies came about "due to the defenders of Christmas" who reported Puritan vitriol "with a certain amount of exaggeration".

It was in the 16th century that a puff paste began to be used to make flakier pies. In Gervase Markham's 1615 book The English Huswife, there is a recipe for puff paste where the paste is kneaded, rolled thinly many times while layering with butter. This made a flaky butter pastry to cover meat for pies or for tarts. There is also a pie recipe that calls for "an entire leg of mutton and three pounds of suet..., along with salt, cloves, mace, currants, raisins, prunes, dates, and orange peel", which made a huge pie that could serve a large group. According to Markham, pastry made with fine wheat flour required the addition of eggs to be sturdy enough for raised pies.

In the 17th century, Ben Jonson described a skilled pie cook by comparing the cook to a fortification builder who "...Makes citadels of curious fowl and fish" and makes "dry-ditches", "bulwark pies" and "ramparts of immortal crusts".

=== 18th century ===
In the Georgian era, sweetened pies of meat and dried fruits began to become less popular. In recipe books of the period sweet veal, sweet lamb or sweet chicken pies are given alongside recipes for unsweetened alternatives with the same ingredients made for those who could "no longer stomach the sweetened flesh meats enjoyed by earlier generations".

Pumpkin pie was fashionable in England from the 1650s onward, then fell out of favour during the 18th century. Pumpkin was sliced, fried with sweet herbs sweetened with sugar and eggs were added. This was put into a pastry case with currants and apples. Pumpkin pie was introduced to America by early colonists where it became a national dish.

=== 19th century ===
During the 19th century, pies became, according to food historian Janet Clarkson, "universally esteemed" in a way that other foods were not. In 1806 Mrs Rundell in her Observations on Savoury Pies in A New System of Domestic Cookery stated that 'There are few articles of cookery more generally liked than relishing pies, if properly made'. Alexis Soyer, a celebrity cook of the 19th century said in his book Shilling Cookery for the People (1860) "From childhood we eat pies - from girlhood to boyhood we eat pies - in fact, pies in England may be considered as one of our best companions du voyage through life. It is we who leave them behind, not they who leave us; for our children and grandchildren will be as fond of pies as we have been; therefore it is needful that we should learn how to make them, and make them well! Believe me, I am not jesting, but if all the spoilt pies made in London on one single Sunday were to be exhibited in a row beside a railway line, it would take above an hour by special train to pass in review these culinary victims".

=== United States (17th century–1980s) ===
The Pilgrims brought the pie recipes they knew from their home countries with them when they arrived to the colonies. Colonists appreciated the food preservation aspect of crusty-topped pies from Britain, which were often seasoned with "dried fruit, cinnamon, pepper and nutmeg". The first pies they created in the United states were adapted pies that were based on berries and fruits pointed out to them by the Native North Americans.

According to James E. McWilliams, American cooks "embraced the rough edges of American foodways to foster a pastoral ideal that promoted the frontier values that the colonists had once downplayed". Apple pie became popular, because apples were easy to dry and store in barrels over the winter.

Pie fillings could be made with very few ingredients to "stretch" their "meager provisions". These pies later came to be known as desperation pies. First originating in the 18th century they included pies like sugar cream pie and Kentucky transparent pie. By the 19th century pies were a staple of the American family meal and women were responsible for figuring out how to make tasty pies that fit within the family budget.

Once the British had established Caribbean colonies, sugar became less expensive and more widely available, which meant that sweet pies could be readily made. Molasses was popular in American pies due to the rum and slave trade with the Caribbean Islands, and maple syrup was an important sweetener in Northern states, after Indigenous people taught settlers how to tap maple trees and boil down the sap. In the Midwest, cheese and cream pies were popular, due to the availability of big dairy farms. In the US south, African-Americans enjoyed sweet potato pies, due to the widespread availability of this type of potato.

By the 1870s, the new science of nutrition led to criticism of pies, notably by Sarah Tyson Rorer, a cooking teacher and food editor who warned the public about how much energy pies take to digest. Rorer stated that all pie crusts "...are to be condemned" and her cookbook only included an apple tart, jelly and meringue-covered crackers, pâté, and a "hygienic pie" which had "apple slices or a pumpkin custard baked in biscuit dough". In 1866, Harper's Magazine included an article by C.W. Gesner that stated that although we "...cry for pie when we are infants", "Pie kills us finally", as the "heavy crust" cannot be digested.

Another factor that decreased the popularity of pies was industrialisation and increasing movement of women into the labour market, which changed pie making from a weekly ritual to an "occasional undertaking" on special occasions. In the 1950s, after WWII, the popularity of pies rebounded in the US, especially with commercial food inventions such as instant pudding mixes, Cool Whip topping, and Jello gelatin (which could be used as fillings) ready-made crusts, which were sold frozen, and alternative crusts made with crushed potato chips. There was a pie renaissance in the 1980s, when old-fashioned pie recipes were rediscovered and a wide range of cross-cultural pies were explored.

== Regional variations ==
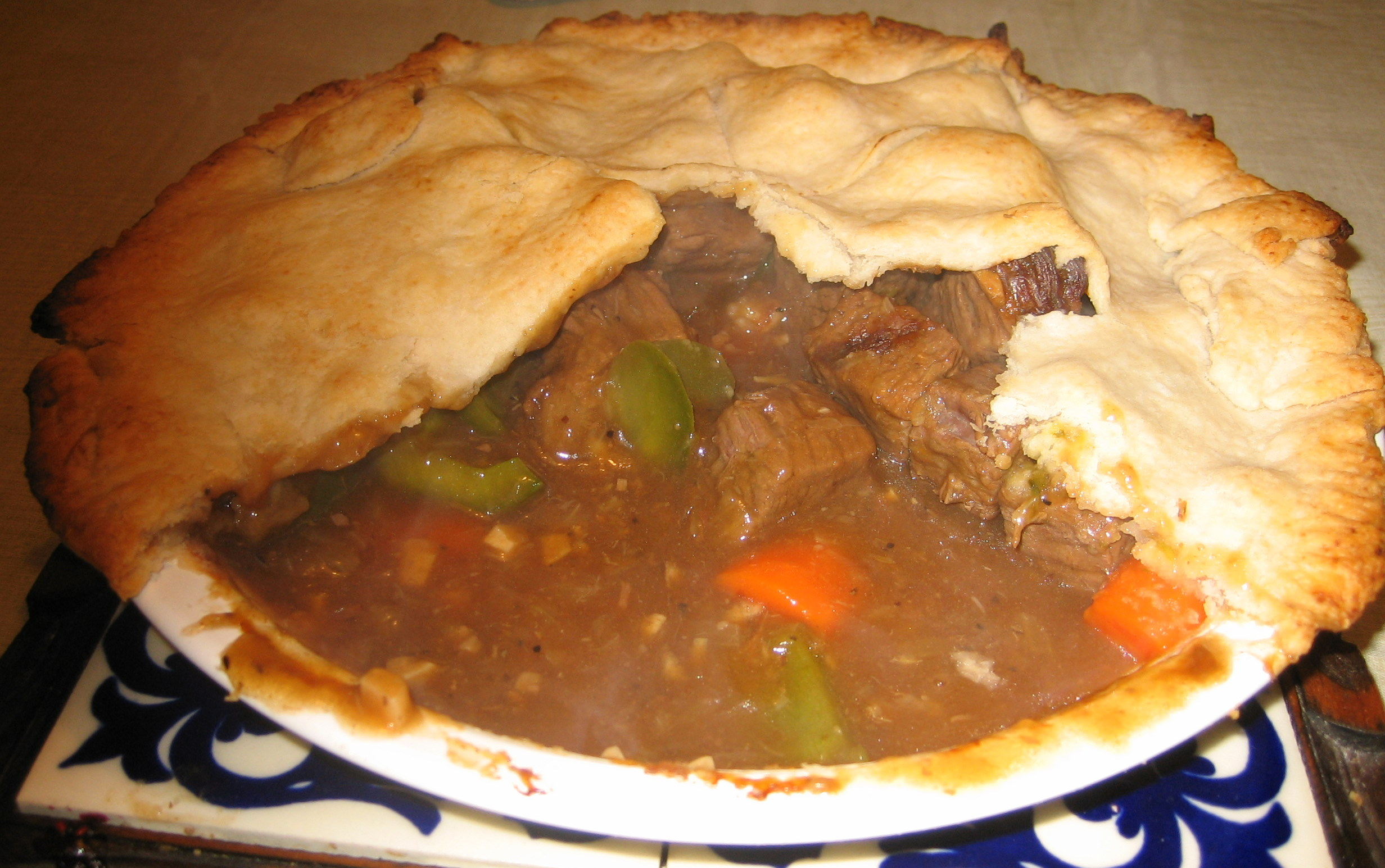
Homemade meat pie with beef and vegetables.

Meat pies with fillings such as steak, cheese, steak and kidney, beef and ale, lamb and mint, minced beef, or chicken and mushroom are popular in the United Kingdom, Australia, South Africa and New Zealand as take-away snacks. They are also served with chips as an alternative to fish and chips at British chip shops.

Pies with a flaky crust and bottom are also a popular dish in North America, typically with a filling of meat (particularly beef, chicken, or turkey), gravy, and mixed vegetables (potatoes, carrots, and peas). Frozen pot pies are often sold in individual serving size.

Fruit pies may be served with a scoop of ice cream, a style known in North America as pie à la mode. Many sweet pies are served this way. This combination, and possibly the name as well, is thought to have been popularised in the mid-1890s in the United States. Cream and custard are other popular serving suggestions.

In Eastern Europe and the Middle East, Filo pastry based pies such as Börek, Banitsa and Spanakopita are popular. In Vietnam, Pâté chaud is a puff pastry savoury meat pie.

In South America, Argentina has the savoury pastry based Tarta pascualina and the potato topped Pastel de Papas.

== In literature ==
Cold pigeon pies and venison pasties appear in novels by Jane Austen, but also more generally in writing in the 18th century. The character Mrs Elton, from the 1815 novel Emma, believes herself to be modern, but nevertheless plans to take 'pigeon-pies and cold lamb' to a country outing to Box Hill and consults George Turberville's 1575 work The Noble Art of Venerie (1575) for advice.

In the 1817 novel Persuasion, Jane Austen includes pies in her description of an old-fashioned Christmas spread, mentioning 'tressels and trays, bending under the weight of brawn and cold pies'. In the whole of Persuasion, brawn and cold pies are the only specific mention of food; they are also the only Christmas foods to be mentioned in any of Jane Austen's novels.

== In popular culture ==
In the United States, a popular idiom is "American as apple pie". There pie, especially apple pie, became intertwined to the point that in 1902, The New York Times asserted that "pie is the food of the heroic" and "no pie-eating people can ever be permanently vanquished". However, The Washington Post said the phrase "as American as apple pie" should really be ""as American as a cobbler".

The slang expression "to eat humble pie" comes from the umble pie, which was made with chopped animal offal. "It's a piece of pie", meaning that something is easy, dates from 1889. "Pie-eyed", meaning drunk, dates from 1904. The expression "pie in the sky", to refer to an unlikely proposal or idea, comes from "The Preacher and the Slave", a 1911 Joe Hill song.

=== Pie throwing ===
Cream filled or topped pies are favourite props for slapstick humour. Throwing a pie in a person's face has been a staple of film comedy since Ben Turpin received one in Mr. Flip in 1909. More recently, pieing has also become a political act; some activists throw cream pies at politicians and other public figures as a form of protest.

== Types ==
=== Savoury ===
- Bacon and egg pie
- Butter pie
- Cheese and onion pie
- Chicken and mushroom pie
- Corned beef pie
- Curry pie
- Game pie
- Fish pie
- Flipper pie
- Homity pie
- Meat pie
- Meat and potato pie
- Pâté chinois
- Pork pie
- Pot pie
- Quiche
- Rabbit pie
- Scotch pie
- Shepherd's pie
- Stargazy pie
- Steak pie
- Steak and kidney pie
- Tourtière
Savoury pies

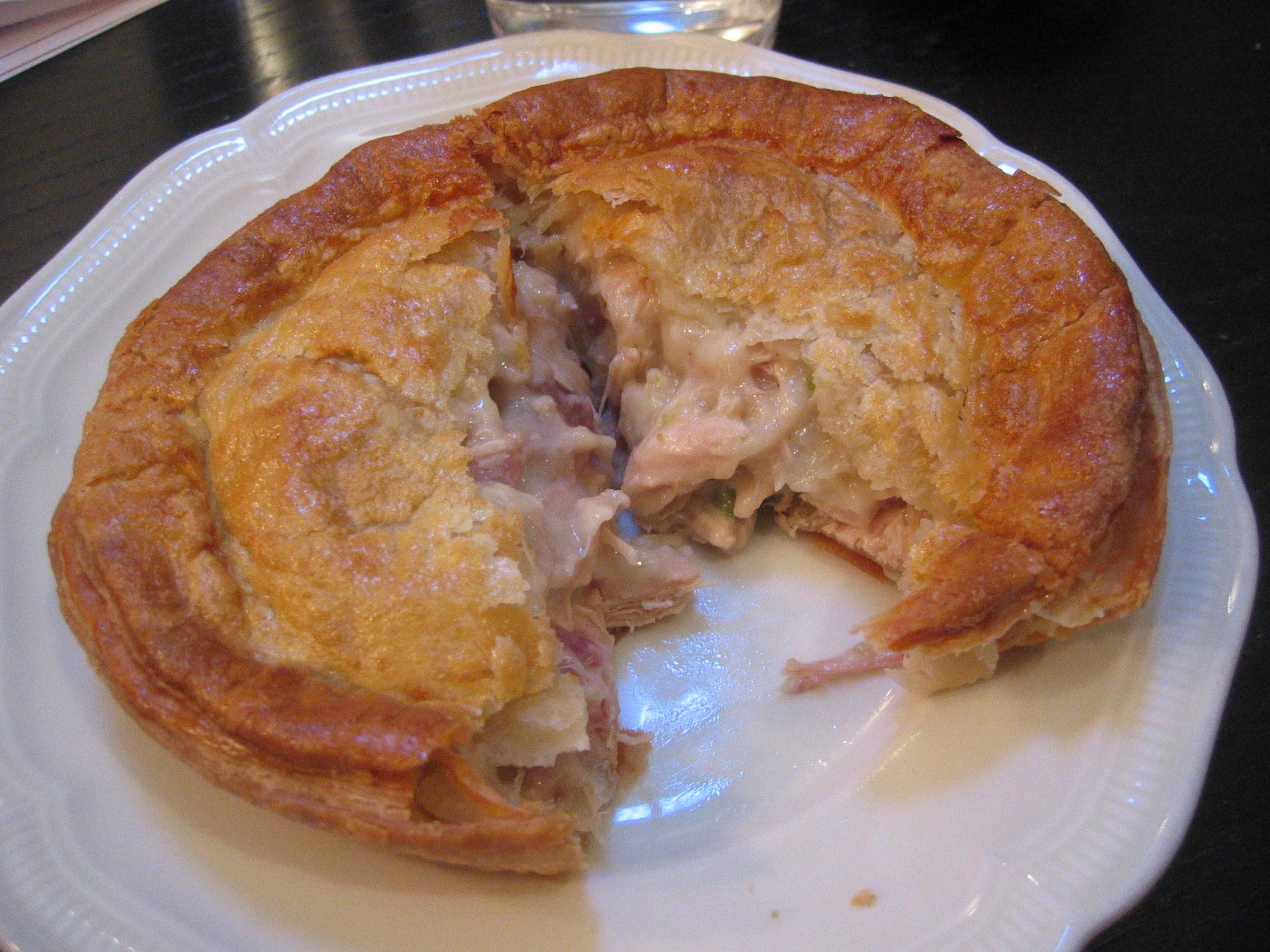
A chicken and lamb pie

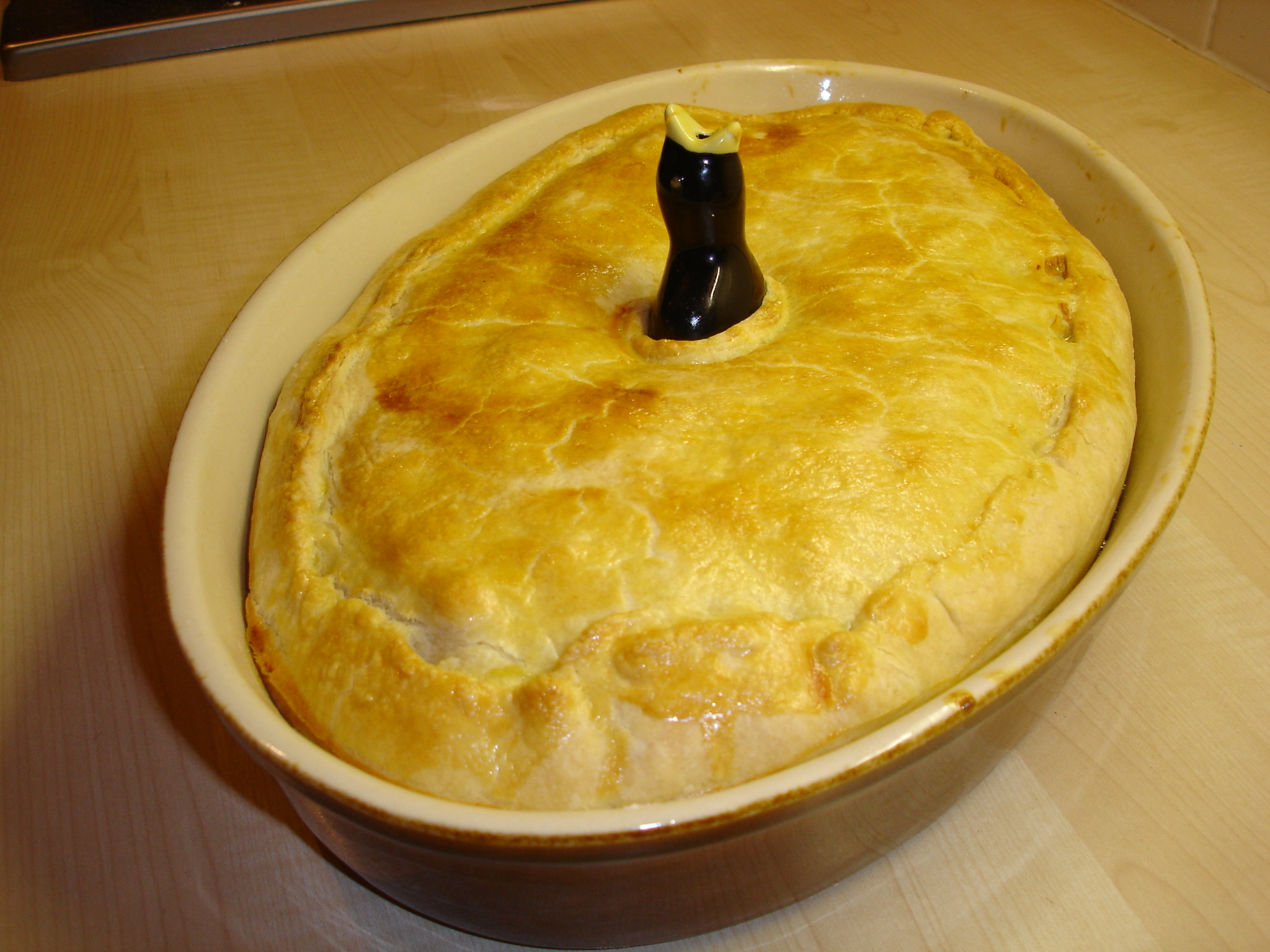
A chicken pie with a traditional pie bird

=== Sweet ===
- Black bottom pie
- Buko pie
- Bundevara
- Cashew pie
- Chess pie
- Chestnut pie
- Chiffon pie
- Cream pie
- Custard pie
- Egg pie
- Milk pie
- Peanut pie
- Pecan pie
- Pumpkin pie
- Shoofly pie
- Sweet potato pie
- Tarte au sucre
- Turtle pie
- Walnut pie
Sweet pies

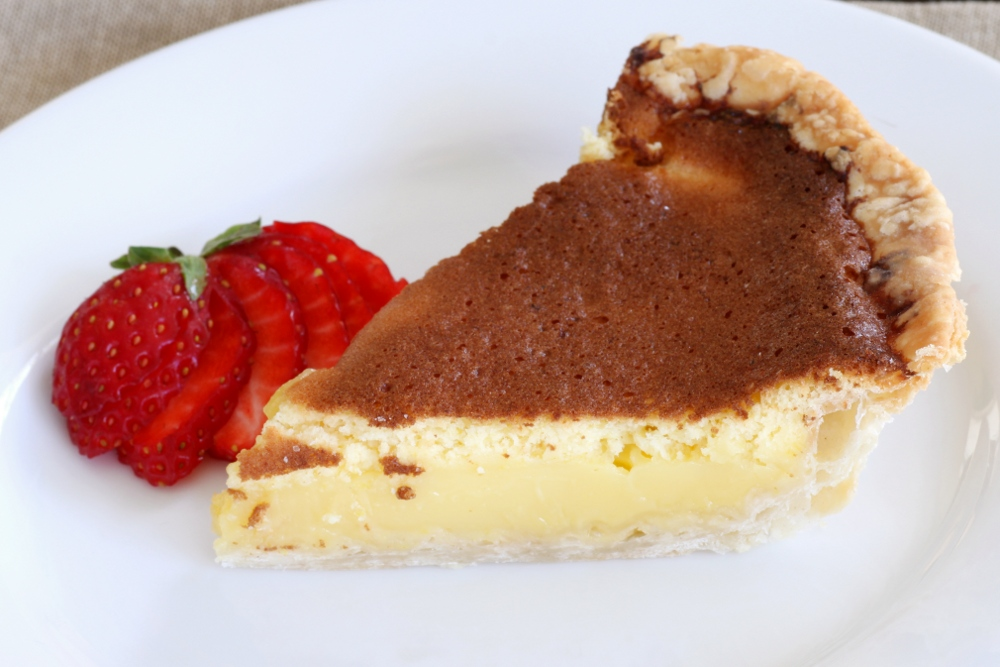
A slice of chess pie

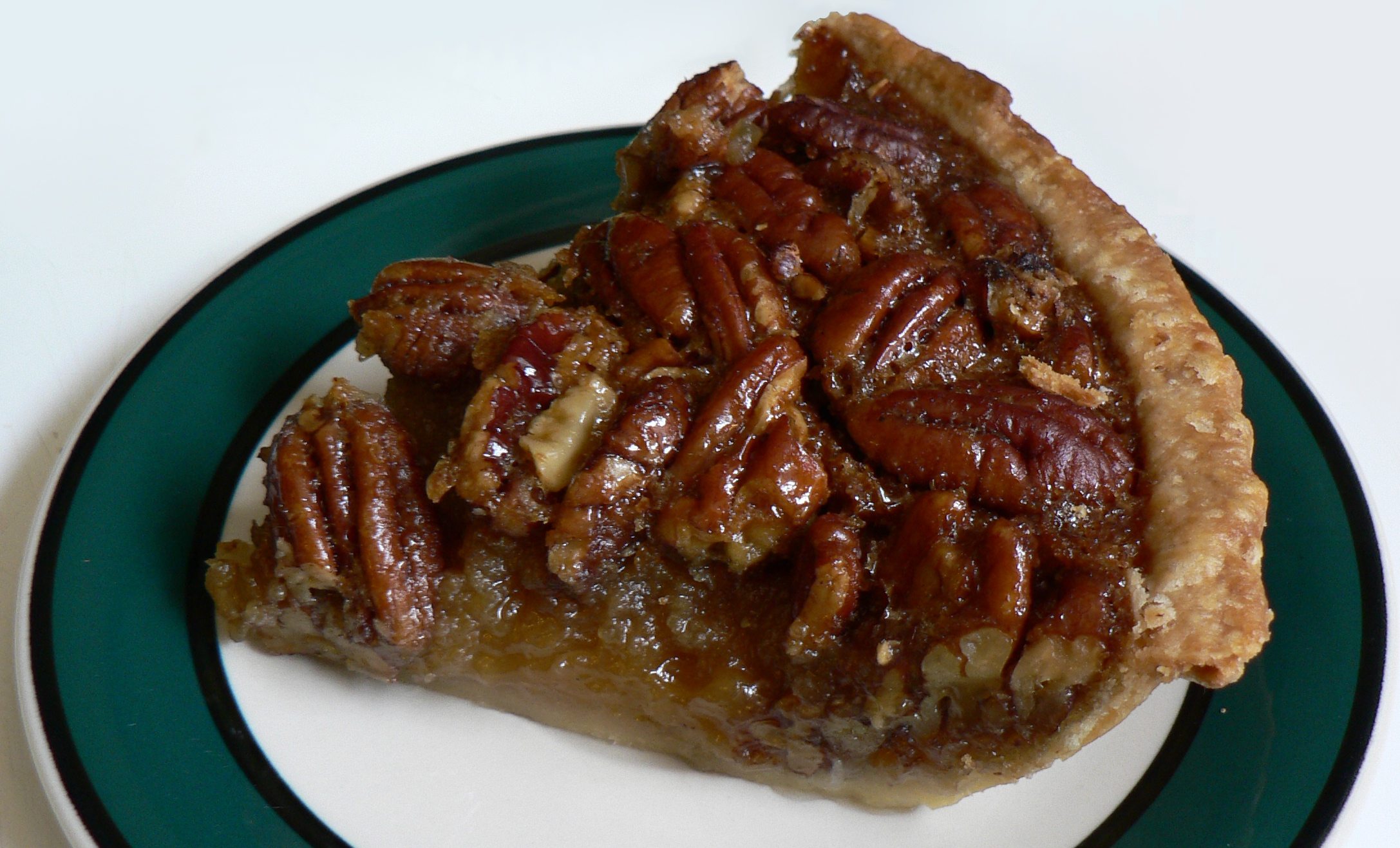
A slice of pecan pie

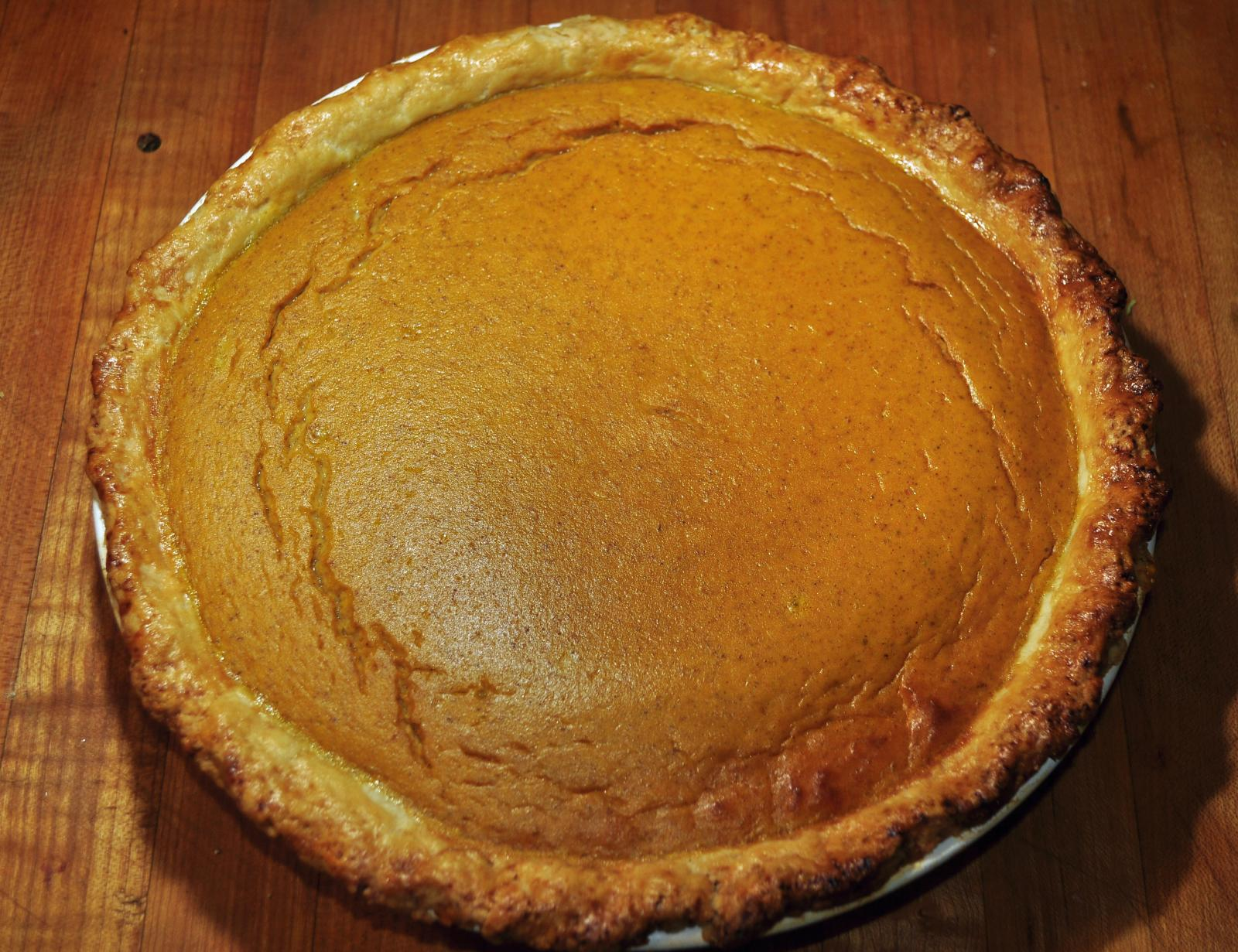
Pumpkin pie showing texture of surface

=== Fruit ===
Many fruit and berry pies are very similar, varying only the fruit used in filling. Fillings for sweet or fruity are often mixed, such as strawberry rhubarb pie.

- Apple pie
- Banoffee pie – named for the combination of bananas and toffee
- Blackberry pie
- Blueberry pie
- Cherry pie
- Key lime pie
- Lemon pie
- Lemon meringue pie
- Mince pie – although formerly made with finely minced meat, it is now made with fruit
- Rhubarb pie
- Saskatoonberry pie
- Strawberry pie
Sweet pies

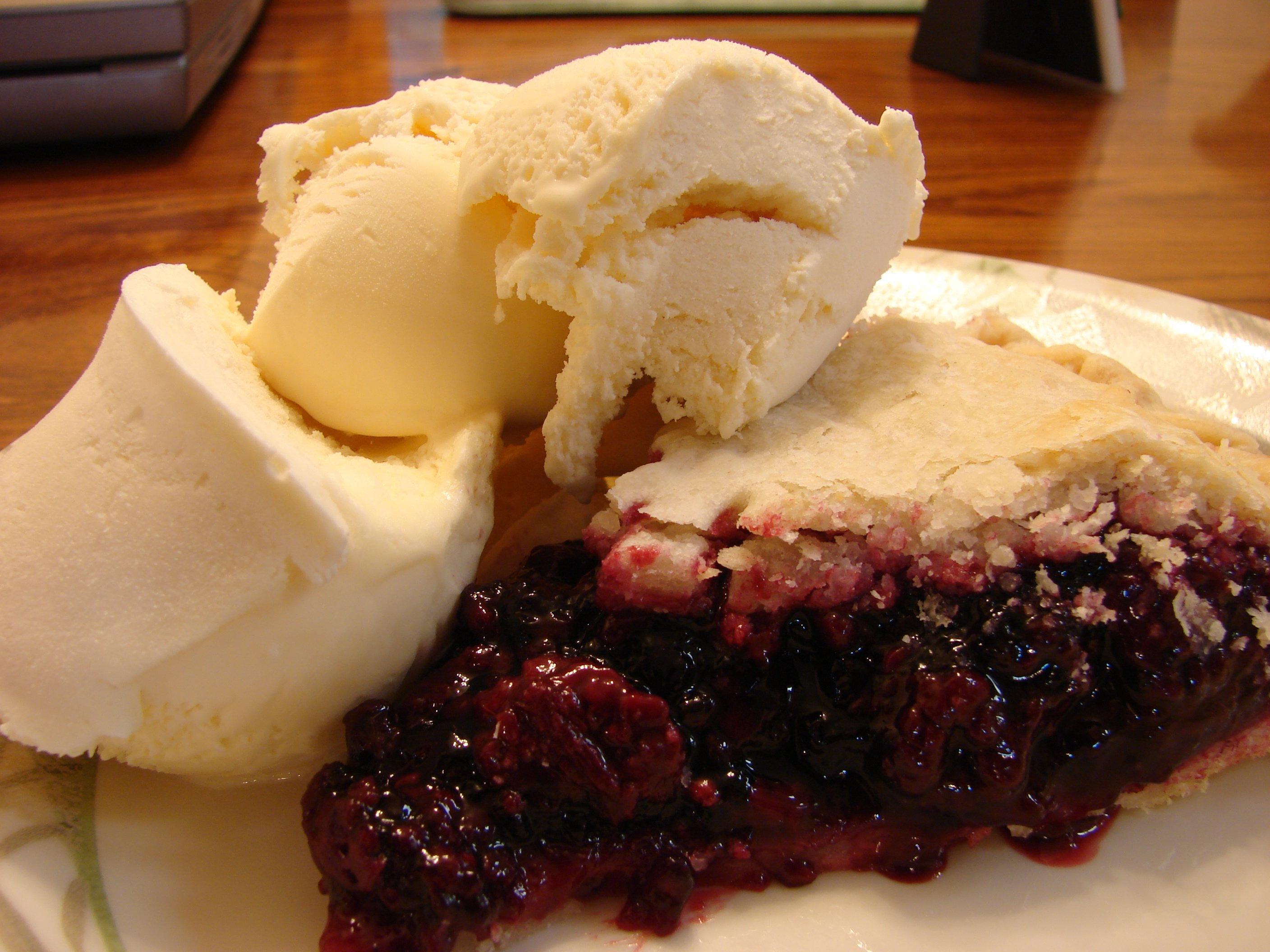
Blackberry pie with ice cream

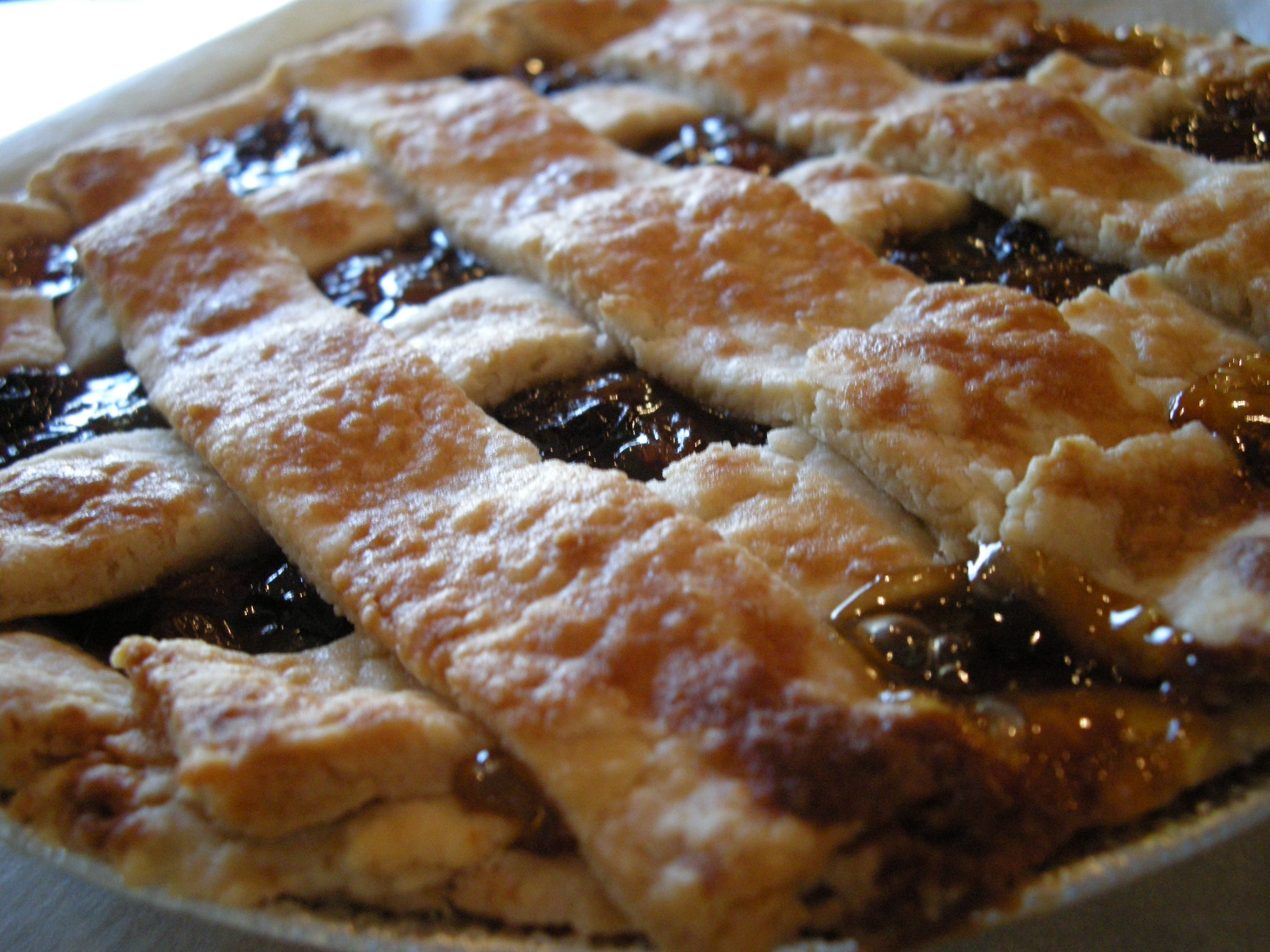
Raisin pie with a lattice-style crust

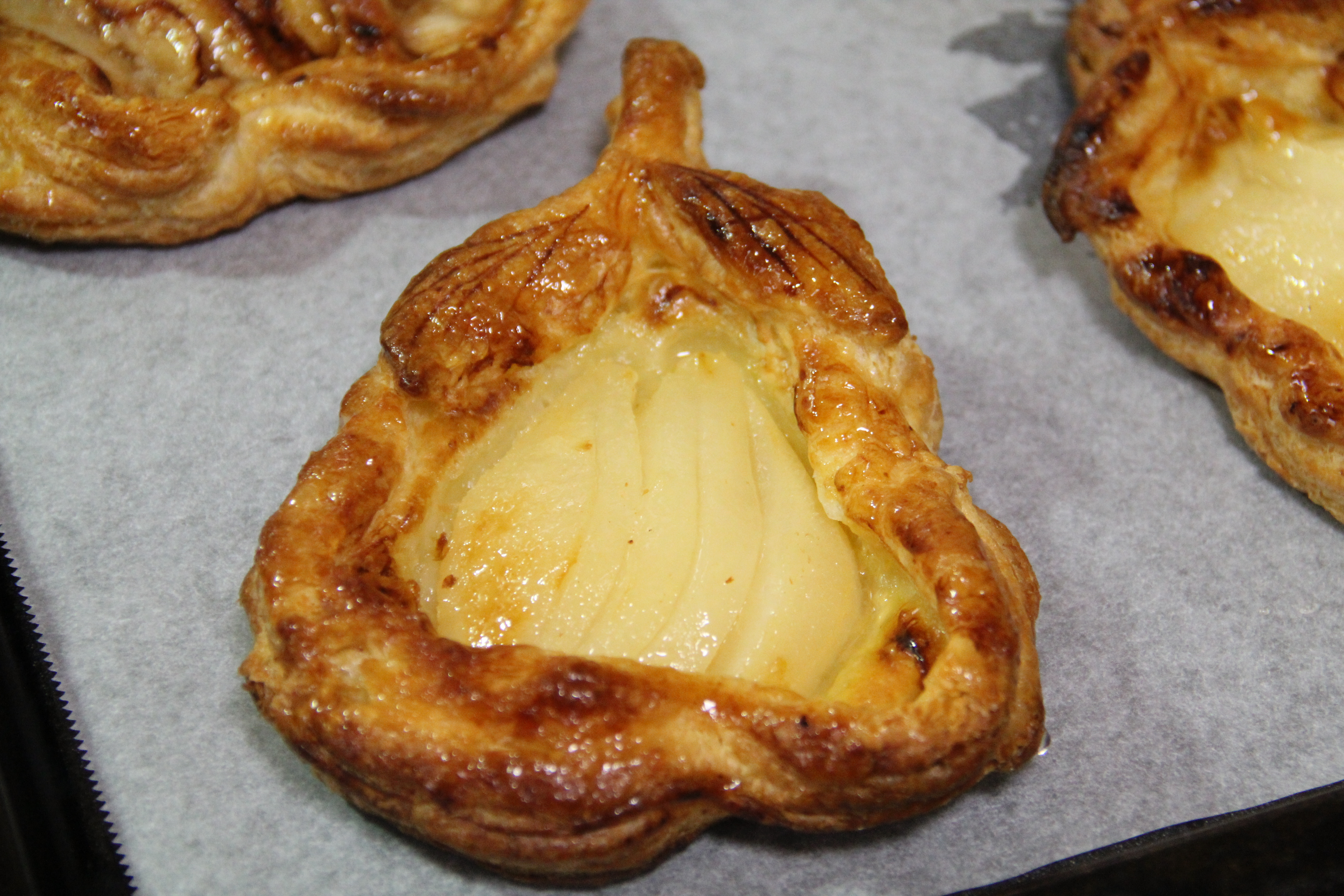
Pear-shaped pear pie with puff pastry

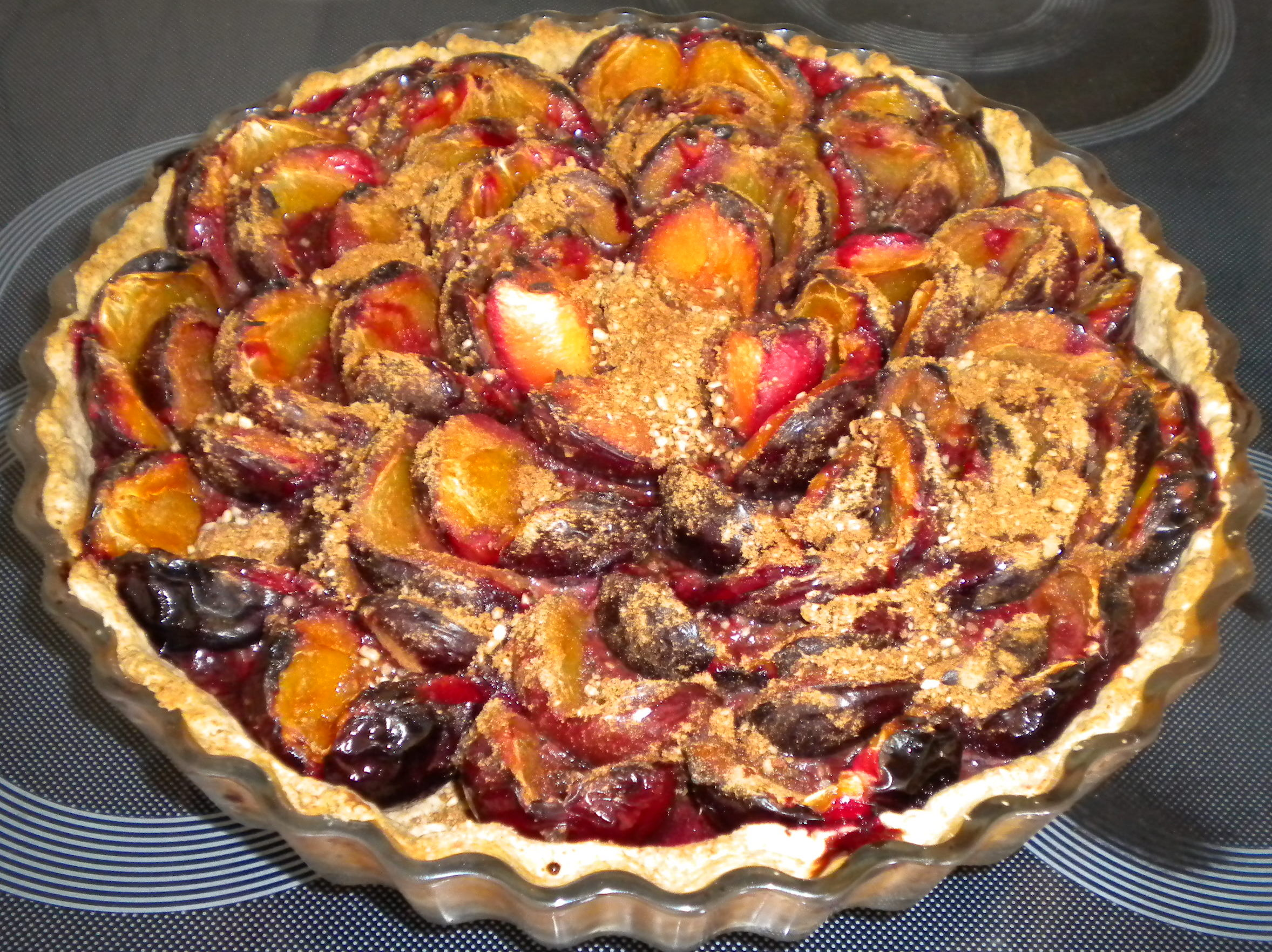
Jeûne Genevois plum pie

=== Other ===
- Fried pie – a smaller pie that is deep-fried instead of being baked; it can have any filling.
- Tart – a pie with no top crust, often filled with fruit

== See also ==
- American Pie Council
- Cobbler (food)
- Crostata
- Crumble
- Empanada
- List of baked goods
- List of desserts
- List of pies, tarts and flans
- Pirog
- Pirozhki
- Strudel
- Turnover
