= Bacon and egg pie =

Savoury pie

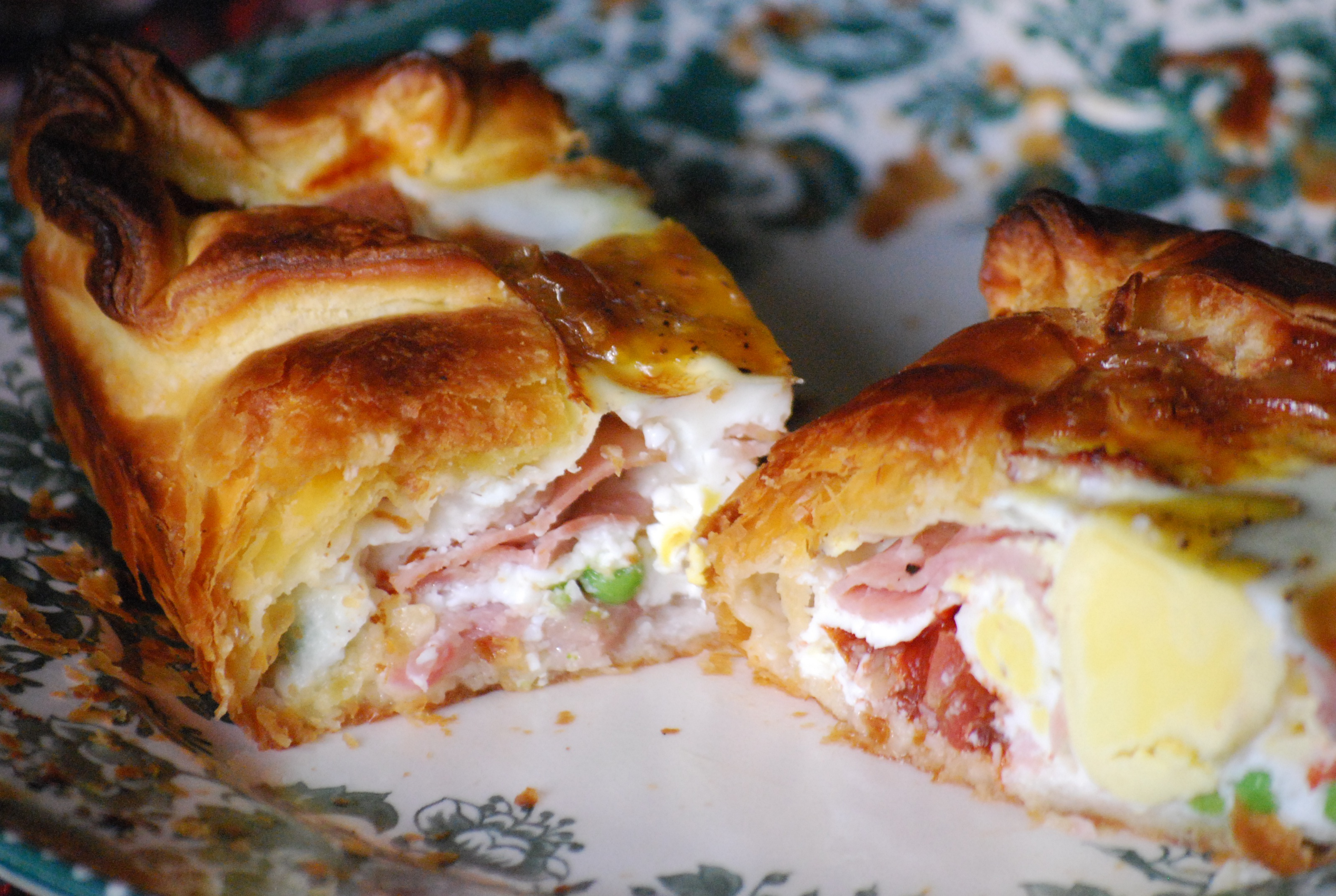
- Alternative names: Egg and bacon pie
- Type: Savoury pie
- Course: Breakfast, lunch, dinner, or as a snack
- Place of origin: England
- Serving temperature: Hot or cold
- Main ingredients: Shortcrust or other base crust, bacon, eggs
- Variations: Additional ingredients such as peas or tomatoes

The bacon and egg pie (also known as egg and bacon pie) is a British and commonwealth savoury pie consisting of a pastry crust containing bacon, egg and sometimes onion, mushrooms, bell peppers, peas, tomato, fresh herbs and cheese.

Bacon and egg pie may be served with ketchup, and some versions have a rising agent such as baking powder mixed into the egg to make a fluffier filling.

== Composition ==
The pie is often constructed with shortcrust pastry or other stable pastry base. The pie may be topped with a pastry lid, or left open.

A bacon and egg pie differs from a quiche, which is made with an egg custard.

Although the bacon and egg combination is not unique to any country, its use in modern cooking is notable in the United Kingdom, New Zealand, Canada and Australia. Recipes for it have been found as early as The Experienced English Housekeeper in 1769.

== See also ==
- Cornish pasty
- List of pies, tarts and flans
- Quiche
- Steak and kidney pie
- Bacon, egg and cheese sandwich
