= Corned beef pie =

Savoury pie

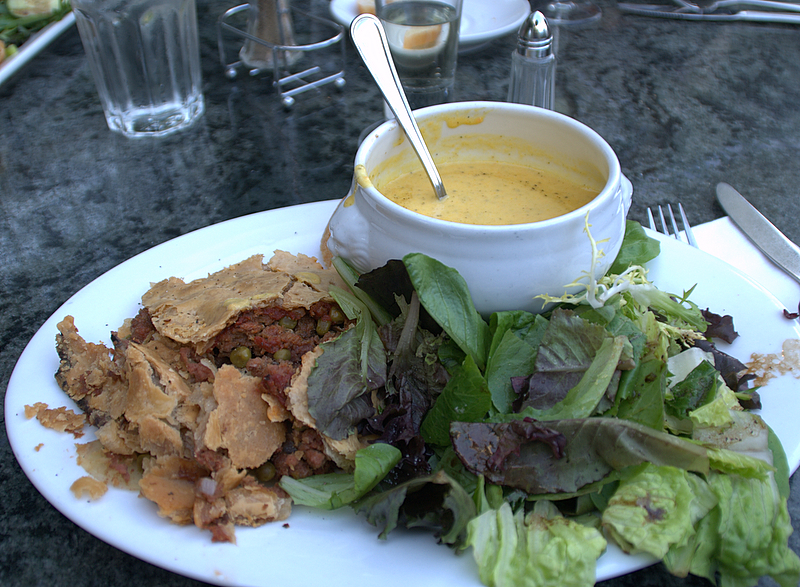
- Corned beef pie (left), served with cheddar soup and a salad
- Type: Savoury pie
- Place of origin: United Kingdom
- Serving temperature: Hot or cold
- Main ingredients: Corned beef, onion, potatoes

Corned beef pie is made from corned beef, onion and often thinly sliced, cubed or mashed potato. It can be eaten hot or cold, making it a suitable common picnic food and also a "winter warmer". The pie may be made with a mashed potato topping, as in Shepherd's pie, or with a traditional pastry crust. The recipe originated during World War I, when it was known as Trench Pie or Potato Pie.

== See also ==
- Cottage pie
- List of pies, tarts and flans
- List of potato dishes
- List of meat and potato dishes
