= Quiche =

French savory custard tart

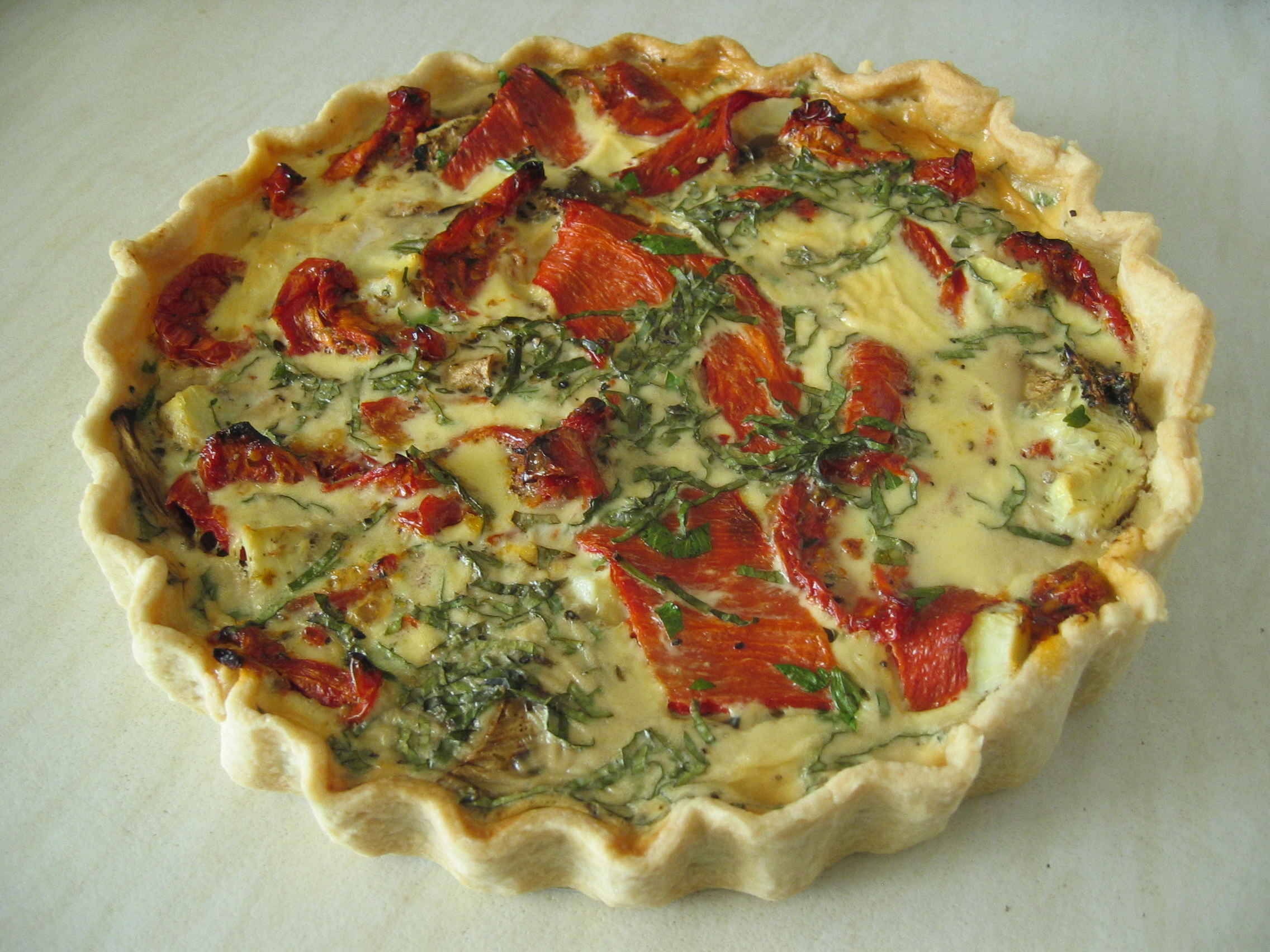
- A typical quiche
- Type: Tart
- Place of origin: France
- Main ingredients: Pastry case filled with egg and cheese, meat, seafood, or vegetables

Quiche (/ˈkiːʃ/ KEESH) is a French tart consisting of a pastry case filled with savory custard and pieces of cheese, meat, seafood or vegetables. A well-known variant is Quiche Lorraine, which includes lardons or bacon. Quiche are served hot, warm or cold.

== Overview ==
=== Etymology ===
The word is first attested in Lorrain in 1605, then in French in 1805; the first English usage "quiche lorraine" was recorded in 1925. The further etymology is uncertain, but it may be related to the German Kuchen meaning "cake" or "tart".

=== History ===
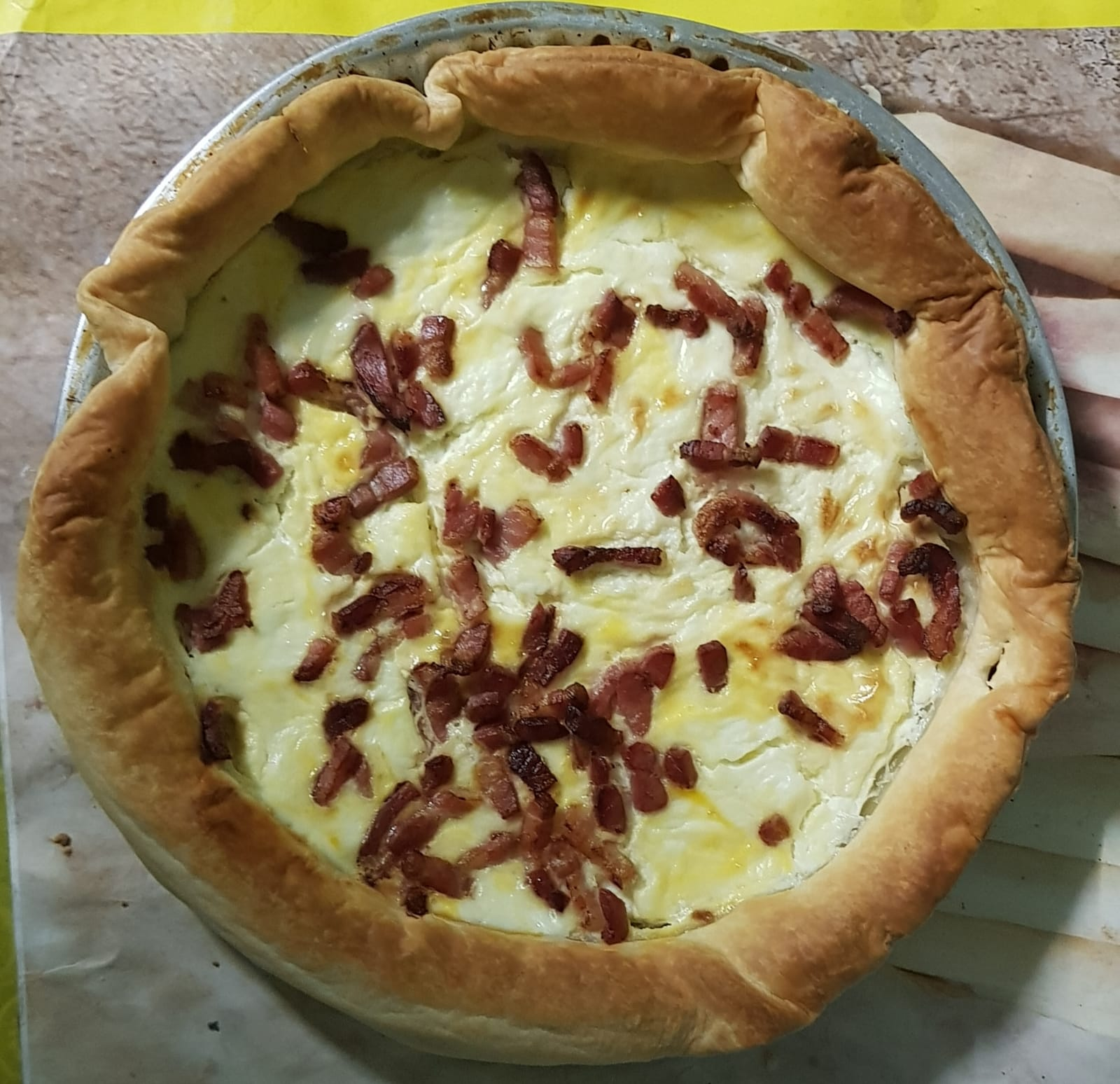
Quiche lorraine

Recipes for eggs and cream baked in pastry containing meat, fish, and fruit are referred to as Crustardes of flesh and Crustade in the 14th-century, English Cookbook, The Forme of Cury. There have been other local medieval preparations in Central Europe, from the east of France to Austria, that resemble quiche. In 1586, a quiche like dish was served at a dinner for Charles III, Duke of Lorraine. The 19th-century noun quiche was later given to a French dish originating from the eastern part of the country. It may derive from an older preparation called féouse typical in the city of Nancy in the 16th century. The early versions of quiche were made of bread dough but today shortcrust pastry and puff pastry are used.

The American writer and cookery teacher James Peterson recorded first encountering quiche in the late 1960s and being "convinced it was the most sophisticated and delicious thing [he had] ever tasted". He wrote that, by the 1980s, American quiches had begun to include ingredients he found "bizarre and unpleasant", such as broccoli, (Note: Peterson's noting his aversion to broccoli echoed earlier remarks by former President George H. W. Bush, who too notably did not like the vegetable.) and that he regarded Bruce Feirstein's satirical book Real Men Don't Eat Quiche (1982) as the "final humiliation" of the dish, such that "[a] rugged and honest country dish had become a symbol of effete snobbery".

== Varieties ==
A quiche usually has a pastry case and a filling of eggs with either milk, cream, or both. It may be made with vegetables, meat or seafood, and be served hot, warm or cold. Types of quiches include:

Name	Main ingredients	Ref.
Quiche au Camembert	Camembert cheese, cream, eggs	
Quiche aux champignons	Mushrooms, cream, eggs	
Quiche aux endives	Chicory, cream, eggs, cheese	
Quiche aux épinards	Spinach, cream, eggs	
Quiche au fromage de Gruyère	Gruyère cheese, cream, eggs, bacon	
Quiche au fromage blanc	Cream cheese, cream, eggs, bacon	
Quiche aux fruits de mer	Shrimp, crab or lobster, cream, eggs	
Quiche aux oignons	Onions, cream, eggs, cheese	
Quiche aux poireaux	Leeks, cream, eggs, cheese	
Quiche au Roquefort	Roquefort cheese, cream, eggs	
Quiche comtoise	Comté cheese, cream, eggs, smoked bacon	
Quiche Lorraine	Cream, eggs, bacon (Note: Some recipes add cheese, but the traditional Lorrain version does not.)	
Quiche niçoise, à la tomate	Anchovies, olives, tomatoes, eggs, Parmesan cheese	

In her French Country Cooking (1951), Elizabeth David gives a recipe for a quiche aux pommes de terre, in which the case is made not from shortcrust pastry but from mashed potato, flour and butter; the filling is cream, Gruyère and garlic.

== Gallery ==
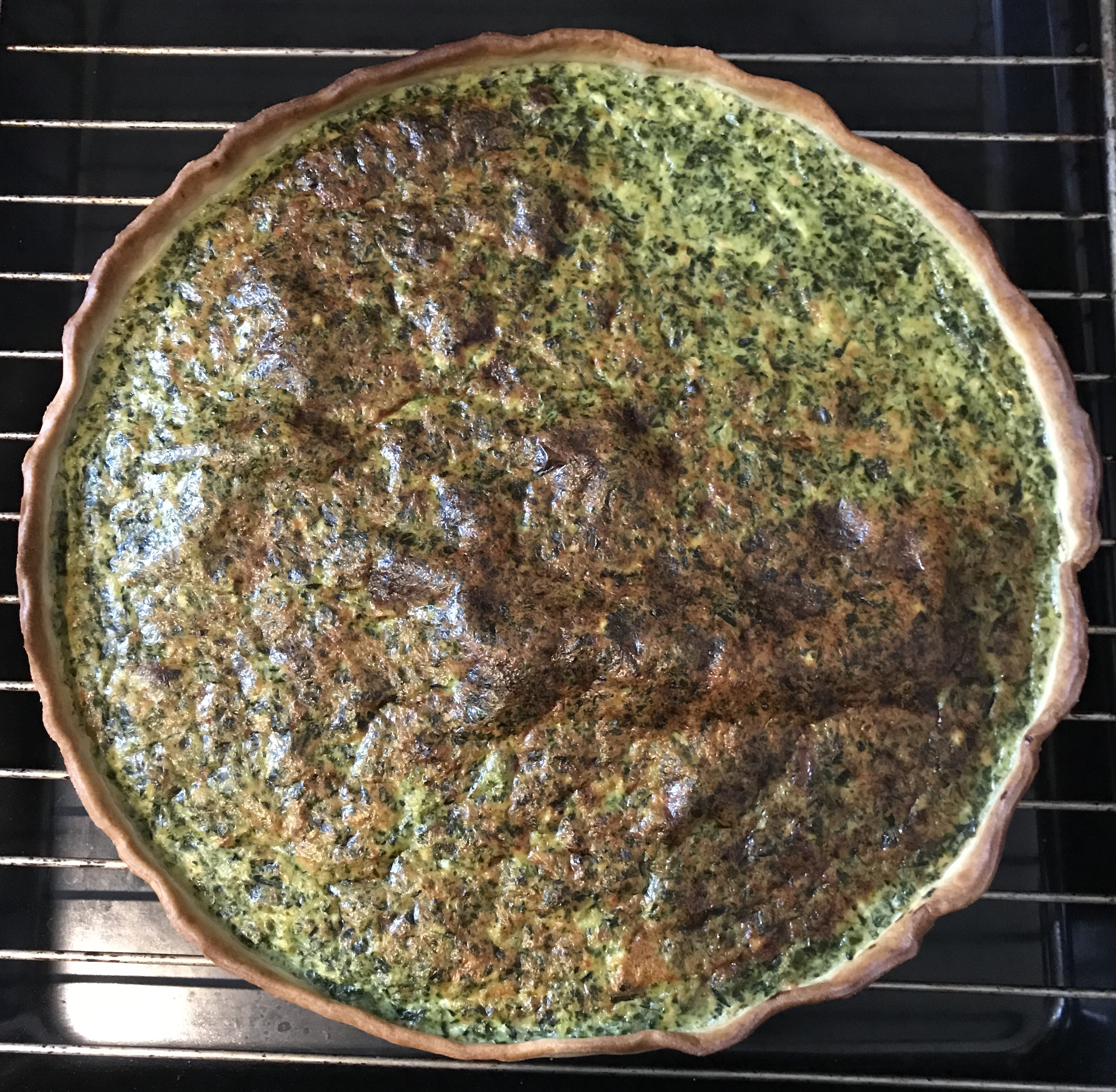
Salmon and spinach quiche

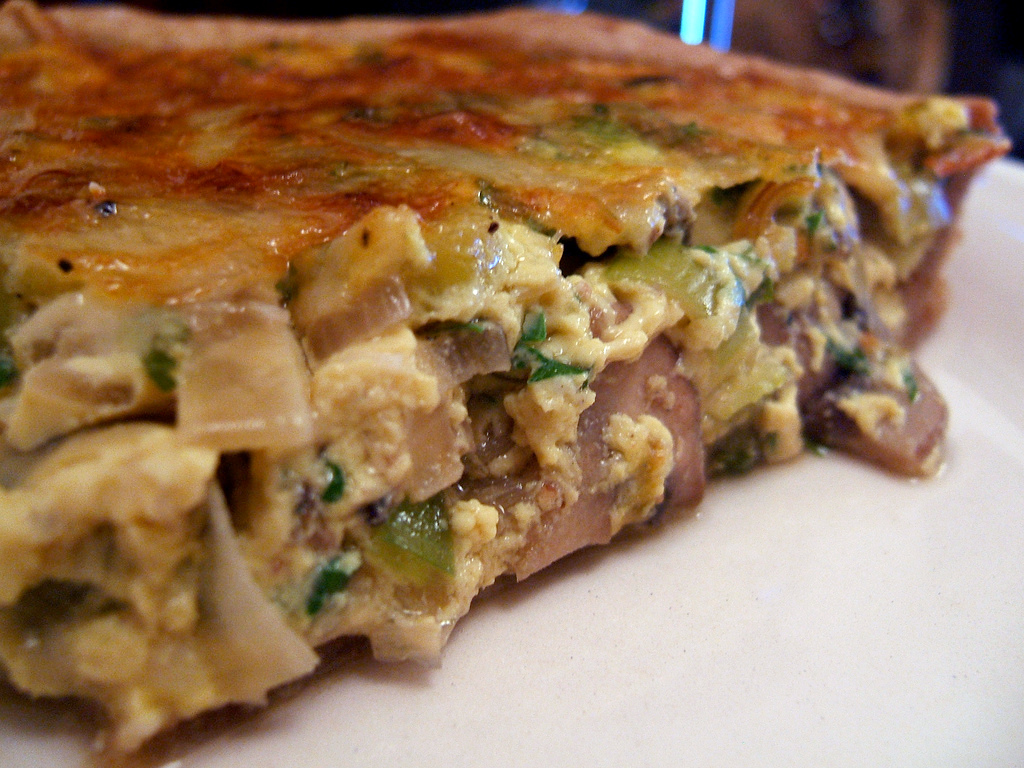
Leek and mushroom quiche

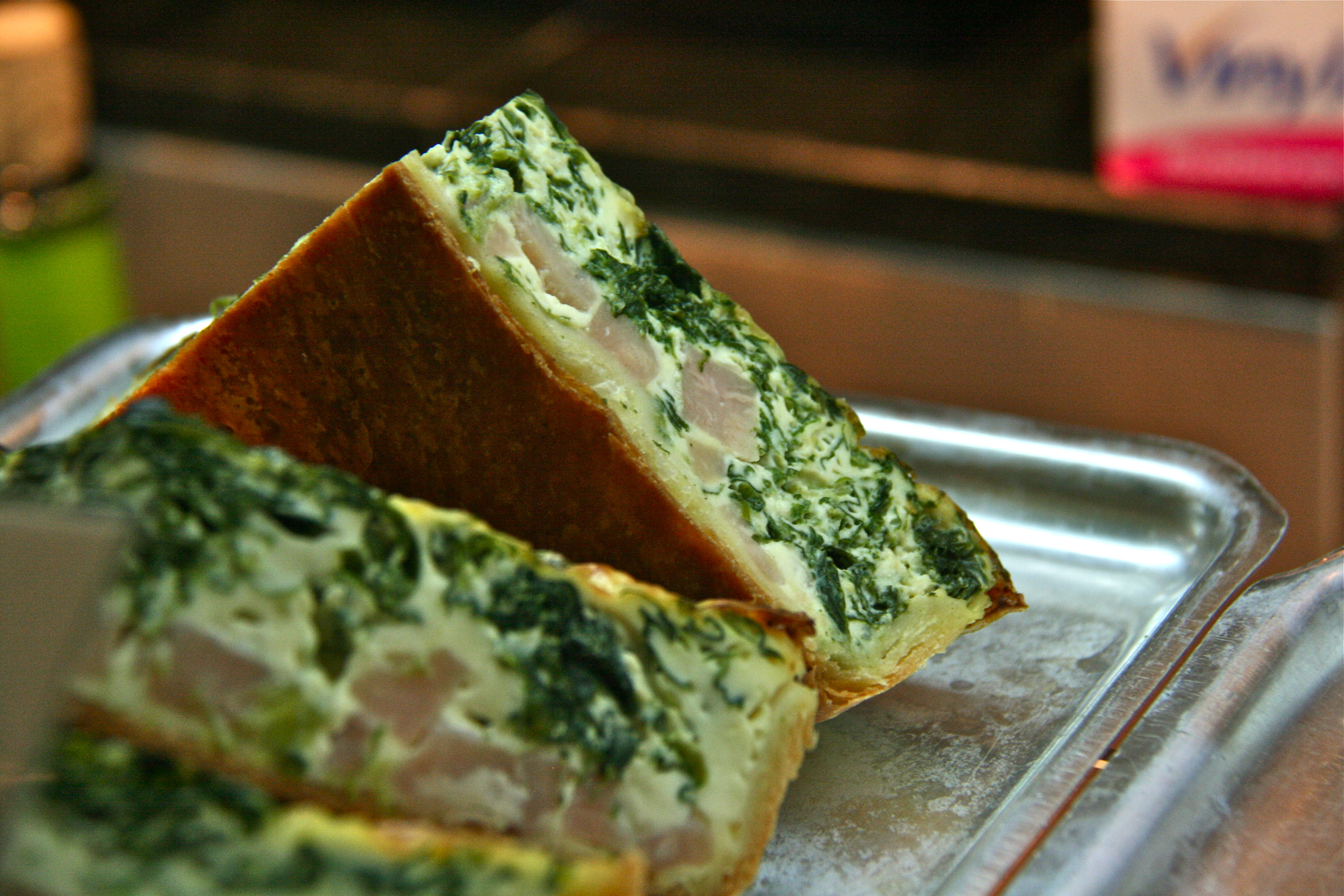
Spinach quiche

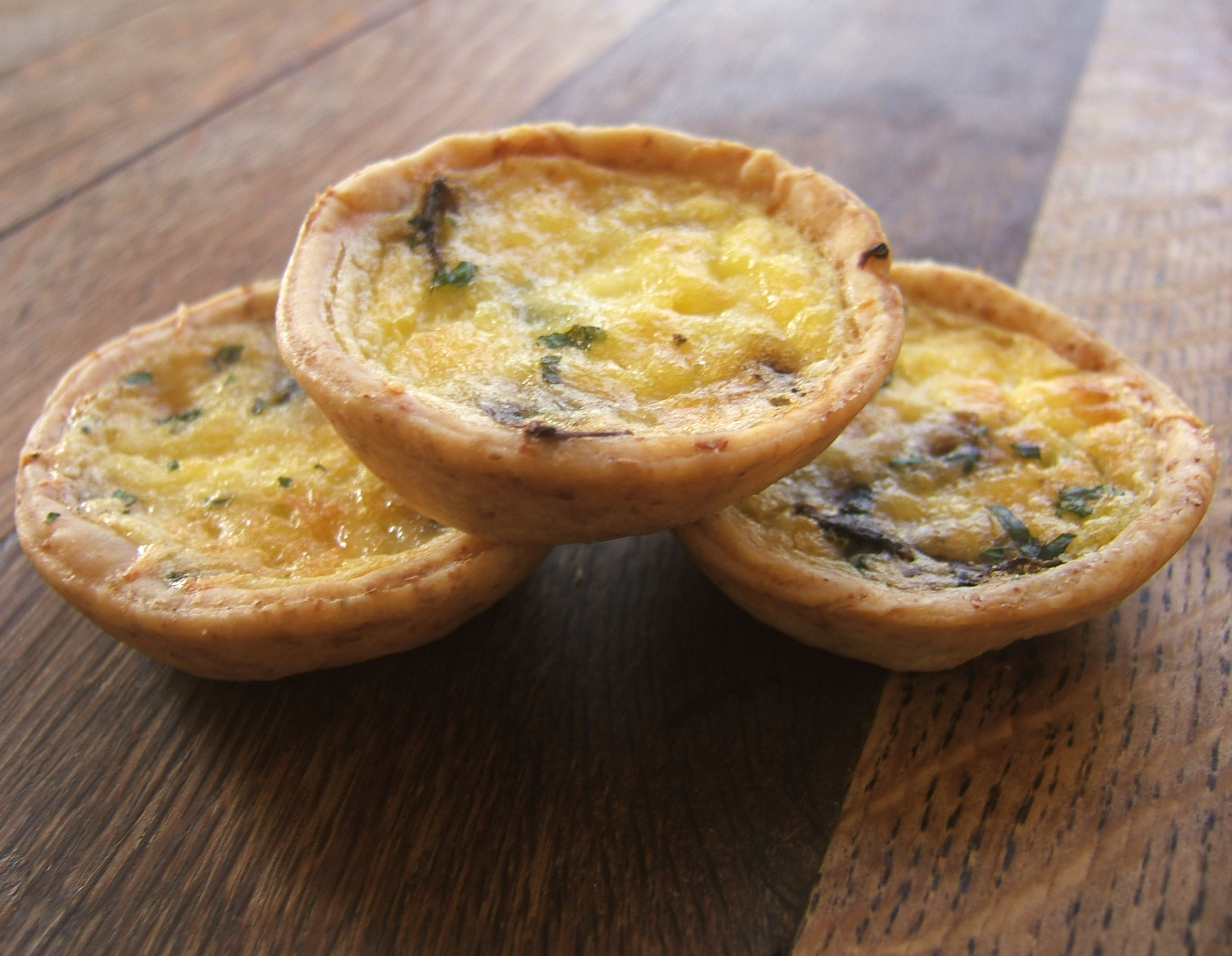
Miniature quiches

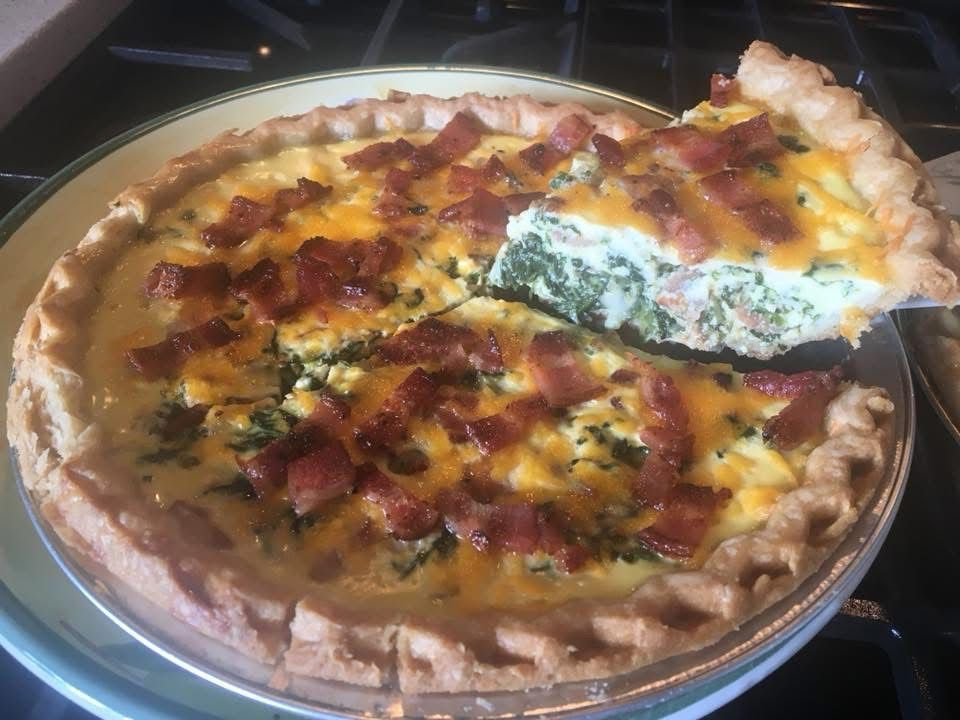
Quiche au fromage de Gruyère

== See also ==
- Pie
- Bacon and egg pie
- List of pies, tarts and flans
- Food Cube Rule
