= Egg pie =

Filipino dessert pie

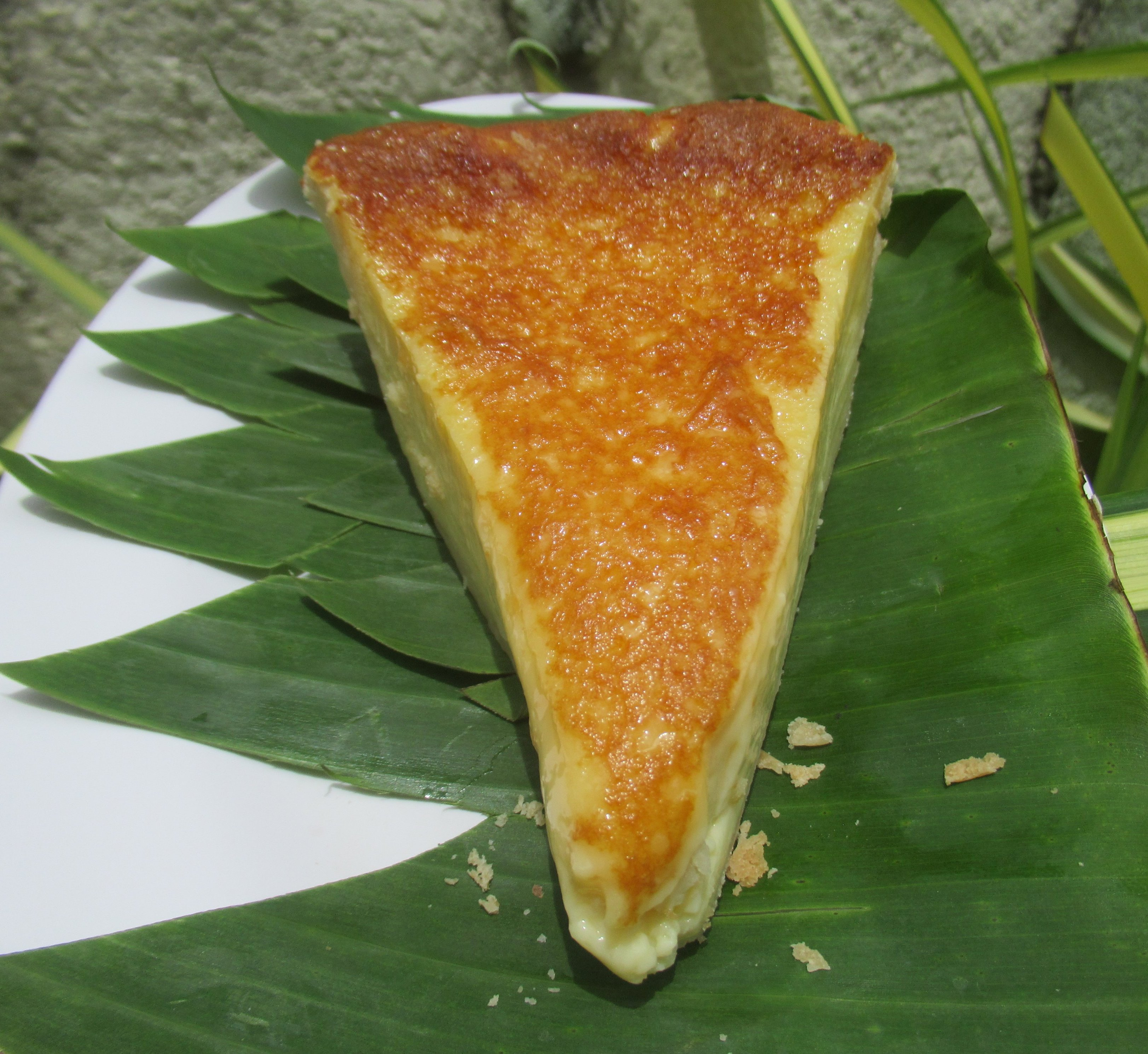
- Alternative names: Filipino egg pie
- Type: Pie, dessert
- Place of origin: The Philippines
- Main ingredients: Flour, butter, eggs, milk, sugar

Egg pie is a sweet Filipino pie dessert with an egg custard filling and a characteristic toasty brown top made from egg whites. It is made with flour, sugar, milk, butter, and eggs. Calamansi juice or zest may also be added. It is a type of custard pie. Egg pies are commonly sold in bakeries in the Philippines.

== Preparation ==
For the crust, flour, condensed milk, evaporated milk, egg yolk, and butter are mixed until they turn into a dough-like texture. The dough is kneaded and placed in wrap. For the filling, eggs, condensed milk, and vanilla are mixed in a bowl until they are foamy. Then, milk and condensed milk are put in a pan and are warmed. Add the mixtures to each other and mix again. In another bowl, add egg whites and sugar before stirring again. Form the dough to the shape of the baking pan, then add the mixture. Bake the pie.

== See also ==
- Banitsa
- Buko pie
- Custard pie
- Egg tart
- Yema
