= Turtle pie =

American dessert pie

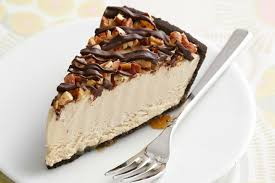
- Type: Pie
- Course: Dessert
- Place of origin: United States
- Main ingredients: Pecans, Caramel, Chocolate
- Variations: Chocolate Turtles
- Similar dishes: Cream Pie

A turtle pie is a dessert pie, originating in the United States. The turtle pie got its name due to the caramel, chocolate and pecans that are used to top the pies, which are said to have a similarity in flavor to that of DeMet's Turtles, which use similar ingredients. The pie usually has a cookie crumb crust and is often made with a custard, mousse or a cheesecake filling.

== History ==
The pie is said to have been created by the now-defunct fine dining chain The Velvet Turtle as a specialty pie. Pre-made, frozen turtle pies are sold by brands such as Marie Callender's and Edwards.
