= Buko pie =

Filipino coconut custard pie

Buko Pie
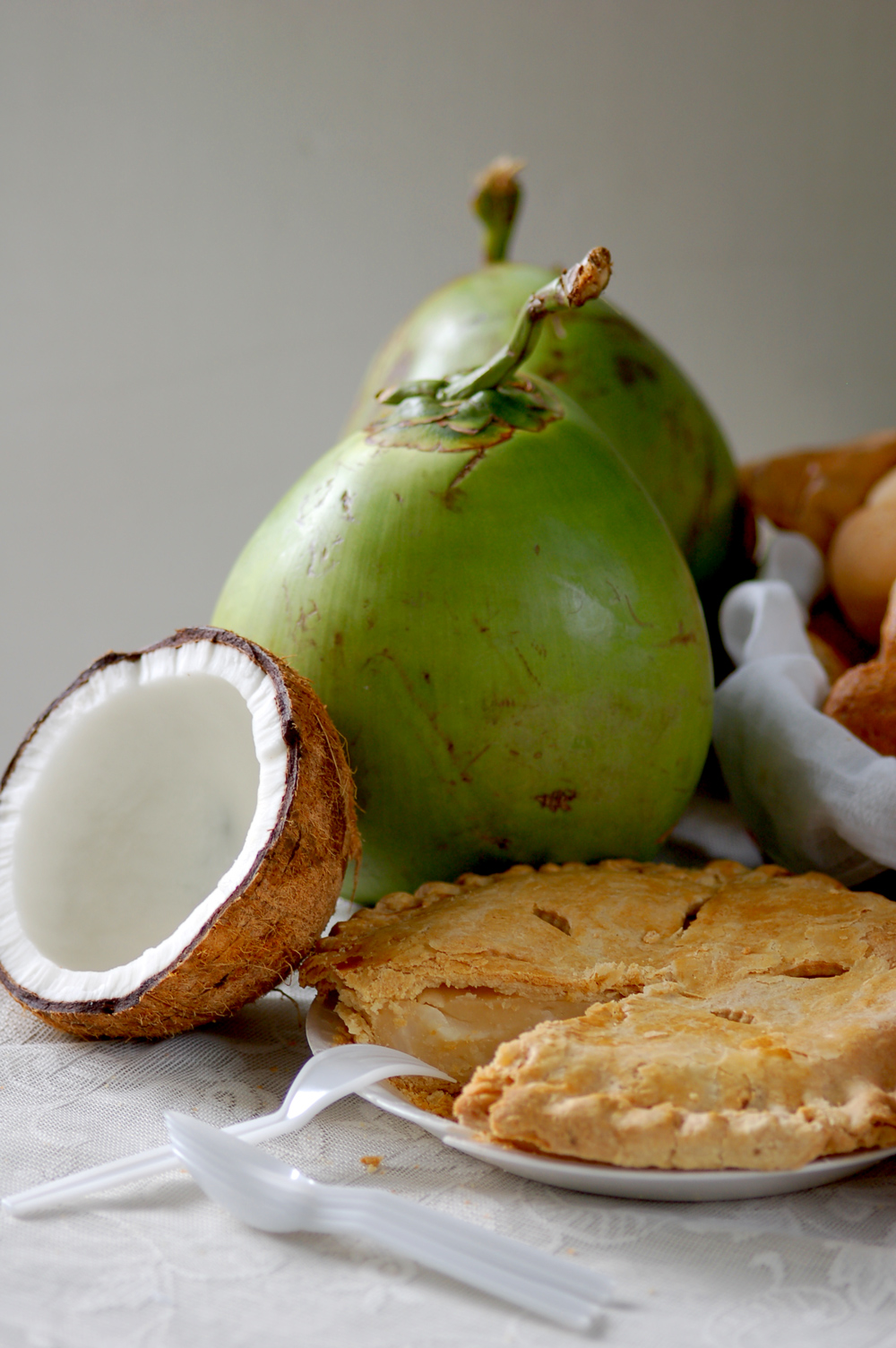
- Type: Pie
- Course: Dessert
- Place of origin: Philippines
- Region or state: Laguna
- Created by: Soledad Pahud
- Serving temperature: Cold
- Main ingredients: Pie shell, custard, young coconut, sweetened condensed milk
- Food energy (per serving): 290 kcal (1,200 kJ)

Buko pie, sometimes anglicized as coconut pie, is a traditional Filipino baked young coconut (malauhog) pie. It is considered a specialty in the municipality of Los Baños, Laguna, located on the island of Luzon.

Buko pie is made with young coconuts (buko in Tagalog), and uses sweetened condensed milk, which makes it denser than cream-based custard pies. There are also variations of the pie, which are similar but use slightly different ingredients, such as macapuno pie, that uses macapuno, a special type of coconut that is thick and sticky.

The pie was originally a delicacy only available in the Philippines, but blast freezing technology has allowed buko pie-makers the ability to export. As it has become easier to transport and more accessible around the world, people are able to buy it as a pasalubong or homecoming present after having visited the Philippines. Buko pie is traditionally plain, but nowadays flavorings such as pandan, vanilla, or almond essences are used.

Buko pie is different from the American coconut cream pie, as it has neither cream in the coconut custard filling nor meringue swirls on top of the baked coconut custard.

== Origin ==
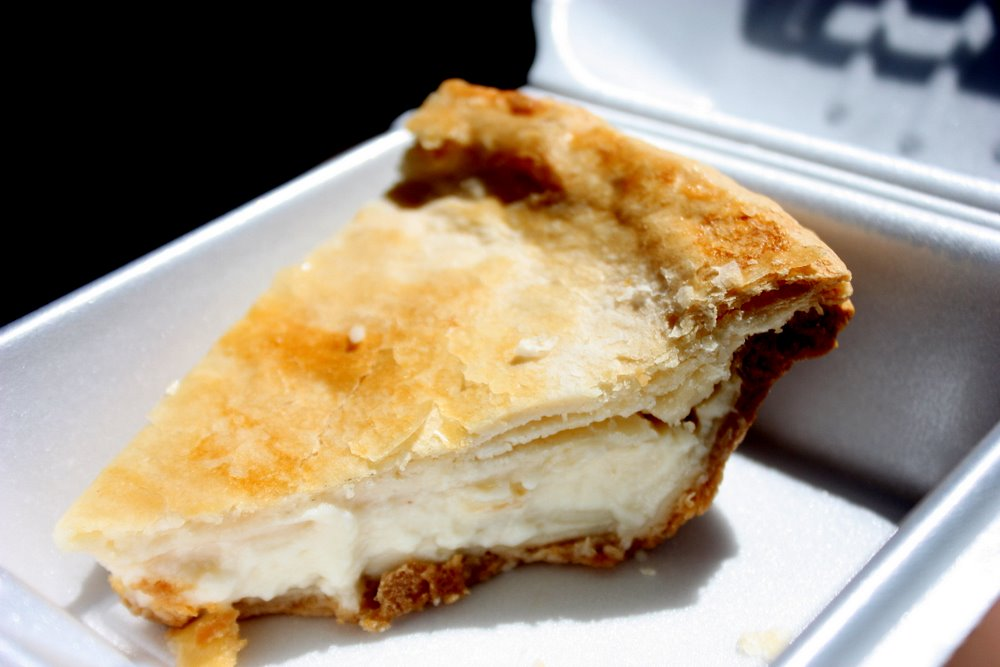
Buko pie from San Francisco

The buko pie is said to have originated from the province of Laguna in the Philippines. The creators of this Filipino pastry were the Pahud sisters, who were locals of Los Baños, Laguna. Soledad Pahud returned to her family in the Philippines after being a manager at a local company in San Francisco for 13 years. While she was working abroad, her sister, Apolonia, learned to make apple pies. In the process of starting up a bakeshop business, they tried to recreate the American dessert. As apples were not native to the Philippines, Pahud along with her family improvised and replaced the ingredient with buko, young coconuts. Using buko as the ingredient for the pie filling was recommended by one of her sisters, Apolonia, because of its abundance locally. The Pahud sisters' bakeshop business grew into what is now Orient Buko Pie Bakeshop, their own bakery specializing in buko pies. The sisters also created their own variations of the buko pie which include apple buko pie, pineapple pie, and tropical pie.

== Nutrition ==
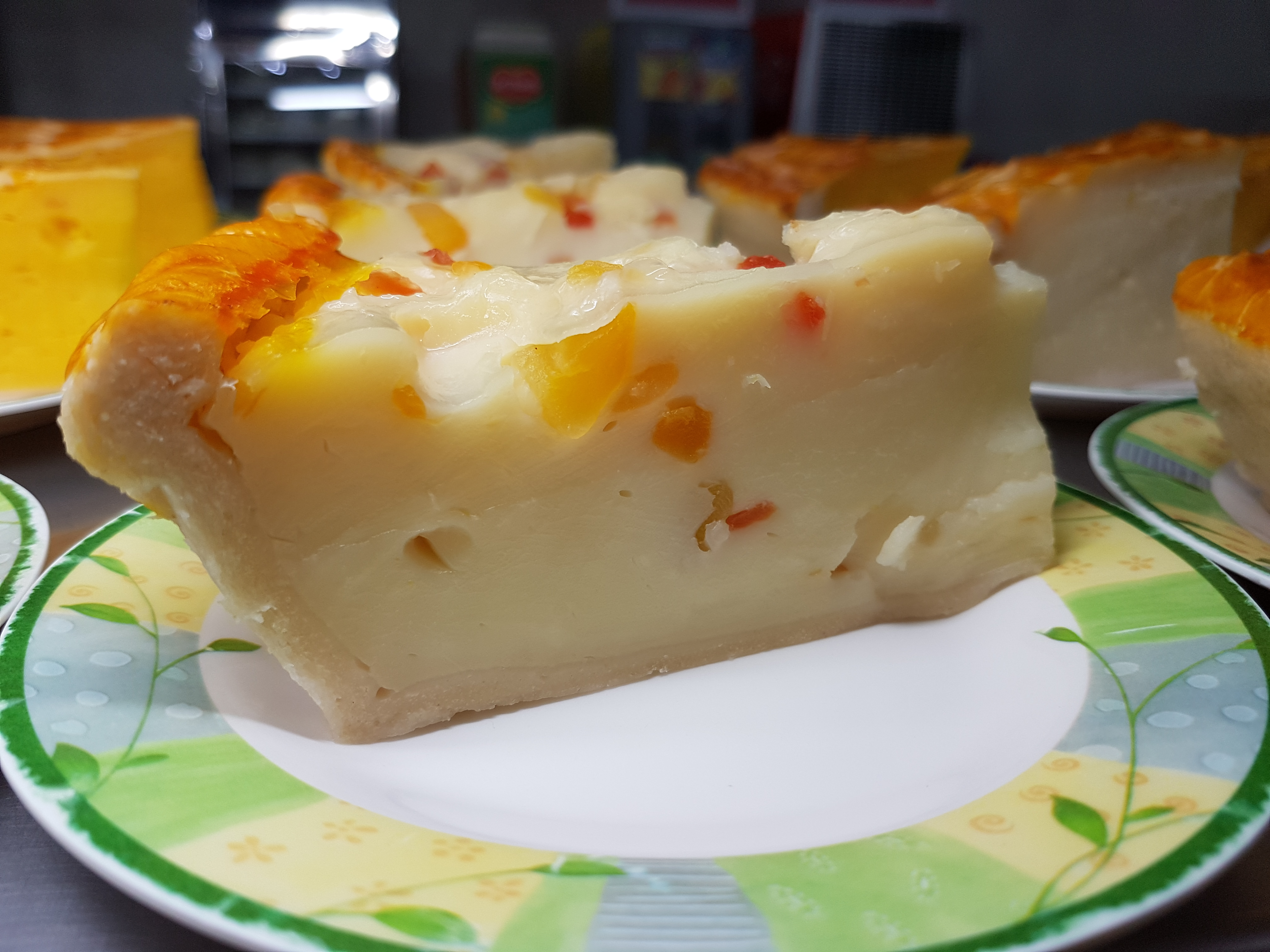
A version of buko pie with gulaman (agar jelly) as an additional ingredient

Buko pie is very high in calories and rich in fat, carbohydrates and proteins according to its nutritional value. It is a source of calcium, iron, niacin and folate. As a result of the use of white sugar and condensed milk in the pastry, excess calories and simple carbohydrates are found.

While the pastry contains 66.9g of carbohydrates, the level of simple carbohydrates within a buko pie is higher than the level of complex carbohydrates. The dish serves as a source of a healthy yield of iron. Buko pie also contains a high amount of sugar and magnesium, and an average amount of sodium.

== Method of preparation ==
When making buko pie a double baking method is followed. The pie crust and the pie filling need to be prepared separately before combining the two together. First the pie crust is made by mixing flour, salt and sugar in a bowl. Afterwards, the mixture is made into dough by adding and mixing in ice water and egg yolks. The dough mixture is then refrigerated and thinly rolled out by using a rolling pin. To finish the crust component of the buko pie, the dough is blind-baked and set aside to cool. Next, the pie filling is prepared. The pie filling ingredients listed above are mixed and cooked on low heat. Once the pie crust and the pie filling are finished, they are combined by pouring the filling into the pie crust. A second crust is used to cover the filling and seal the pie from all sides. It is then baked a second time until the crust is lightly browned.

== Similar desserts ==
Buko pie is similar to the Dutch-Indonesian klappertaart and the South African klappertert. Klappertaart differs from the Filipino buko pie as it is a baked creamy coconut custard without the crust, and contains raisins and nuts. Klappertert is most akin to the Filipino buko pie as it also has a crust, but differs in that it also adds apricot jam and a dash of cinnamon to the coconut custard.

Buko pie is also similar to the coconut cream pie of the Southern United States (sometimes known as "coconut custard pie") in terms of the main ingredients, but they are prepared differently. Buko pie also uses tender young coconut or macapuno and has a much higher ratio of coconut to custard, being more of a "coconut pie" rather than a "custard pie." Buko pie does not traditionally use nutmeg or vanilla, unlike American custard pies.

== See also ==
- Buko salad
- Egg pie
- Lamaw
- Nata de coco
- List of Philippine desserts
- List of pies, tarts, and flans
