= Bülbül yuvası =

Middle Eastern phyllo dough dessert

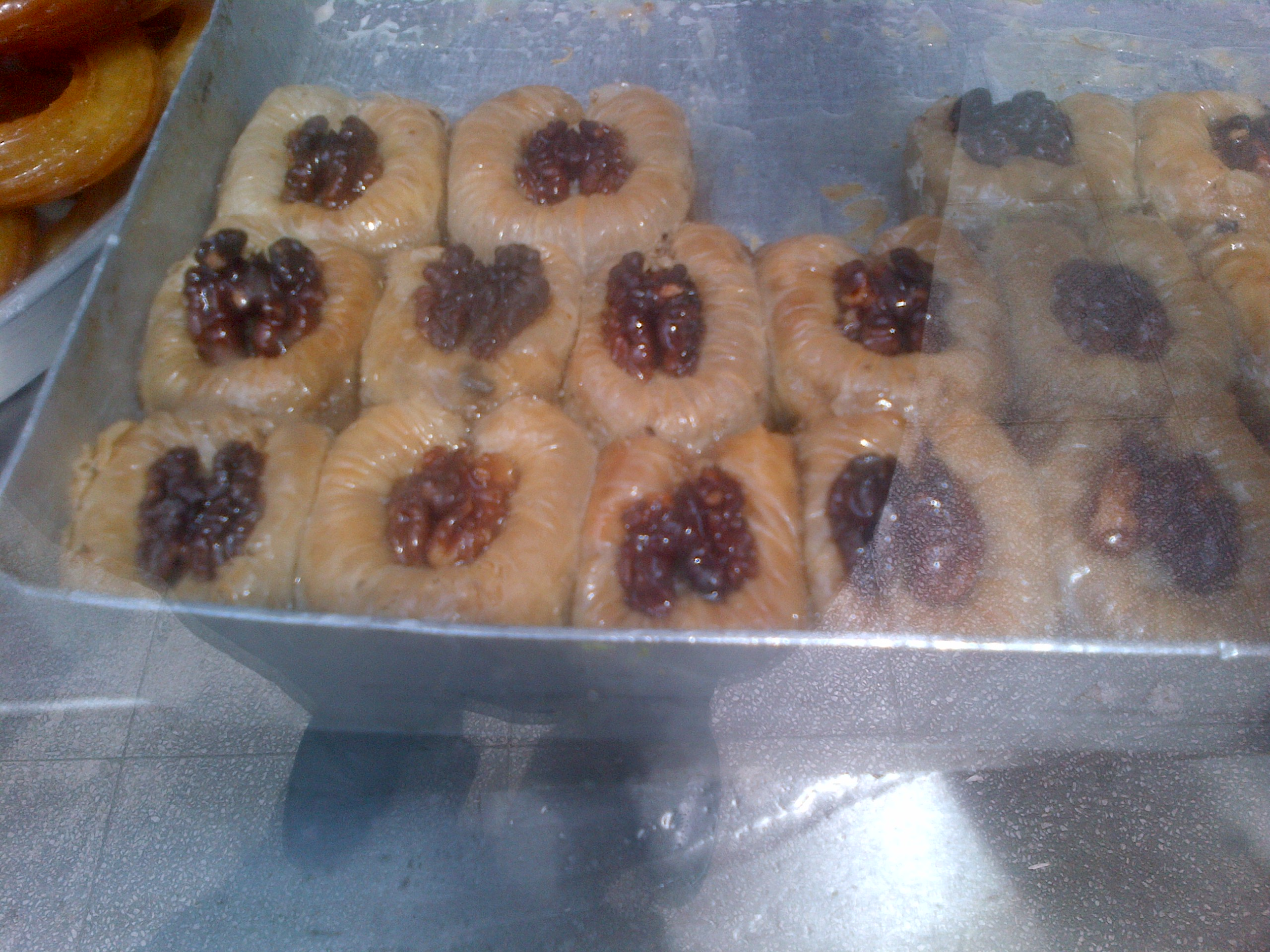
- Type: Pastry
- Region or state: Middle East
- Main ingredients: Filo dough, syrup, pistachios

Bülbül yuvası (Arabic: عش البلبل, romanized: ʻush al-bulbul), literally "nightingale's nest" or "Bulbuls nest", also known as Swar as-sitt (Arabic: سوار الست, lit. 'lady's bracelet'), is a Middle Eastern filo dough dessert. It takes its name from its hollow and circular shape. Having been baked, warm syrup is sprinkled, and the hollow center is filled with walnuts, or pistachios, while at the end, a walnut-half is placed on top of the confection before being served.

== Etymology ==
According to the Nişanyan etymological dictionary, the Turkish name bülbülyuvası is a compound of bülbül ("nightingale") and yuva ("nest"), with the possessive suffix -sı, literally meaning "nightingale's nest." The word bülbül itself is a borrowing from Arabic بُلْبُل (bulbul), which is an onomatopoeic term with the same meaning.

In Arabic, sometimes the name swar as-sitt (Arabic: سوار الست, lit. 'lady's bracelet') is used instead, which is derived from its shape.

== History ==
A similar dish dubbed "eat and give thanks" appears in a 13th century Arabic cookbook called Kitab al-Wuslah ila l-habib, it calls for wrapping dough around a dowel, sliding it down form the dowel, and then shaping it into a "cake" and frying it in sesame oil. The dish was also known as qarni yārūq; a Turkish language-name, indicating a possible origin.

An 1844 Syrian and Egyptian Arabic dictionary by Swedish Orientalist Jacob Berggren contained descriptions of a pastry known as nid de rossignol or ʻush al-bulbul (Arabic: عش البلبل, lit. 'nightingale's nest'), described as small box-shaped cases made from a dough of flour and butter, filled with minced meat and nuts such as pine nuts, seasoned with pepper and salt, and baked on large metal trays. It also noted sweet variants instead filled with pistachios or almonds. The same book also describes "sowwar es-sitt" (Arabic: سوار الست) as "madame's bracelet; a pastry prepared in the same way as baklava, and formed into bracelets."

== Geographic indication ==
In 2022, the Turkish Patent and Trademark Office issued a geographical indication for bülbül yuvası to the city of Gaziantep. The specification states that the pastry is prepared from thin sheets of baklava dough made with wheat flour, eggs, water, salt, and starch. The dough is rolled into thin rectangular sheets, wrapped around a thin rolling pin, compressed toward the center to create a "pleated" form, and then shaped into circular nests. The pastries are arranged in trays coated with clarified butter, rested briefly at room temperature, and baked in stone ovens over oak wood fire at low heat. After baking, hot syrup prepared from sugar, water, and lemon juice is poured over the pastries, which are then garnished with powdered pistachio before serving.

== Varieties ==
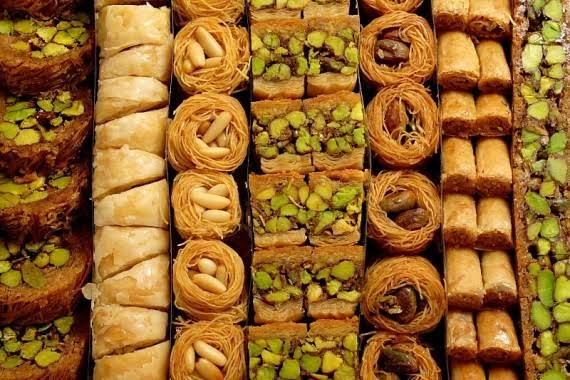
Syrian baklava set; the nest-shaped sweet is also called "nightingale's nest", seen third from left and third from right

In some varieties of 'ush al-bulbul, the phyllo pastry is sometimes replaced with a nest-shaped roll of knafeh pastry, with whole pistachios in the middle, made to resemble bird eggs, this style of pastry is popular in Egypt and the Levant. This variety is sometimes referred to as "bird's nest baklava", or as "bulbul's nest knafeh" (Arabic: كنافة عش البلبل).

== Dishes with the same name ==
The name ʻush al-bulbul may also refer to a Syrian meat patty, similar to sfiha.

== See also ==
- Baklava
- Şöbiyet
- Sütlü Nuriye
