= Galaktoboureko =

Custard-filled dessert

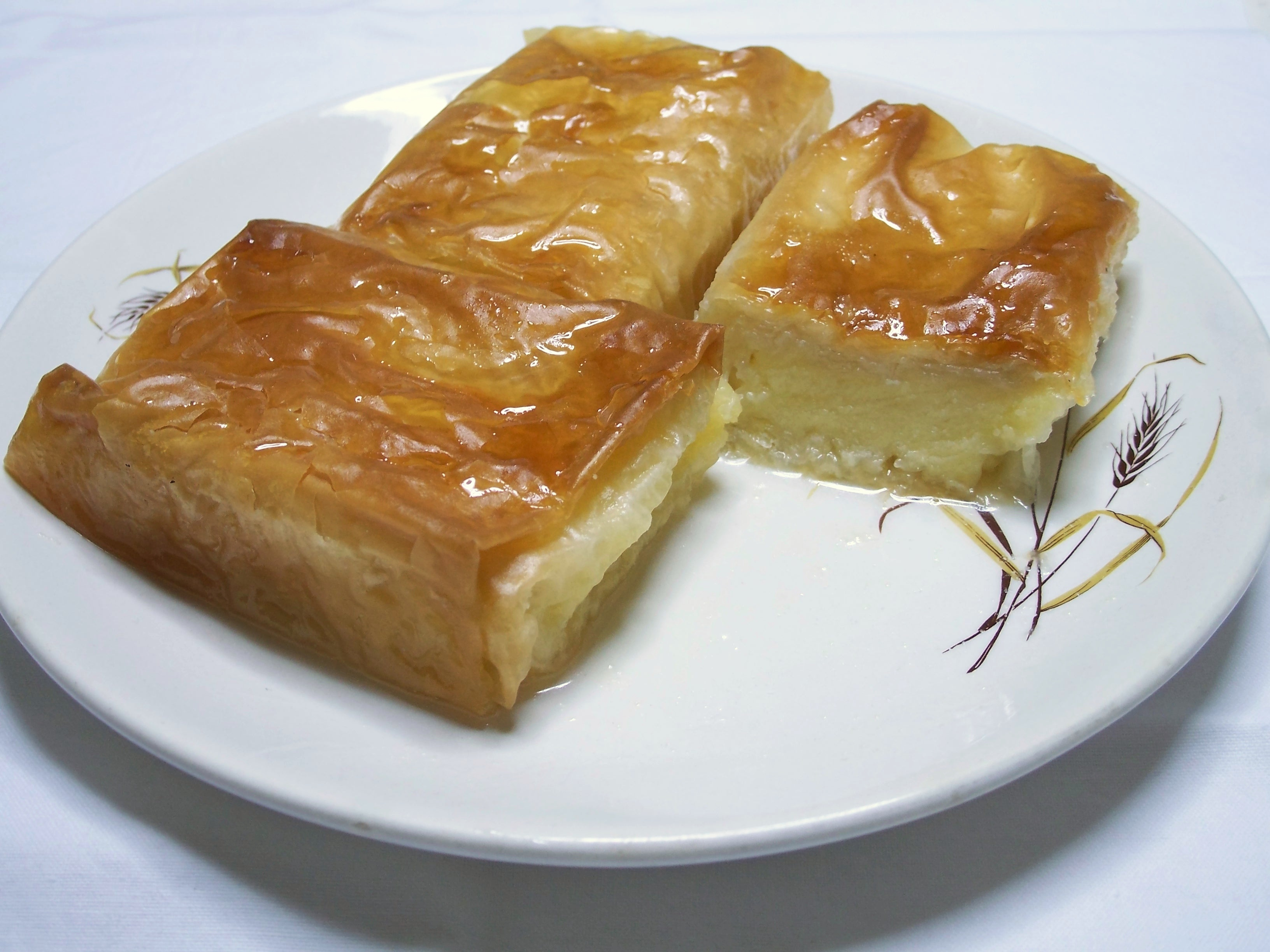
- Three pieces of galaktoboureko
- Type: Pastry
- Place of origin: Byzantine Empire
- Region or state: Greece, Eastern Black Sea region of Turkey
- Main ingredients: Phyllo, semolina custard or muhallebi
- Similar dishes: Bougatsa, Şöbiyet, Warbat, Shaabiyat

Galaktoboureko (Greek: γαλακτομπούρεκο, Laz: paponi, Turkish: laz böreği) is a dessert popular in Greece and the eastern Black Sea Region of Turkey. It is made of custard, layers of filo dough and covered in syrup. Galaktoboureko is made with a type of pudding called muhallebi or semolina custard. In Albania, it is a dessert sometimes prepared during the Orthodox Easter, although Qumështor, an Albanian custard that includes no filo dough is traditionally preferred. It is popular in Cyprus as galatopourekko.

== Preparation ==
Galaktoboureko may be made in a pan, with filo layered on top and underneath (20 layers in total) and cut into square portions, or rolled into individual servings (often approximately 10 cm (4 in) long). It is served or coated with a clear, sweet syrup. The semolina custard, or milk rice (muhallebi) may be flavored with lemon, orange, or rose. Unlike mille-feuille, which it only vaguely resembles, the custard is baked with the pastry, not added afterwards. It is popular across Greece, with regional and local variations in ingredients and preparation. Notable versions are associated with Athens and Thessaloniki.

Laz böreği/Paponi is made with a variation of the pudding called muhallebi with the inclusion of cornmeal and ground black pepper, instead of semolina custard. It is popular in the Rize and Artvin provinces in the Black Sea Region, among the Laz. Its ingredients are thin filo dough, butter, muhallebi, black pepper and simple syrup.

== History ==
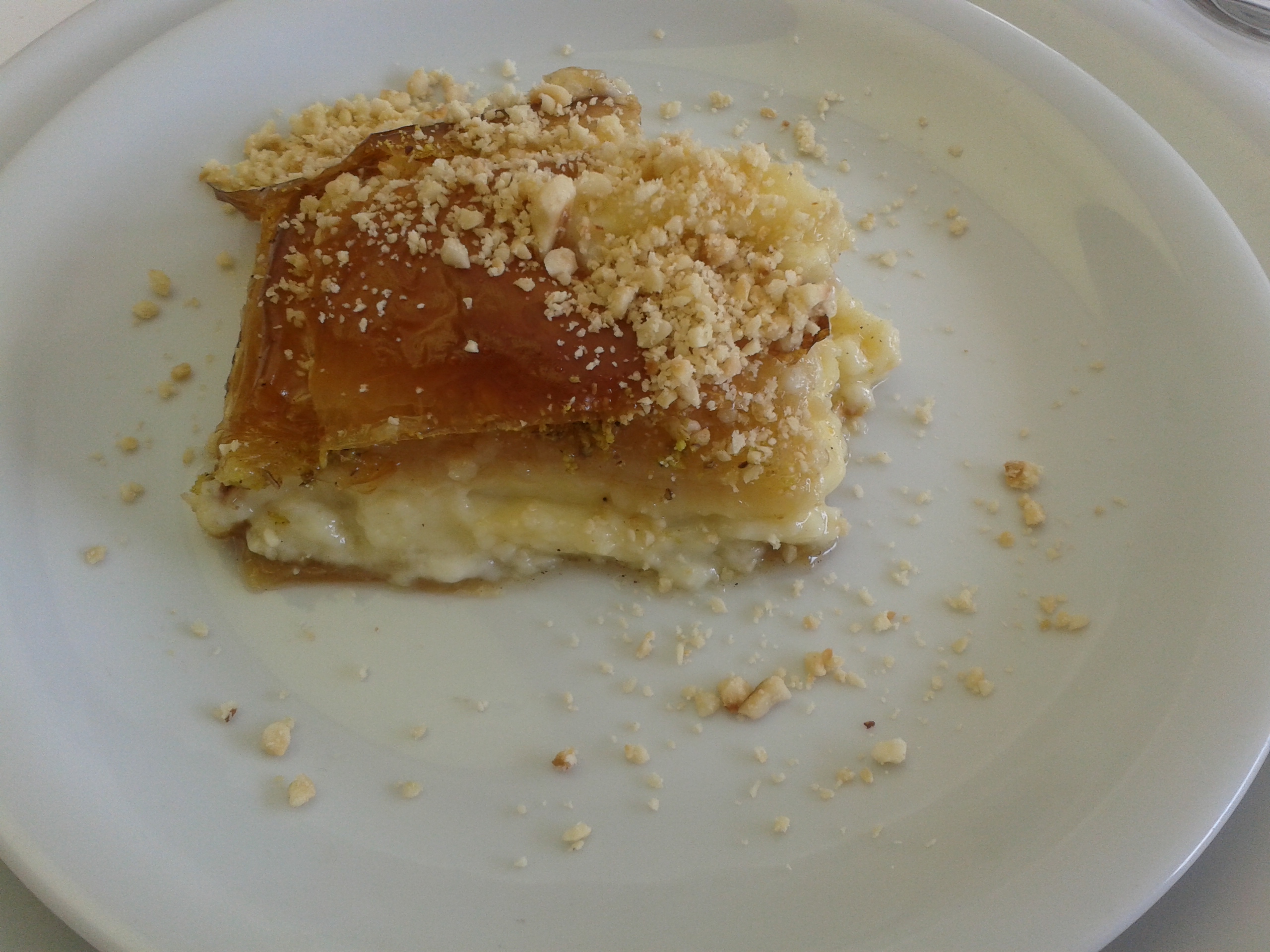
Galaktoboureko

The earliest known references to this dessert date back to the Byzantine period, highlighting the historical importance of milk and semolina in ancient Mediterranean culinary traditions. Ancient Greek cuisine included a similar dish called plakous, made with honey, cheese, and wheat. Filo, a culinary invention originating in Ancient Greece was adopted by Ottomans during the Ottoman period. According to tradition, Galaktoboureko originated in the wealthy Greek areas of West Minor Asia and in particular Smyrna.

The Turkish version of the dessert was registered in 2019 as a geographical indication by the Turkish Patent and Trademark Office under the name "Hopa Laz Böreği".

== See also ==
- Bougatsa
- Baklava
- Bundevara
- Flies' graveyard
- Şöbiyet
- Pouding chômeur
