= Lady's navel =

Type of pastry

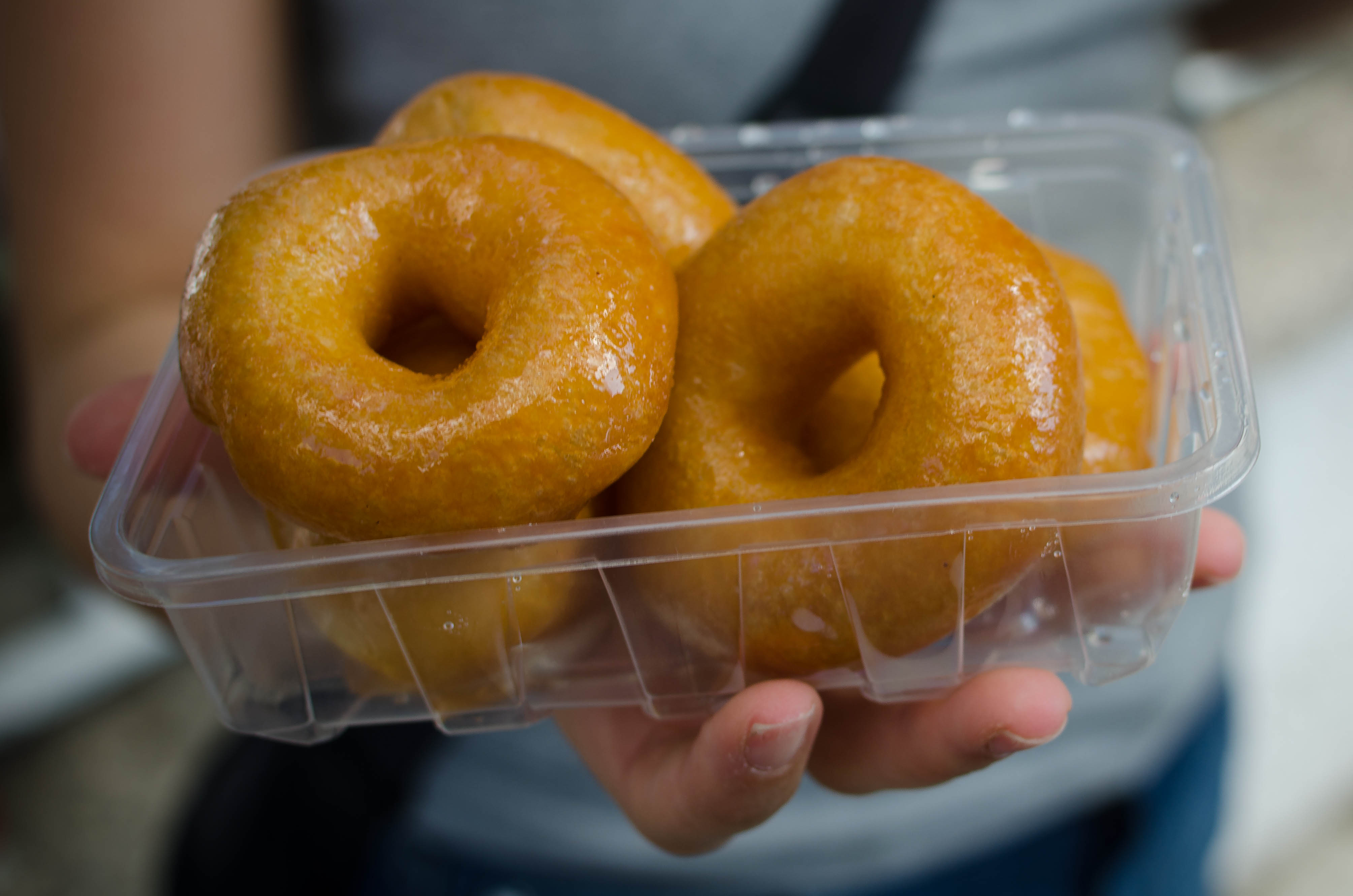
- Alternative names: Woman's navel
- Type: Pastry
- Place of origin: Turkey
- Main ingredients: Choux pastry, syrup

A lady's navel (hanım göbeği) or woman's navel (kadın göbeği) is a type of sweet pastry from Turkey. They are made from balls of choux pastry which are given a dimple, deep-fried and then soaked in syrup. It derives its name from its donut-like shape that resembles a navel (belly button).

It bears similarity to other desserts with "evocative" names such as Vezir Parmağı (visier's fingers), Dilber Dudağı (lady lips), Kerhane Tatlısı (brothel dessert), Sütlü Nuriye (Milky Nuriye) etc.

== See also ==
- List of choux pastry dishes
- List of pastries
- Navel orange
