= Vizier's fingers =

Type of Turkish dessert

- Type: Dessert
- Place of origin: Turkey
- Main ingredients: Semolina, milk, egg, caster sugar, water, lemon juice, almond essence, butter, rose water

Vizier's fingers (Turkish: Vezir parmağı), is a type of Turkish dessert. Ingredients include semolina, milk, egg, caster sugar, water, lemon juice, almond essence, butter and rose water. The dessert reveals sexual imaginations just like other Turkish desserts such as Hanımgöbeği (lady's navel), Dilber Dudağı (lady lips), Kerhane Tatlısı (brothel dessert), Sütlü Nuriye (Milky Nuriye), etc.

== See also ==
- Şekerpare
- Revani
- Baklava
- Tulumba
