= Bourek (Algerian cuisine) =

African savoury pastry

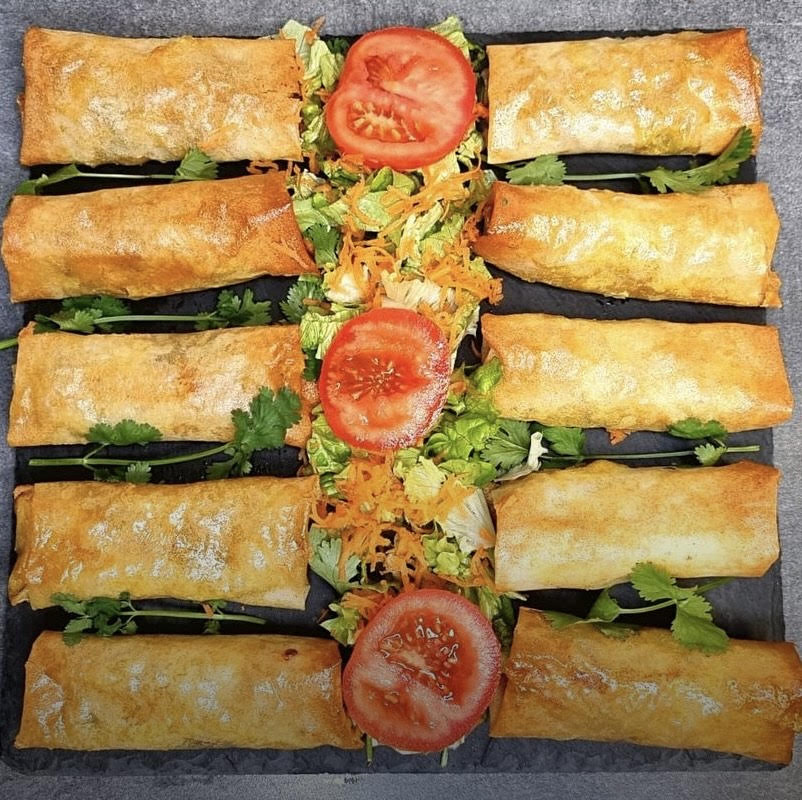
- Traditional Algerian bourek pastry
- Alternative names: Bourak, Borek, Brik
- Course: Appetizer, side dish
- Place of origin: Algeria

Algerian bourek (Arabic: بوراك), also known as "brik" in eastern Algeria, is a popular variation of the savory pastry burek found in the Middle East and North Africa. Algerian bourek is usually made up of thin pastry sheets, known as "dyoul" in Algeria, which can be purchased from stores or made at home. These sheets are then filled with a blend of mashed potatoes, chopped onions, and spices like cumin and paprika. In addition to the potato filling, Algerian bourek may also include other variations such as tomatoes with minced meat, shrimp, chicken, or ground beef with cheese. The pastry is then folded into a triangular shape and either baked or deep fried until golden and crispy. Bourek comes in many different shapes and sizes, including triangles, rectangles, and spirals.

Algerian bourek is often served as an appetizer or snack, and can be found in many street food vendors and restaurants throughout the country. It is also commonly served during Ramadan as part of the iftar meal, the meal that breaks the daily fast during the holy month.
