= Yufka =

Turkish flatbread

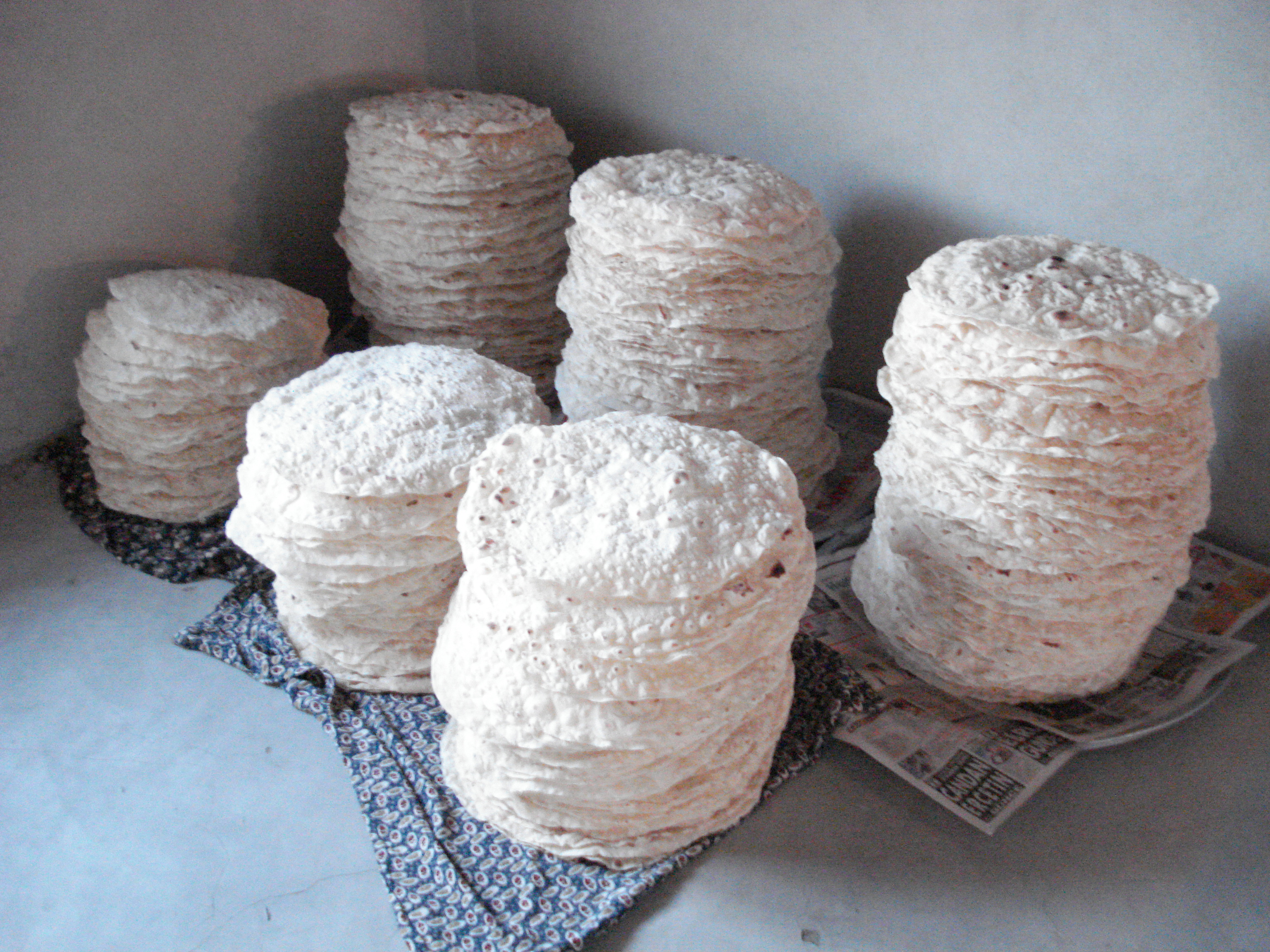
- Stacks of yufka bread
- Alternative names: Jufka, jufke, iofka, yufxa, yupqa, yuvgha
- Type: Flatbread
- Associated cuisine: Turkish cuisine
- Main ingredients: Flour, water
- Similar dishes: Filo, saj bread

Flatbread making and sharing culture: Lavash, Katyrma, Jupka, Yufka
- UNESCO Intangible Cultural Heritage
- Country: Azerbaijan, Iran, Kazakhstan Kyrgyzstan, Turkey
- Reference: 01181
- Region: APA / ENA

Inscription history
- Inscription: 2016 (11th session)
- List: Representative

Yufka (Turkish: [jufˈka]) is a thin, unleavened flatbread widely used in Turkish cuisine. It is made of flour, water, and salt, which are rolled into large, thin sheets of dough using an oklava, and briefly cooked on a griddle known as a saj. It is similar to saj bread and lavash, but has a different preparation technique and is not cooked on the walls of a tandoor. Yufka is believed to be the forerunner of filo, strudel dough, and warqa. The same term is used in Turkey for filo sheets, which follows a similar preparation method, although the flatbread is slightly thicker and usually in rounds rather than rectangular sheets.

In 2016, UNESCO recognized the "flatbread making and sharing culture" of lavash, katyrma, jupka, and yufka as an Intangible Cultural Heritage of Humanity, shared by Turkey, Azerbaijan, Iran, Kazakhstan, and Kyrgyzstan.

== History ==
Food historian Charles Perry in The Oxford Companion to Food argues that nomadic Turkic peoples had an "obsessive interest" in making layered bread, possibly in emulation of the thick oven breads of city people. Grain-based foods played a large part of their diet, and since they were nomads, a type of bread that could be rolled out and cooked rapidly on a portable griddle was more practical. In 1433, the French pilgrim Bertrandon de la Brocquière (1400–1459) encountered Turcoman nomads in the mountains of Antakya, who offered him fresh filo with yogurt, cheese, and grapes. He watched the women rolling out "thin cakes of bread", and remarked on the speed of their preparation:

"The cakes are a foot broad, round, and thinner than wafers; they fold them up as grocers do their papers for spices, and eat them filled with the curdled milk... It was here I saw women make those thin cakes I spoke of. This is their manner of making them; they have a small round table, very smooth, on which they throw some flour, and mix it with water to a paste, softer than that for bread. This paste they divide into round pieces, which they flatten as much as possible, with a wooden roller of a smaller diameter than an egg, until they make them as thin as I have mentioned. During this operation they have a convex plate of iron placed on a tripod, and heated by a gentle fire underneath, on which they spread the cake and instantly turn it, so that they make two of their cakes sooner than a waferman can make one wafer."

According to Marti Sousanis, this bread was called yufka, the term modern Turkish uses for a thin sheet of dough. The 11th-century Turkic dictionary Dīwān Lughāt al-Turk, compiled by Mahmud Kashgari, records the term yuvgha, an archaic form of yufka, defining it as "pleated or folded bread". It is mentioned on several occasions, including a variety of dough (yalaci yuvga) described as "so fragile that it crumbled at the touch", and one preparation in which the dough was folded and fried in butter (qatma yuvgha), a technique still employed in the preparation of börek.

Perry observes that these layered breads survive among the Turkic peoples. In Uzbekistan, a cake known as yupga is made by frying a thin sheet of dough on both sides, layering minced meat and onions in it, covering the filling with a raw sheet of dough, turning it over to fry the raw side and then repeating the process to build up a cake that is ten or more layers thick. A similar dish is made in Tatarstan called yoka, consisting of ten to twelve thin sheets of dough that are fried, buttered, and stacked before being cut into wedges in pie-fashion and served with tea. Moreover, a pastry called qatlama is known among the Uzbeks, Kazakhs, Tatars, Bashkirs, Azerbaijanis, Turkmens, and Uyghurs, in which a greased sheet of dough is rolled out and cut into discs, and then flattened by hand or with a pin to produce a layering.

Sousanis suggests that yufkas did not evolve into filo until after the Turks entered the Near East in the 10th century and came in contact with the advanced cookery of Persian courts, who introduced an early form of puff pastry that involved laminating and buttering the dough, rolling it thin, and filling it with almonds.

== Sources ==
- Sousanis, Marti (1983). The Art of Filo Cookbook: International Entrées, Appetizers & Desserts Wrapped in Flaky Pastry. Aris Books. ISBN 978-0-943186-06-1.
