= Malsouka =

Maghrebi food ingredient

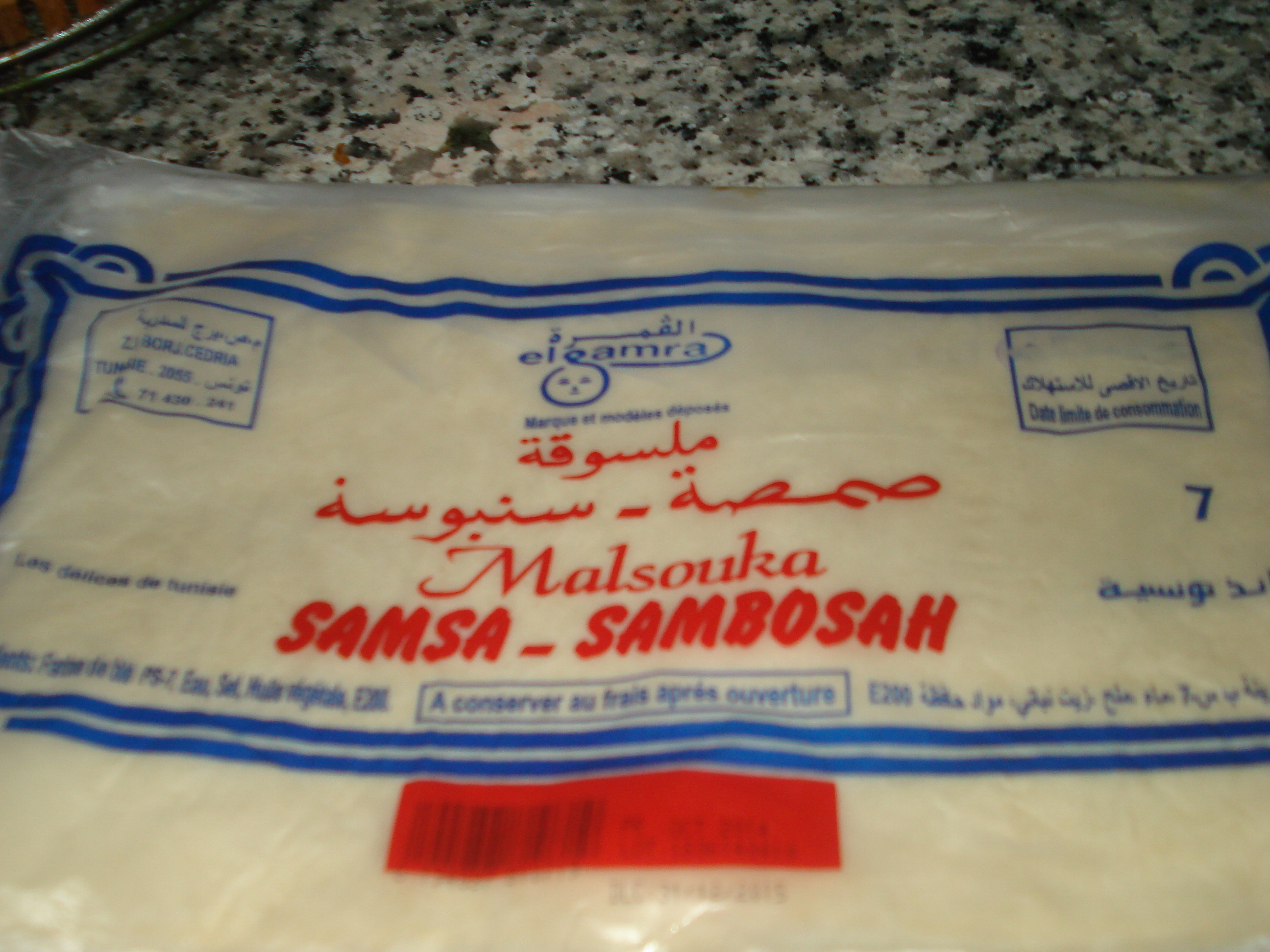
- Alternative names: Dyoul, Warqa

Malsouka (Arabic: ملسوقة, also malsouqa) or warqa (Arabic: ورقة), also known as brik sheets (Arabic: ورق البريك, French: feuilles de brick) or bourek sheets (ورق البوراك) or dioul (Arabic: ديول), is a Maghrebi pastry sheet that resembles filo. It is thicker than filo and unlike filo is created by spreading wafer-thin layers of dough on a heated pan rather than by rolling a raw dough.

There are many applications for the dough, including the tagine malsouka, the pastilla, the samsa, the brik, and the baklava.

== History ==
According to food historian Gil Marks, malsouka is a Maghrebi semolina-based adaption of the phyllo dough used in Börek brought into the Maghreb by the Ottomans.

== See also ==
- List of pastries
- Algerian cuisine
- Moroccan cuisine
- Tunisian cuisine
