= Warbat =

Cream-filled filo pastry dessert

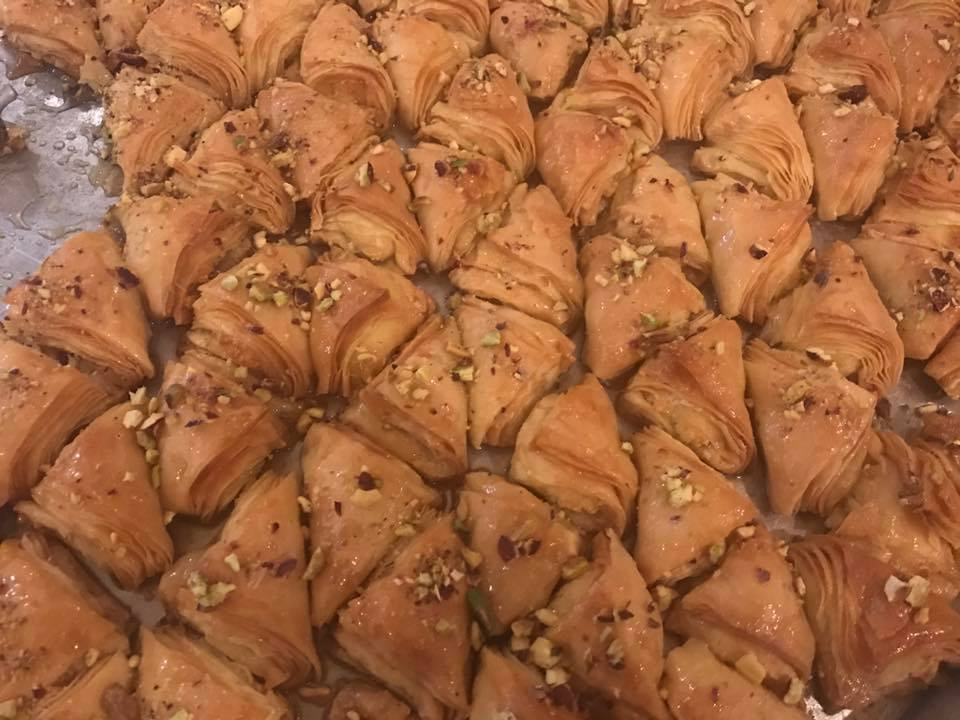
- A platter of warbat
- Alternative names: Shaabiyat, Şöbiyet
- Type: Pastry
- Course: Dessert
- Region or state: Levant
- Associated cuisine: Levantine cuisine
- Serving temperature: Hot or room temperature
- Main ingredients: Filo, custard or qishta, sugar syrup, ghee or butter
- Variations: Filled with nuts or cream; sometimes topped with pistachios and petals
- Other information: Popular during Ramadan

Warbat (Arabic: وربات), also known as Shaabiyat (Arabic: شعيبيات, شعبيات) and Şöbiyet, is a Levantine sweet pastry similar to baklava.

Warbat consists of layers of phyllo dough filled with a semolina based custard, though it is sometimes also filled with pistachios, walnuts, almonds, or sweet cheese. The dessert is topped with a sweet syrup made from sugar, water, and lemon juice brought to a boil and then left to cool and thicken.

When served with cream or qishta it is called warbat bi-qishteh or warbat be gishta. Warbat is often served during Ramadan.

In Jordan, warbat and knafeh are often the most sold desserts for celebrations, such as tawjihi exam results.

== History ==
The Turkish Patent and Trademark Office states that Şöbiyet have been a part of the cuisine of Gaziantep "since ancient times". According to historian Nawal Nasrallah, kaymak-filled baklava are mentioned in the 19th-century works by Ottoman author Turabi Efendi.

Shʻaybiyyāt (شعيبيات) are mentioned as a breakfast food in Arabic Aleppan texts from 1840-1875. Late 19th-century proceedings by the International Congress of Orientalists described shaʻbīyah (شعبية) as a triangular cake filled with cream and pistachios. The 1885 Lebanese Arabic cookbook Ustadh al-Tabbakhin provided a recipe for shuʿaybāt (شعيبات) which called for filling square pieces of dough with baklava filling, baking them in a samneh-coated tray, then soaking them in qatir.

Shaabiyat were popularized in Germany by refugees of the Syrian civil war.

== Variations ==
"Lady's cheeks" (Arabic: خدود الست, called so because of its shape) is a version of warbat made from 2 circular layers of phyllo pastry around a layer of cream. This variation is common in Nablus city.

Turkish Şöbiyet (Antep Şöbiyeti) received official registration and geographical indication status from the Turkish Patent and Trademark Office on 6 April 2022 for the Gaziantep region. The patent specifies that they are made with 12 layers of phyllo pastry, a kaymak filling, and topped with syrup and pistachios. Şöbiyet are popular during Eid al-Fitr in Turkey.

Syrian shaabiyat are made into a variety of shapes besides triangles with different fillings.

== Etymology ==
According to one account, the dessert is attributed to a confectioner named Shuʿayb (شعيب), whose identity is otherwise unknown. Another explanation holds that the dessert was originally made in a large size sufficient to satisfy a person on its own, leading it to be called الشبعيّة (al-shabʿiyya), derived from the Arabic root ش ب ع (sh-b-ʿ), meaning “to be full or satiated”; the name was later phonologically altered to الشعيبيّة (al-shuʿaybiyya), with the plural form الشعيبيّات (al-shuʿaybiyyāt).

According to the Etymological Dictionary of Contemporary Turkish by Sevan Nişanyan, the word Şöbiyet is derived from the Arabic word (shabʿiyyat).

The name warbat is derived from the warbats triangular shape, the word warbat (وربات) means "corners" in Arabic.

== Gallery ==
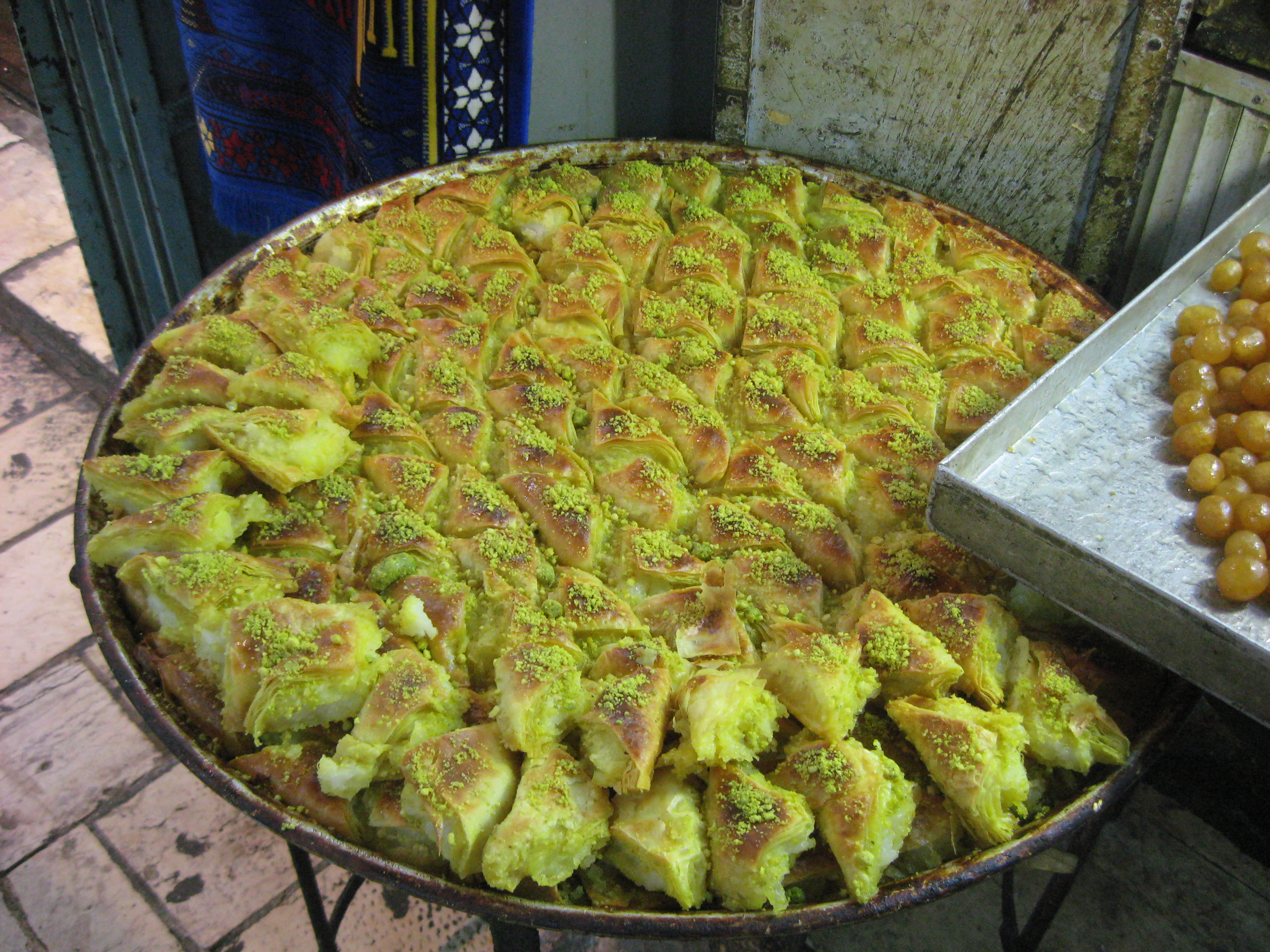
Warbat in the Old City of Jerusalem.

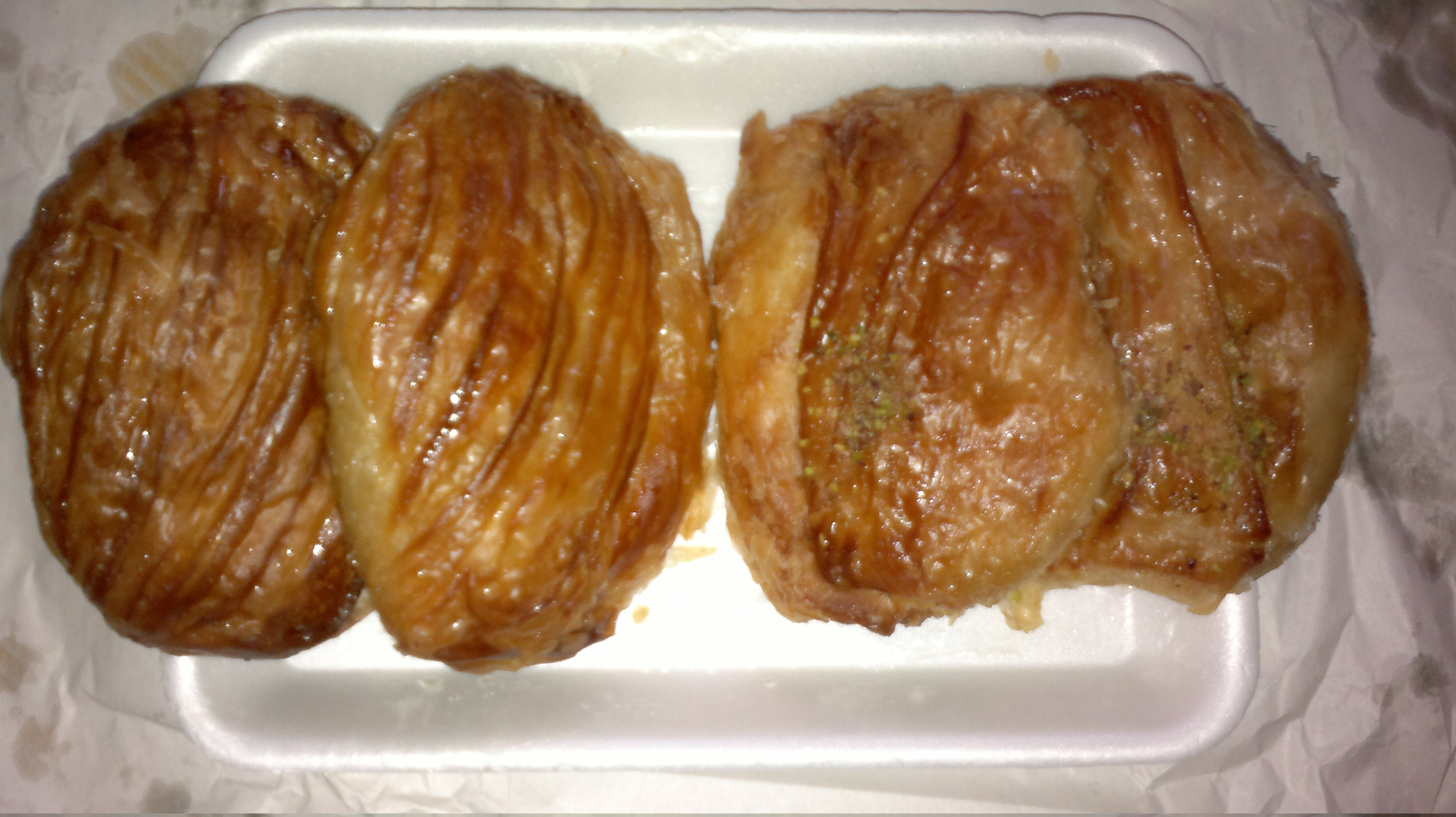
Syrian shaabiyat

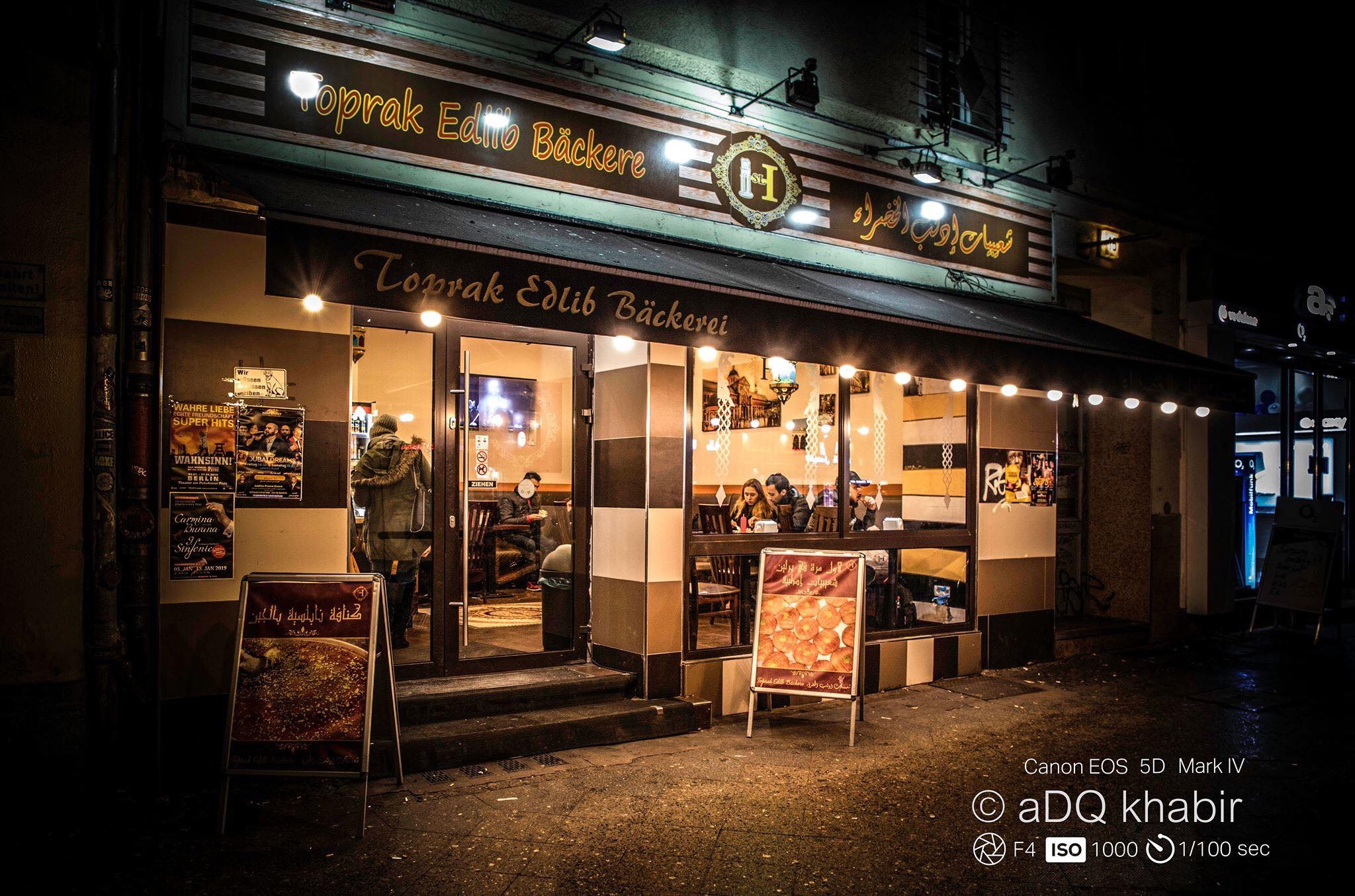
Syrian-style restaurant in Berlin serving shaabiyat

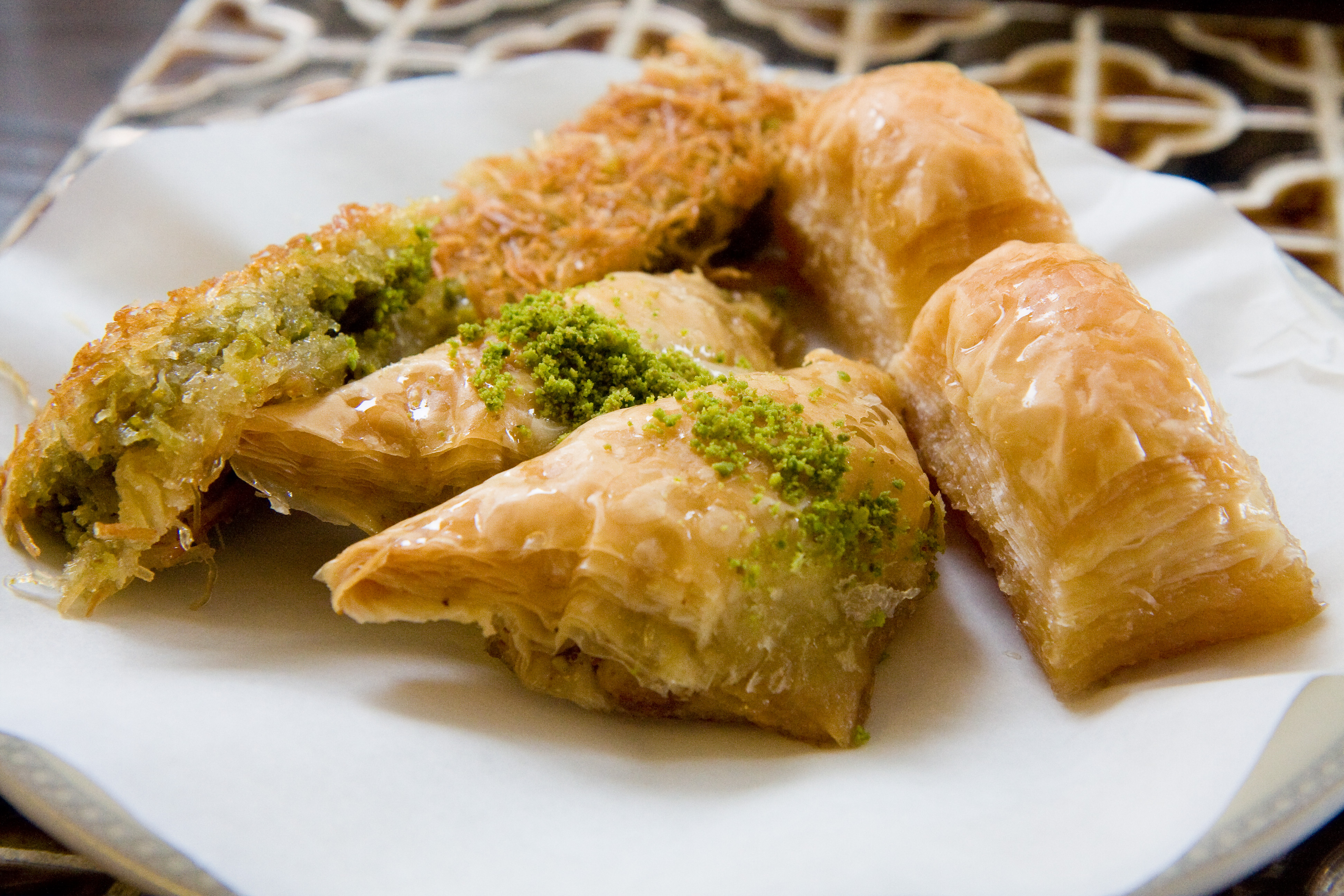
Turkish Şöbiyet, with baklava and kadayıf.

== See also ==
- Galaktoboureko
- Knafeh
- Bougatsa
- Kahi (food), Iraqi sweet breakfast of cream and filo pastry
- List of Turkish desserts
