= Tagine malsouka =

Tunisian cuisine dish

Malsouka
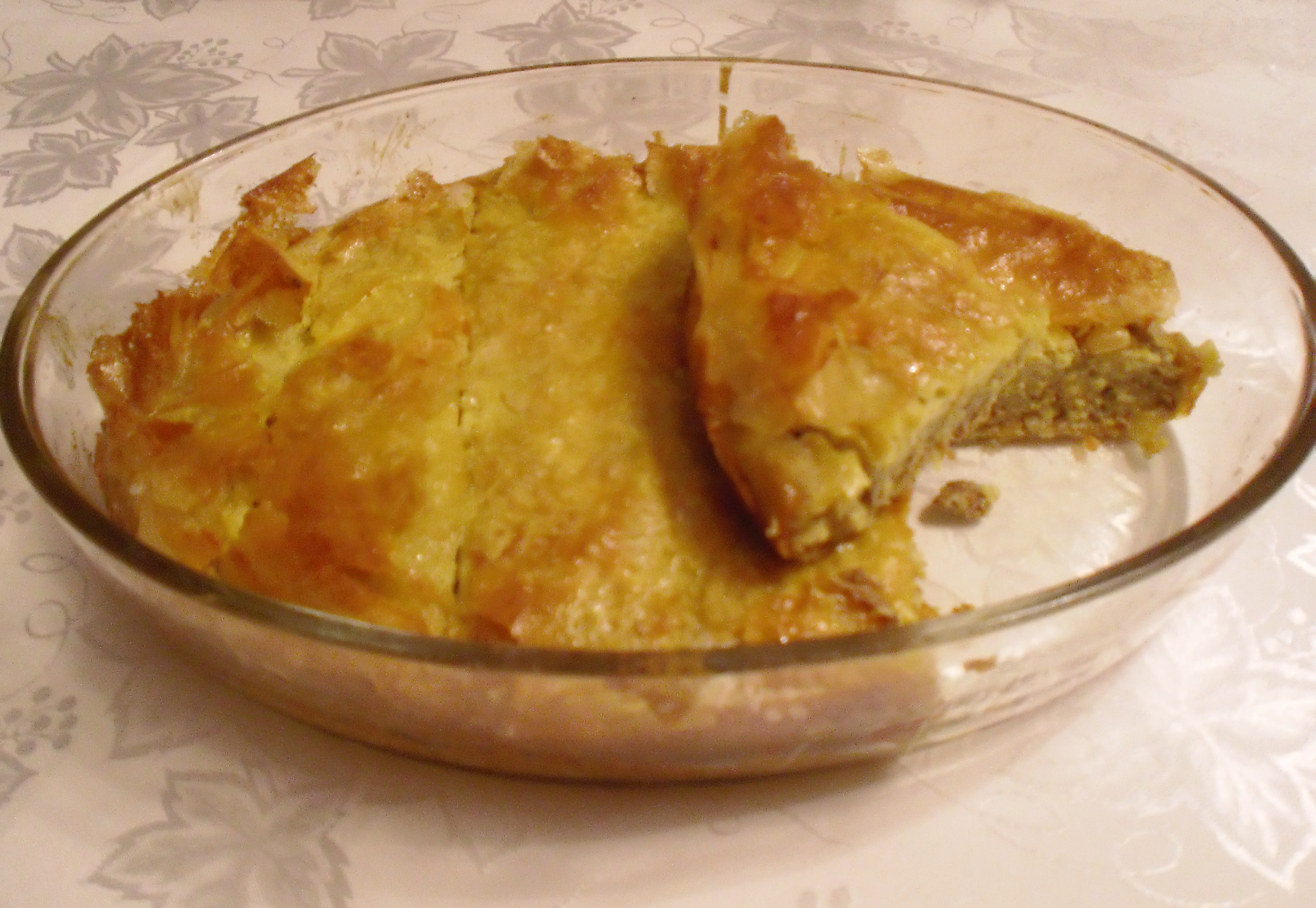
- Alternative names: Malsouqa
- Type: Pastry
- Place of origin: Tunisia
- Region or state: Mediterranean

Tagine malsouka (Tunisian Arabic: ملسوقة), or malsouqa, is a Tunisian dish composed of sheets of malsouka dough, stuffed with a savory filling.

The Arabic name comes from لصق (lasaqa) meaning "to stick", referring to the cooking process of taking a ball of raw dough and sticking it to the heated pan to create the layered malsouka sheets. The name Malsouka can refer to both the pastry and the dish.

The Tunisian tagine refers to the savory dish itself, unlike the Algerian and Moroccan version, pastilla, which indicates the utensil into which a stew is prepared and served, akin to the English meat pie. The Tunisian one, filled with eggs, vegetable or meats, is often enjoyed cold as a finger food.

== See also ==
- Pastilla
- List of pastries
- Mediterranean cuisine
- Tunisian cuisine
- Tunisian culture
- History of Tunisia
