= Zelnik =

Savoury Bulgarian pastry

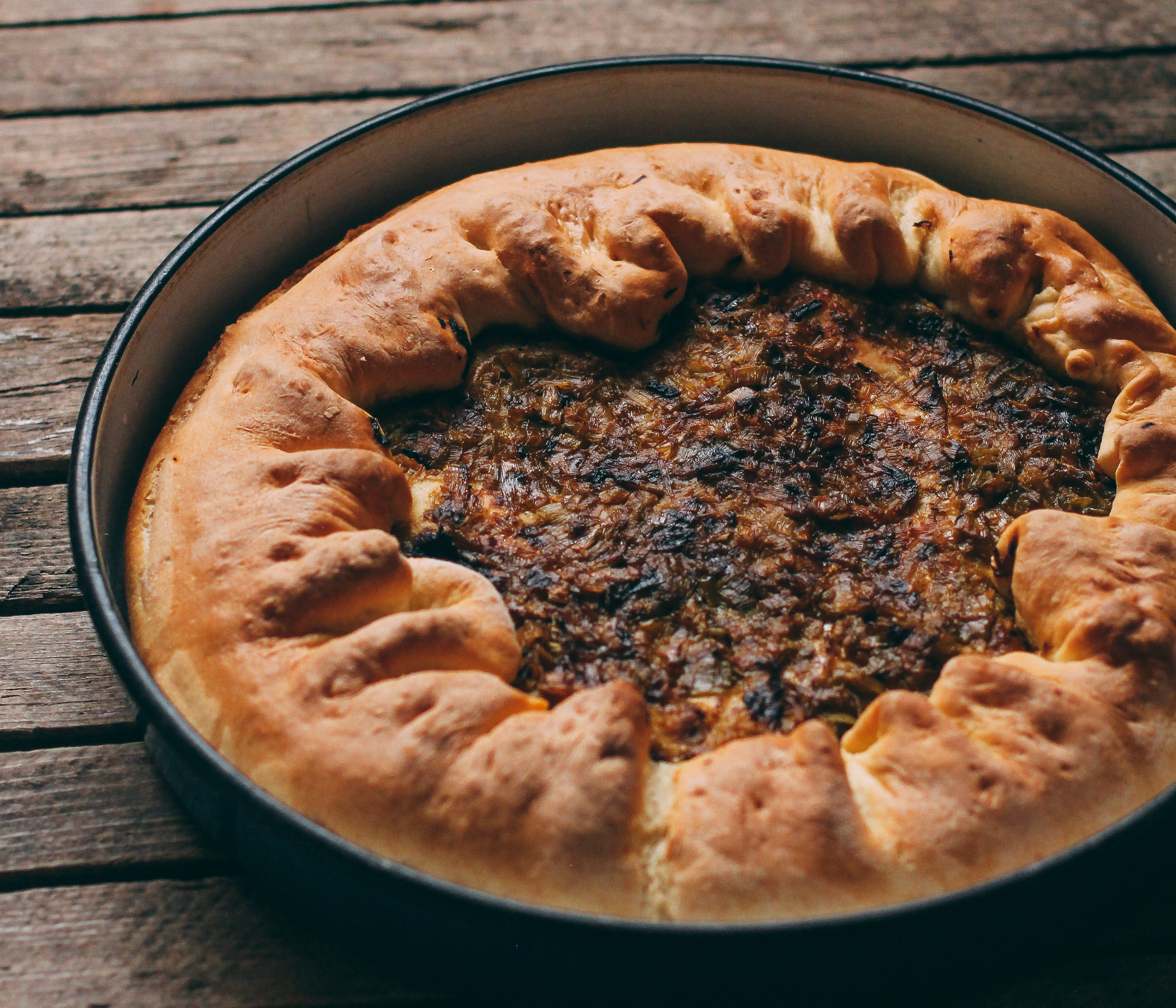
- Zelnik filled with leek
- Type: Savoury pie
- Place of origin: Balkans
- Serving temperature: Warm
- Main ingredients: Phyllo pastry, sirene, eggs, spinach, sorrel, browned meat, leeks, rice

Zelnik is a traditional pastry eaten in Bulgaria and North Macedonia. It is composed of layers of thinly-rolled leavened wheat flour dough, or possibly phyllo pastry, filled with various combinations of sirene (a white cheese), feta cheese, eggs, sorrel, browned meat, leeks, spring onions and/or rice. In winter, the filling traditionally includes pickled cabbage, from which the dish derives its name ("cabbage" in Bulgarian: зелe or Bulgarian: зелка, in Macedonian: зелка). Bulgarian zelnik could be made also with various wild and cultivated leafy greens like collard, lettuce, orache, rumex, Chenopodium album, spearmint and many others. Zelnik is sometimes served with yogurt and it is best eaten warm.

Zelnik is similar to burek, a dish popular in the Middle East, Eastern Europe and Central Asia. Zelnik is often mistakenly referred to as börek. Unlike zelnik, cabbage börek is made for holidays and festivals and is served with kefir. The crust and the layers of börek are thicker and other spices are used. Zelnik is typically made with leek and sirene and consists of very thinly rolled layers of phyllo dough. Zelnik is usually prepared as one long, thin piece of pastry and wound up into a spiral shape.

== See also ==
- Balkan cuisine
