= Filo =

Unleavened pastry dough

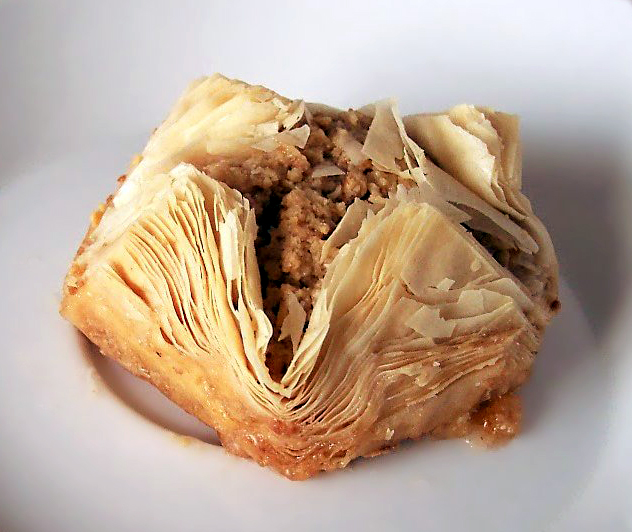
- Baklava, made with filo pastry
- Alternative names: Phyllo, fillo, fila
- Type: Dough
- Place of origin: Turkey, Greece
- Region or state: Middle East, Balkans
- Main ingredients: Flour, water, oil

Filo (Note: Also referred to as phyllo, fillo, or fila) (Greek: φύλλο; [ˈfilo]) is a very thin unleavened pastry dough used for making baked goods. Filo-based products are made by layering many sheets of filo brushed with oil or butter; the pastry is then baked.

The paper-thin form of modern filo was developed in the Ottoman Empire by the 15th century. During this period, it became the foundation for a variety of sweet or savoury pastries, such as baklava and börek, which further diversified in shape over the centuries. Commercially manufactured filo became widely available in supermarkets during the 1970s.

== Etymology ==
The term filo is borrowed from the Greek word fýllo (φύλλο), meaning "leaf". The earliest known use of filo is from the American newspaper Atlanta Constitution in 1946.

In Turkish, filo is referred to as yufka, which means "thin". It derives from Old Turkic yuvka, meaning "slender", "insubstantial", or "thin". The earliest known use of yufka as a reference to thin sheets of dough appears in the 17th-century multilingual lexicon Thesaurus Linguarum Orientalium, Turcicæ, Arabicæ, Persicæ (1680) by Franciscus a Mesgnien Meninski, where the Ottoman Turkish word jufka (Ottoman Turkish: یوفقه) is defined in several languages as "subtle", "thin", and "like paper", and "dough or cake", "leafy or layered cake", and "foliated pastry".

The word yufka was initially used as a thin physical descriptor, where its earliest mention dates back to the 7th century, when the Chinese Buddhist monk and scholar Xuanzang defined az yuka as "scanty and meagre". By the 8th century, the term appeared in the Tonyukuk inscriptions. Yufka as a culinary term was first established in the 11th-century Turkic dictionary Dīwān Lughāt al-Turk, in which the Karakhanid scholar Mahmud al-Kashgari detailed several variations of thin and folded bread, including yubqa, yuqa, or yuwqa ("thin loaves"), yarma yuvġa ("folded bread"), qatma yuvġa ("folded bread cooked in butter"), and yalāči yuvġa ("a type of folded bread") that "when the slightest thing touches it, it crumbles because of its thinness".

== History ==
=== Origin ===
Numerous ancient Greek and Roman sources attest to the preparation of thin doughs and layered pastries in classical antiquity. In ancient Greek and Roman culinary sources, laganon (Ancient Greek: λάγανον, diminutive λαγάνιον, laganion; Latin: laganum) generally denotes a thin, flat preparation of dough. The lexicographer Hesychius of Alexandria defines it as a small cake made from fine wheat flour (semidalis) and oil. The term also appears in ancient Greek literature, including the works of Aristophanes and Athenaeus. The Roman cookbook attributed to Apicius uses lagana as dough layers in baked dishes containing meat, fish, and other ingredients. Chrysippus of Tyana, whose work on baking is preserved by Athenaeus, describes lagana that are stretched, fried in oil, and drenched in honey. In another recipe from the same work, Athenaeus describes gastris, a Cretan confection also called a small plakous. Its dark filling is made from ground nuts, almonds, and poppy seeds mixed with boiled honey and pepper, and is enclosed between two lagania. The instruction is explicit: "stretch out two lagania" (ἕλκυσον λαγάνια δύο), placing one underneath and the other on top so that the filling lies between them. Roman sources also describe layered pastries: in De Agri Cultura (76), Cato the Elder describes placenta, a baked dish assembled from thin sheets of dough (tracta) brushed with oil and layered with cheese and honey.

Byzantine sources also attest to the continuation and development of ancient Greek and Roman pastry-making traditions, including the use of inherited terminology and established confectionery practices. Alongside plakountai (πλακοῦνται), a general term for cakes and pastries used for both everyday and festive occasions, Byzantine texts record psathyria (ψαθύρια—derived from ψαθυρός, meaning "friable" or "flaky"), a type of confectionery prepared with "very thin, almost transparent sheets of dough". Originally denoting crisp, flaky fragments of bread or pastry in classical Greek, psathyria became an established commercial specialty in early Byzantine Constantinople, where a 4th-century Syrian pastry-seller (ψαθυροπώλης, psathyropōlēs) named Theoctistus even lent his trade's name to a faction of the Arians known as the Psathyrians. Later Byzantine texts, such as the 10th-century Life of Saint Andrew the Fool, continue to list psathyria among luxury banquet delicacies alongside plakountes. While the surviving descriptions do not confirm whether psathyria were produced using the exact stretching technique of modern phyllo, they provide medieval evidence for the use of paper-thin, flaky dough layers in Byzantine confectionery.

Meanwhile, 9th-century Arabic sources describe lawzinaj (لوزينج), an almond confection wrapped in pastry described as being as thin as "grasshopper's wings" (ajniḥat al-jarād), indicating that ultra-thin dough wrappers were also established in the medieval Middle East.

At the same time, there are food historians who suggest that filo evolved from yufka, a thin, layered flatbread that was developed by Turkic peoples of Central Asia during the medieval period, often served folded or piled up in stacks with butter or other fillings between the layers in a pastry-like manner. It is argued that traditional yufka served as the base for the paper-thin refinements perfected by Ottoman pastry chefs.

Therefore, the precise origin of modern paper-thin phyllo remains a subject of discussion among food historians, with scholars tracing its development to both Eastern Mediterranean pastry traditions and Central Asian layered breads (yufka). A widely cited view—endorsed by The Oxford Companion to Food—attributes the refinement of modern phyllo to the imperial kitchens of the Ottoman Empire in Istanbul by the 15th century, where palace cooks developed techniques for rolling and stretching dough into tissue-thin sheets. On this basis, The Oxford Companion to Food argues that the dough in its modern form is of Turkish origin. Other scholars, including Speros Vryonis and Maria Leontsini, emphasize direct continuity from ancient Greco-Roman and Byzantine pastry-making traditions—such as placenta, koptoplakous, and psathyria—into the Ottoman period.

According to The Washington Post, some credit the Greeks, saying that it was first mentioned as a bread and walnut sweet in Homer's Odyssey, written around 800 BC. Thomas Day Seymour, however, states that walnuts, along with almonds and pistachios, were not known among the foods of the Homeric Greeks. Susanna Hoffmann notes the existence of pies among Ancient Greeks, including the description of a cheesecake made with honey and milk in the poem "Banquet" by Philoxenos from the fifth century BC, although Hoffmann emphasizes that ancient sources gave no details on how such pies were made. Historian Speros Vryonis describes the Byzantine sweet koptoplakous (κοπτοπλακοῦς) as "the same as Turkish baklava", which was two sheets of pastry layered with finely chopped walnuts, almonds, sesame, and honey between them; the baklava itself descending from the placenta cake. Food writer Aglaia Kremezi contends that the placenta cake was "probably very different" from the modern Eastern Mediterranean pies and börek, and that it would have required transformation before becoming the crunchy, paper-thin filo of today.

=== Ottoman period ===
According to Priscilla Mary Işın, flatbreads and sheets of dough underwent a transformation in the Ottoman kitchens, where chefs constantly refined techniques for rolling and stretching dough into silky translucent sheets of filo. Sousanis and Gil Marks similarly argue that Ottoman pastry chefs perfected a method for stretching the traditional yufka into extreme thinness, using it to produce an array of baked goods, such as baklava and börek. Baklava appears to be the first dish made of filo.

Işın notes that filo is traditionally rolled using a long, thin rolling pin known in Turkish as an oklava. In the 19th century, Ottoman pastry chefs developed a faster method of rolling out walnut-sized balls of pastries into large circles, in which they rolled a dozen of starch-dusted layers simultaneously, producing 10–20 tissue-like sheets. Today, this method is mainly used by professional baklava-makers and sometimes by home cooks. Rolling out filo was widely practiced among rural Turks, according to a Turkish cookbook written in 1900 by the Ottoman army officer Mahmud Nedim, who advised unmarried officers that if they could not roll out pastry themselves they should ask one of the soldiers, "most of whom know how to make yufka".

=== Popularization ===
The Ottomans prepared paper-thin dough throughout the Ottoman Empire, including the Balkans, where it was known as phyllo ("leaf" in Greek) and fila in Arabic. Following the Ottoman conquest of Hungary under Suleiman the Great in the 16th century, Hungarian sources began referring to a pastry known as rétes, the first recorded name for strudel, whose development has been influenced by the concept of yufka. This dough became integrated in many local pastry traditions of Europe, as well as its Asian and African colonies.

Beginning in the 1960s, Greek immigrants began to popularize hand-made filo in parts of the United States. With the invention of a practical filo machine in 1971, commercial filo dough was suddenly available frozen in American supermarkets, making it accessible to everyone.

== Preparation ==
Preparation of custard bougatsa in an Athens cafe

Filo dough is made with flour, water and a small amount of oil. Homemade filo takes time and skill, requiring progressive rolling and stretching to a single thin and very large sheet. A very big table is used, preferably with a marble top. If the dough is stretched by hand, a long, thin rolling pin is used, with continual flouring between layers to prevent the sheets from sticking to one another. In modern times, mechanical rollers are also used. Prior to World War I, households in Istanbul typically had two filo makers to prepare razor thin sheets for baklava, and the relatively thicker sheets used for börek. Fresh and frozen versions are prepared for commercial markets.

== Use ==
When using filo to make pastries, the thin layers are made by first rolling out the sheets of dough to the final thickness, then brushing them with oil, or melted butter for some desserts, and stacking them. This contrasts with puff pastry and croissant doughs, where the layers are stacked into a thick layer of dough, then folded and rolled out multiple times to produce a laminated dough containing thin layers of dough and fat.

Filo can be used in many ways: layered, folded, rolled, or ruffled, with various fillings.

=== List of filo-based pastries ===
Filo is used in a wide variety of dishes, including:

- Baklava – dessert made with layers of filo, chopped nuts, and syrup or honey.
- Banitsa – A Bulgarian dish consisting of eggs, cheese and filo baked in the oven.
- Börek – A savory filo pie.
- Bougatsa – A type of Greek breakfast pastry.
- Bülbül yuvası – A Middle eastern dessert with pistachios and syrup.
- Bundevara – A Serbian sweet pie filled with pumpkin.
- Flia – An Albanian dish consisting of multiple crêpe-like layers brushed with cream and served with sour cream.
- Galaktoboureko – A dessert consisting of filo and muhallebi.
- Gibanica – A Balkan dish made from filo, white cheese, and eggs.
- Pastizz – A savory pastry from Malta filled with ricotta or mushy peas.
- Savory spinach pie – pastry layered with spinach, egg, and cheese, eaten throughout the Balkans, Greece, and Turkey
- Tiropita – A Greek dish similar to Börek, filled with a cheese–egg mixture.
- Zelnik – A savory pie from the Balkans.
- Jabukovača – Bosnian pastry made of filo dough stuffed with apples.
- Pastilla – Moroccan pie made of thin Warqa dough stuffed with either chicken, seafood or lamb.
- Warbat – Jordanian and Syrian dessert consisting of layers of dough and semolina custard.

== Comparison to similar pastries ==
There are several similar foods similar to filo that are frequently confused with filo:

- Maghrebi malsouka (AKA warqa or brik sheets): Malsouka thicker than filo and is made by cooking a semolina-based dough on a hot pan.
- Turkish yufka: Yufka is an unleavened bread cooked on a saj, thicker than filo sheets, and may sometimes differ in ingredients.
- Güllaç wafers: Güllaç wafers are made by pouring a starch-based wafer of a hot saj.
  - In Egyptian Arabic, phyllo is referred to as "Güllaç dough" (عجين جلاش).

== See also ==
- Flaky pastry
- Puff pastry
- Samosa
- Strudel
- Wonton
- Yufka
