= Bougatsa =

Breakfast pastry in Greece

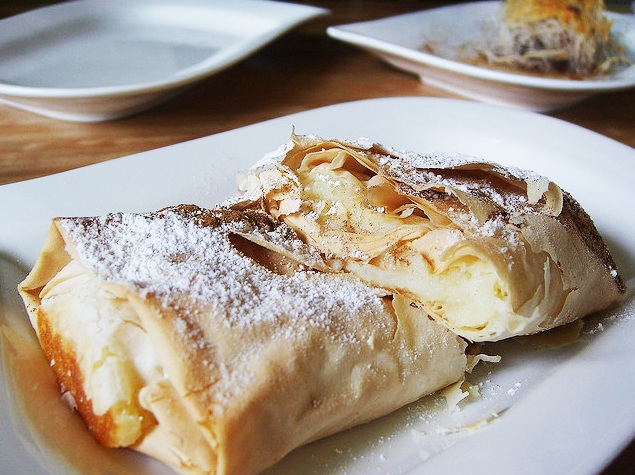
- Bougatsa with cream filling made in Thessaloniki
- Type: Pastry
- Place of origin: Greece
- Main ingredients: Phyllo; filling of semolina custard, cheese or something else

Bougatsa, bugatsa, bogatsa or boogatsa (Greek: μπουγάτσα [buˈɣatsa]) is a Greek breakfast food (sweet or savoury), or mid-morning snack, or midday snack. Bougatsa has several versions with their own filling, with the most popular the bougatsa krema (bougatsa cream) that has semolina custard filling used as a sweet food and dessert.

== Name ==
The name comes from the Byzantine Greek πογάτσα (pogátsa), from the ancient Roman pānis focācius, literally 'hearth bread'; comparable with the Italian "focaccia".

== Origin ==
It may have had a classical origin in the Ancient Greek/Roman placenta cake. A similar dessert is still known as placenta (Greek: πλατσέντα) on the island of Lesbos in Greece. Placenta is a type of pancake, made from two layers of dough, usually filled with cottage cheese. Sometimes chocolate or apples are used instead. The cake is covered with honey, before being baked.

Bougatsa was a staple of the Cappadocian Greeks in the Byzantine Empire. Its modern version originated in Northern Greece, in particular the cities of Serres and Thessaloniki. Today, bougatsa can be found in Greece in specialty shops called bougatsadika or bougatsopolia, selling bougatsa exclusively.

The taste of bougatsa varies between regions of Greece. For example, bougatsa cream in Veria is very sweet and full of cream, while in Thessaloniki the bougatsa cream is crunchy and not that sweet, and in Crete the bougatsa cheese is made of local mizithra cheese (not sweet) but sprinkled with sugar and cinnamon. Similarly to Veria, the bougatsa cream in Athens is sweet and full of cream.

== Preparation ==
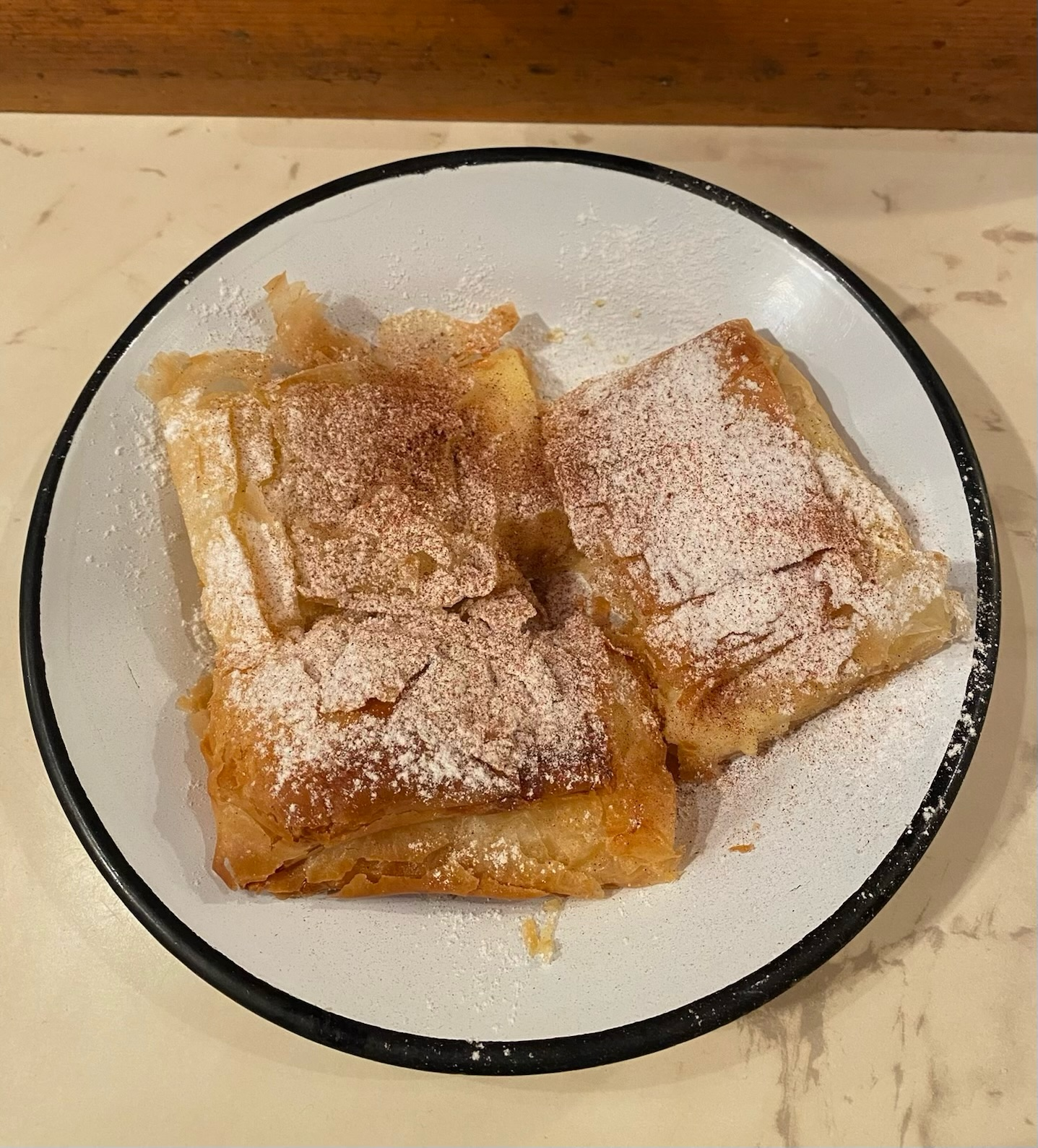
Finished bougatsa with custard filling

Preparation of custard bougatsa in an Athens cafe

Traditional Greek bougatsa is prepared from hand-made phyllo dough wrapped around a filling. After it is baked about 30–35 minutes in the oven, it is cut into small pieces and served hot on a small plate. The bougatsa cream is filled with semolina custard; it is then cut into small pieces and served hot, topped with lightly dusted powdered icing sugar and/or cinnamon. The bougatsa recipe parts are: preparing the custard filling; placing about 5 sheets of buttered phyllo pastry (also known as filo) in a baking dish; assembling the bougatsa; preheating the oven to the correct temperature and baking until the phyllo dough reaches the desired golden-brown crispness; cutting the bougatsa while still hot into small portions and serving.

Most modern bougatsa is made with machine-made phyllo, but some cafes and bakeries selling hand-made bougatsa still exist, especially in smaller towns and villages of Greece.

There are several bougatsa food versions which have their own filling, with the most known being:

- Bougatsa cream, that has semolina custard, that is a sweet food and dessert
- Bougatsa cheese, with feta cheese that is a savoury food
- Bougatsa cheese, with mizithra cheese
- Bougatsa chocolate cream
- Bougatsa apple
- Bougatsa potato purée
- Bougatsa spinach
- Bougatsa mix of spinach and feta cheese
- Bougatsa minced meat, usually a mix of beef and pork or beef and lamb

== In popular culture ==
The process of making bougatsa by hand-made filo was featured on an episode of Anthony Bourdain: No Reservations filmed in Chania, Crete.

== See also ==
- Banitsa, a similar pie from Bulgaria
- Cremeschnitte
- Galaktoboureko
- Knafeh
- List of custard desserts
- Pogača
- Spanakopita, a pie made with spinach and sometimes cheese
- Tyropita, a pie made with cheese
