= Brik =

Deep-fried pastry in North African cuisine

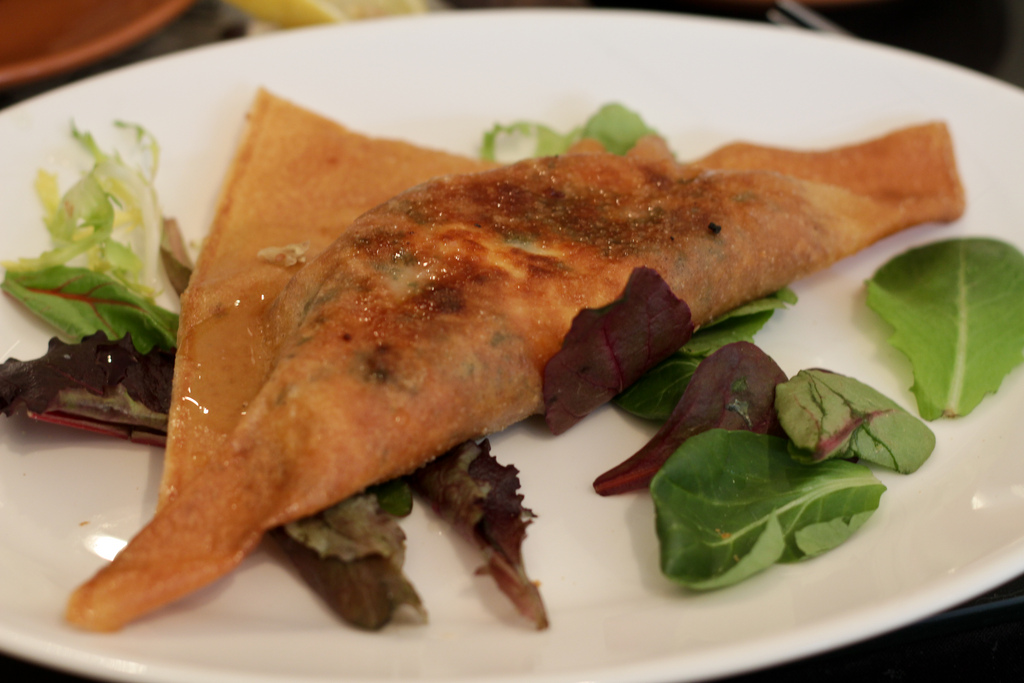
- Associated cuisine: Tunisian}}
- Main ingredients: Eggs, pastry

Brik (/briːk/ BREEK; بريك) or burek is the North African version of borek, a stuffed malsouka pastry which is commonly deep fried. The best-known version is the egg brik, a whole egg in a triangular pastry pocket with chopped onion, tuna, harissa and parsley. With a slightly different shape, but with identical ingredients and method of preparation, It is often filled with a raw egg and herbs or tuna, harissa and olives and is sometimes served in a pita.

Brik pastry is made by slapping a sticky lump of dough onto a hot non-stick surface in overlapping circles to produce the desired size and cooked for a short amount of time. The brik dough sheets are called malsouka or warka. Typical fillings include tuna, ground meat, raw egg, chicken, or anchovies garnished with harissa, capers, or cheese.

== Regional variants and preparation ==
Although the food's origins are hard to trace directly, it dates back at least 500 years in the past. In addition to its unclear origins, it is also not known by a singular name; across the Middle East even now, the popular food can be referred to as bric, börek, burek, warqa or malsouka. The common ingredients in every brik – regardless of what it is called – include the deep fried pastry crust and proteins (like tuna or egg) encased within the wrapping, such as the common French spin known as brik a l'oeuf.

To prepare a classic Tunisian Brik, one must fold the outer pastry into triangle shapes, stuff the mixed ingredients into the wrapper, and then heat them in a frying pan for two to three minutes on each side.

== See also ==
- List of Middle Eastern dishes
