= Sütlü Nuriye =

Milk baklava

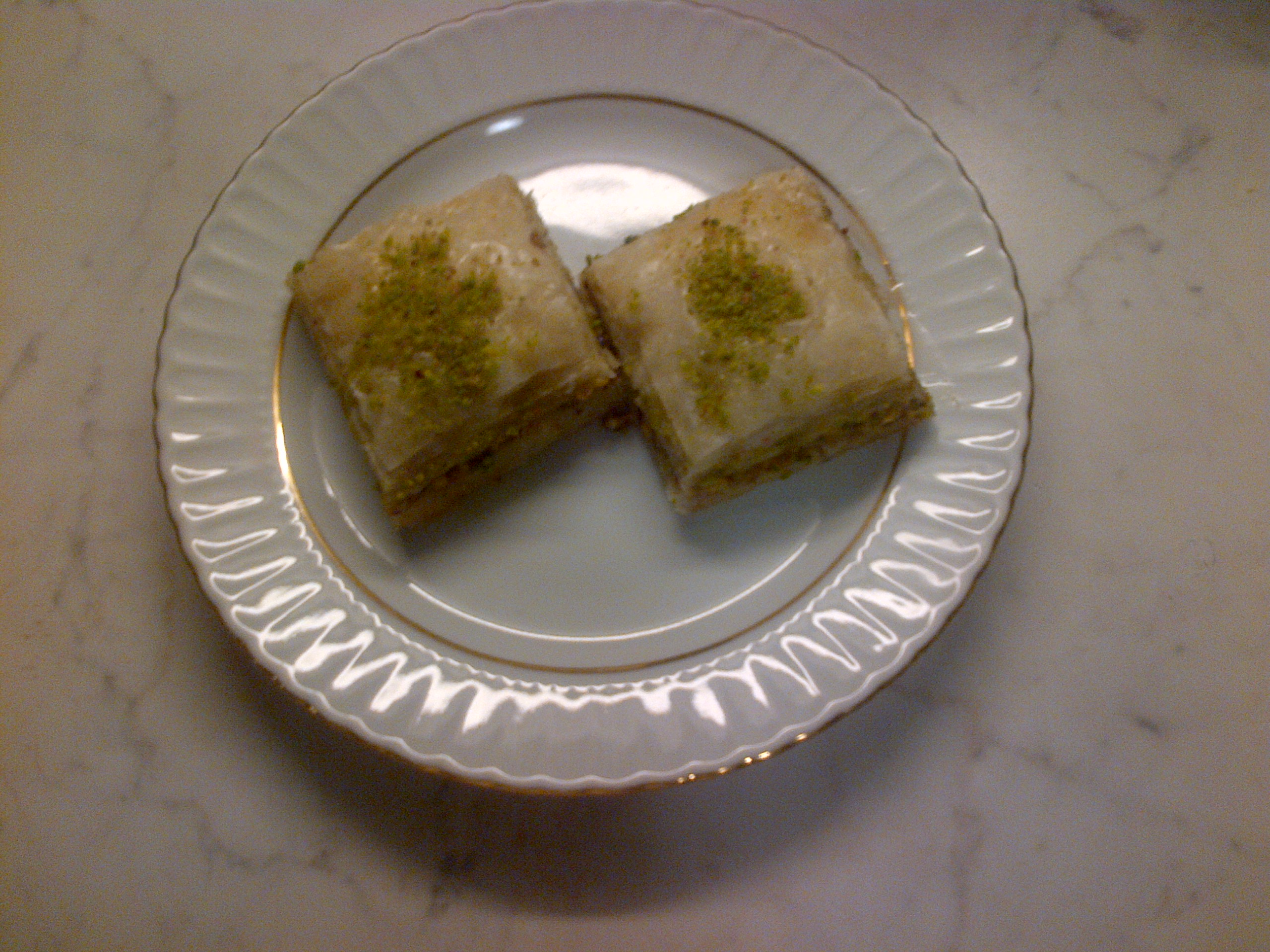
- Course: Dessert
- Place of origin: Turkey
- Main ingredients: Dough, butter, hazelnuts or walnuts; sugar, water, lemon juice, milk

Sütlü Nuriye (Milky Nuriye) is a Turkish dessert similar to baklava, but instead of syrup it contains milk, which gives a whitish look to the dessert. The name means Nuriye (Turkish female name) with milk. It is considered a speciality of Diyarbakir.

== History ==
The dessert is said to have origins in Ottoman cuisine. According to Süheyl Ünver, who authored the foundational book of post-Ottoman Turkish cuisine called Tarihte 50 Türk Yemeği (50 historical Turkish foods), an 18th-century recipe was recorded by a judge from the Ottoman city of İzmir. The dough for this dessert is made with egg whites and usually contains some acidic ingredient like lemon juice or vinegar, and the finished dessert is layered various ways.

The modern form of the dessert was created during the 1980 Turkish coup d'état during which a military officer purchased baklava and found the price to be too high. The officer complained to İsmail Hakki Akansel, who had been appointed Mayor of Istanbul in the aftermath of the coup. Akansel responded by setting a price ceiling on baklava, which was announced during Ramadan. The pastry shop was unable to make the traditional baklava recipe profitable under the new pricing rules. To lower the cost of making baklava, pastry chefs substituted hazelnuts for pistachios and added milk to increase the weight of each tray of baklava. The new recipe became known as Sütlü Nuriye.

== See also ==
- Bülbül yuvası
- Şöbiyet
