= Bundevara =

Pumpkin pastry

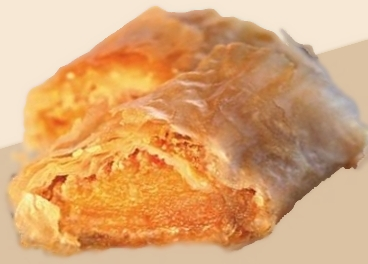
- Alternative names: Tikvenik
- Type: Sweet pie
- Course: Appetizer, dessert
- Serving temperature: Hot or cold
- Main ingredients: Pumpkin, phyllo

Bundevara (Serbian: Бундевара) is a pastry with pumpkin. Bundevara is associated with the Serbian cuisine and the autumn season. It is a lenten dish. The dish was mentioned as early as in 1904 in the newspaper Zastava. It should not be confused with the pumpkin pie. It is made of rolled phyllo; regular sugar, vanilla sugar, cinnamon, butter or oil, and eggs are used as its ingredients. The newspaper Danas wrote that there is an American variation of bundevara that uses shortcrust dough and pumpking filling.

== See also ==
- List of pies
- List of squash and pumpkin dishes
