= Pastilla =

North African pie made from meat and layered pastry dough

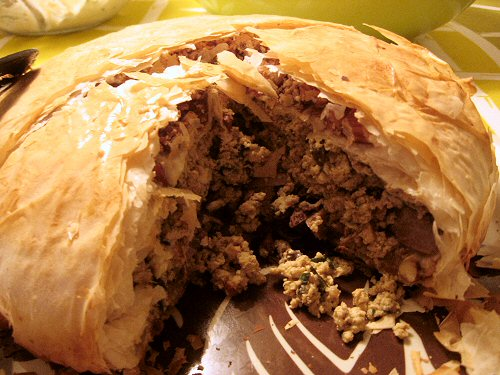
- Alternative names: Bastilla, basṭīla, r’zeema, tajik, malsouka
- Type: Meat pie
- Region or state: Maghreb
- Associated cuisine: Morocco; Algeria; Tunisia
- Main ingredients: Warka dough, broth, spices; squab, chicken, fish or offal

Pastilla (Arabic: بسطيلة, romanized: basṭīla, also called a bastilla or an North African pie) is a meat or seafood pie in Maghrebi cuisine made with warqa dough (ورقة), which is similar to filo. It is a specialty of Morocco, Algeria, (Note: While Bouhlila acknowledges that most Tetouanis consider bastila to be Andalusi, he suggests that the word itself is of Turkish origin and arrived with the Algerians." [...] "Bouhlila's study corroborated the theory that the paper-thin ouarka used to make bastila, as well as the name of the dish itself, were introduced to Morocco by way of Tetouani cuisine sometime after 1830.") and Tunisia, where its variation is known as malsouka. It has more recently been spread by emigrants to France, Israel, and North America.

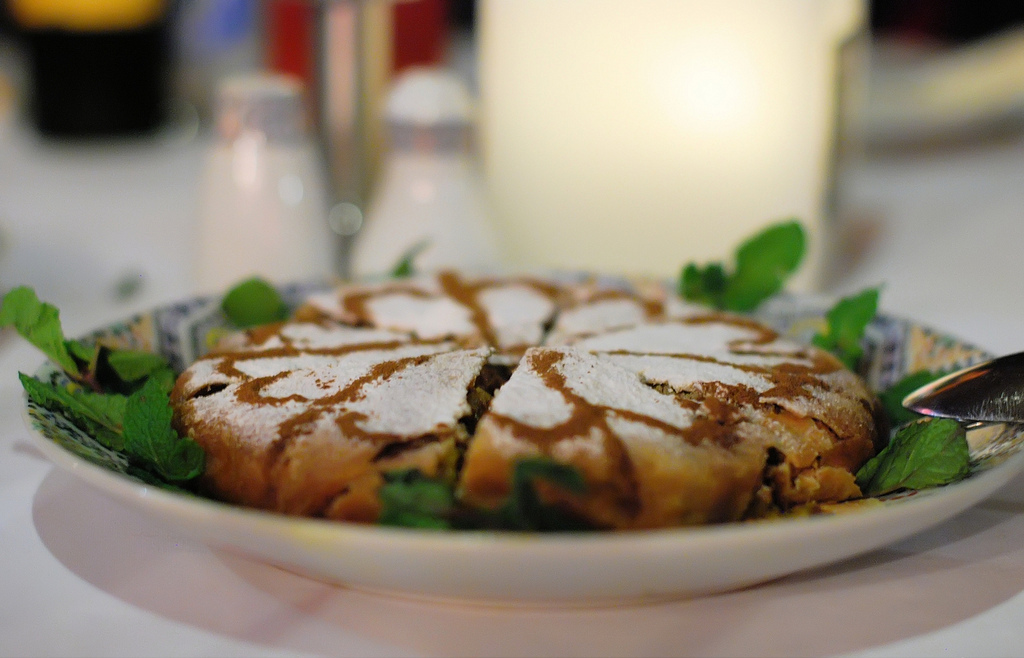
Poultry pastilla ornately dusted with powdered sugar and cinnamon

== History ==
The name of the pie comes from the Spanish word pastilla, meaning either "pill" or "small pastry", with a change of p to b common in Arabic. The historian Anny Gaul attests to recipes that bear "a strong resemblance to the stuffing that goes inside modern-day bastila" in 13th century Andalusi cookbooks, such as ibn Razīn al-Tujībī's فضالة الخوان في طيبات الطعام والألوان fuḍālat al-k̲iwān fī ṭayyibāti ṭ-ṭaʿāmi wa-l-ʾalwāni. This recipe, in Gaul's words, calls for "cooking pigeon with cinnamon, almonds, saffron, onion, and eggs, as well as a double-cooking process similar to today's conventional recipe, by which the ingredients are first cooked in a pot and then finished in the oven."

The historian Idriss Bouhlila lists the dish as one of the Ottoman Algerian foods that affected Tetuani cuisine as a result of Algerian migration to Tétouan in the aftermath of the French invasion of Algiers in 1830, while acknowledging those who consider the dish to be of Andalusi origin. Bouhlila's study corroborated Gaul's theory that the name of the dish, which according to Bouhlila is of Turkish origin, as well as the werqa used to make it, arrived with the Algerian migrants to Tétouan, and spread from there to the rest of Morocco sometime after 1830. Furthermore, Ahmed al-Rahouni stated that pastilla is of Ottoman origin in his book Umdat al-Rawin fi Tarikh Tatawin (The Guide of Narrators in the History of Tetouan). Historians believe that the dish entered northern Morocco through Ottoman Algeria as a result of the relations between the two regions in the 18th and 19th century, according to historians this may explain why many inhabitants of northern Morocco called the dish Turkish.

According to Ken Albala, the basic concept of the pastilla was likely brought to Morocco by Muslims who left al-Andalus in the 16th century or earlier because there had been considerable traffic with Morocco since Muslim conquest of the Iberian Peninsula in the seventh century.

According to historian of Jewish food Gil Marks, pastilla was brought to Morocco by Sephardic Jews and, after filo reached the Maghreb in the Ottoman era, cooks substituted it for Andalusi-style pastry. Sephardim continued to pronounce the name with "p", while Arabic speakers substituted a "b".

In Morocco, pastilla is generally served as a starter at the beginning of special meals, and in one of two forms: one with poultry and one with seafood. In Algeria, pastilla is usually made with chicken or with pigeon.

== Poultry pastilla ==
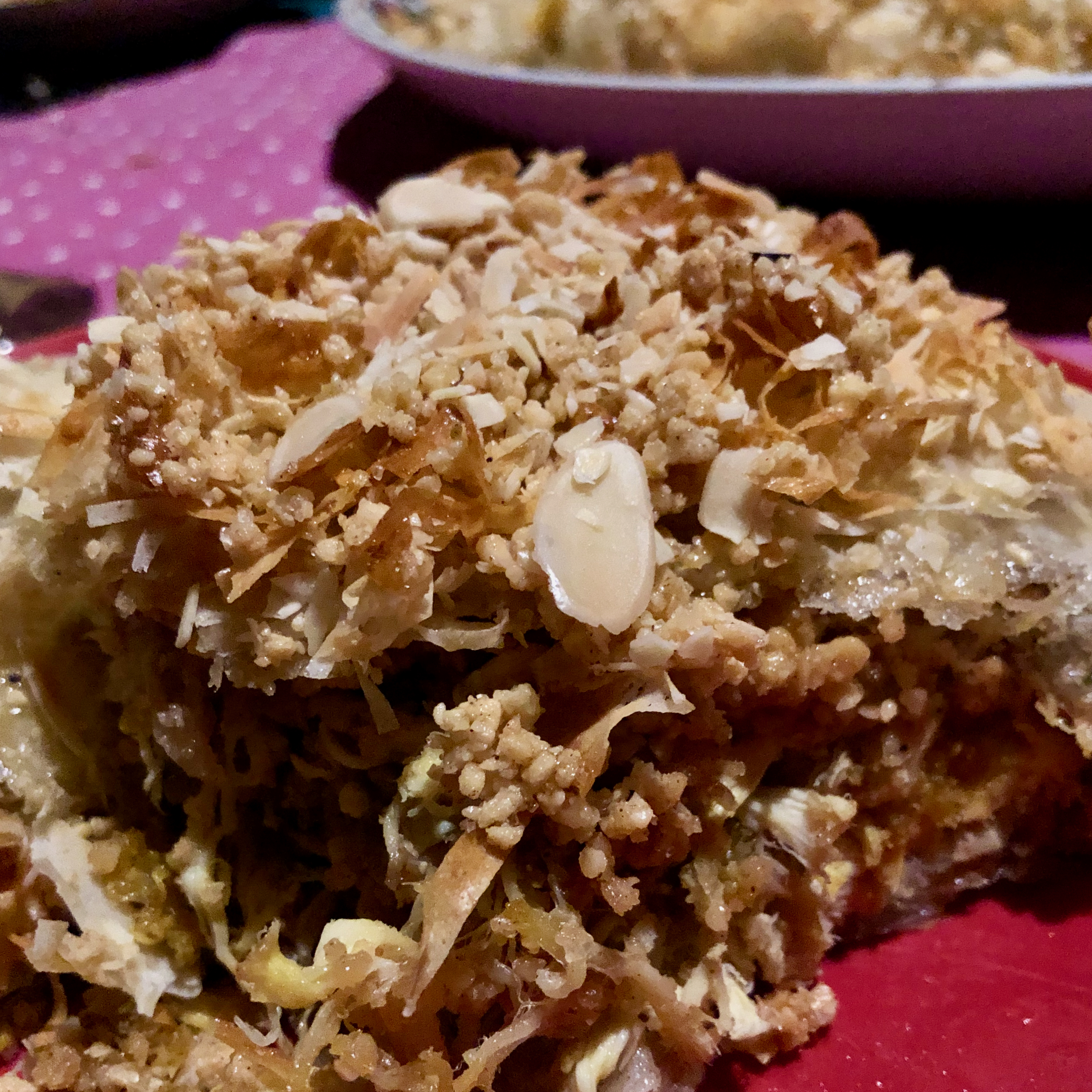
A slice of chicken pastilla

Poultry pastilla was traditionally made of squab (fledgling pigeons), but shredded chicken is more often used today. It combines sweet and savoury flavours: crisp layers of the crêpe-like werqa, savory meat slow-cooked in broth and spices and then shredded, and a crunchy layer of toasted and ground almonds, cinnamon, and sugar. The filling is made by browning the poultry in butter. Chopped onions, water, parsley, and various spices including saffron are added and the meat is simmered until tender. When cool, the meat is deboned and the flesh shredded. The liquid is reduced and thickened with eggs to form a custard-like sauce. Meat and custard are often prepared a day ahead.

Blanched almonds are fried in oil, then crushed finely and mixed with powdered sugar and cinnamon. In a round baking pan, several pieces of the thin werqa are layered, each brushed with melted butter, and overhanging the edge of the pan. The cook adds the egg mixture, places another buttered sheet of dough over it, adds the shredded meat, also covered with a sheet of dough, and then the almond mixture is added. The overlapping pieces of dough are folded over the filling, and another two pieces of buttered dough are added and tucked in around the edges of the pie. The pie is baked until heated through and the layers of dough are brown. Powdered sugar and cinnamon are sprinkled over the top before serving hot.

== Seafood pastilla ==
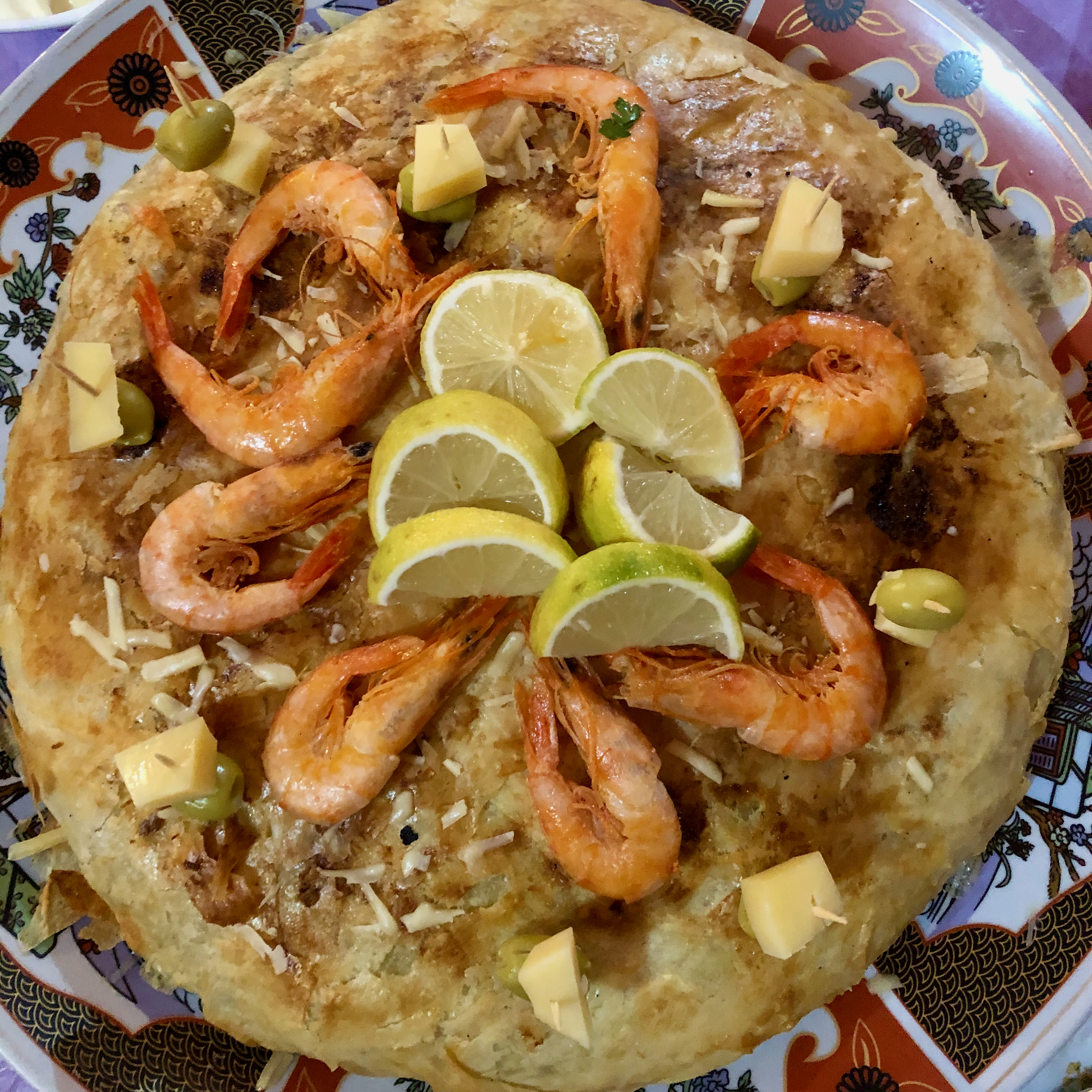
Seafood pastilla served in a home in Casablanca

Seafood pastilla (Moroccan Arabic: بسطيلة الحوت, romanized: basṭīlat el-ḥūt) usually contains fish and other seafood, in addition to vermicelli. Unlike poultry pastilla, seafood pastilla is not sweet, but spicy.

Whereas poultry pastilla is dusted with powdered sugar and cinnamon, seafood pastilla is usually dressed with a light sprinkle of shredded cheese and a few slices of lemon. This version of pastilla is often served at Moroccan weddings.

== Pastilla with milk ==
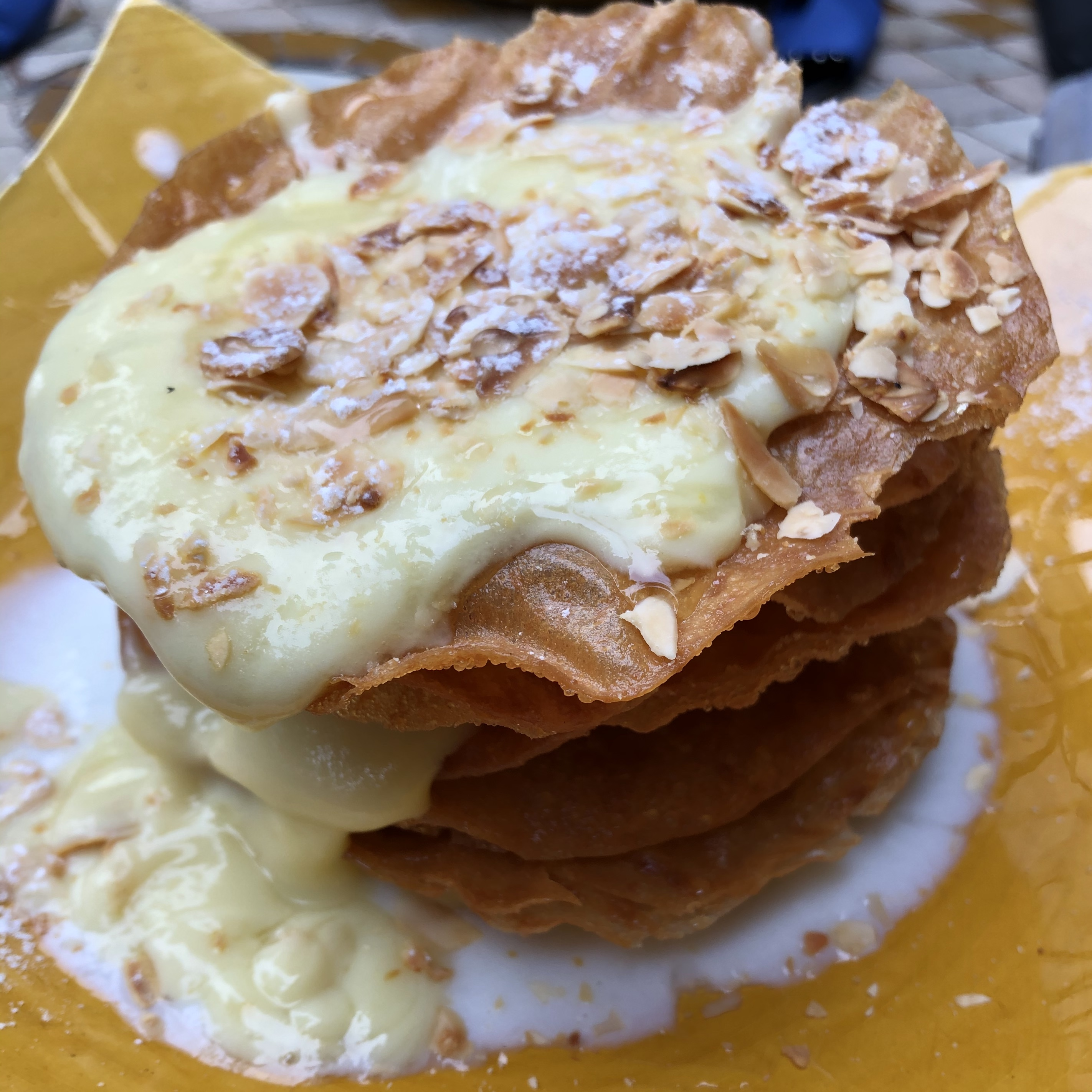
Jawhara (جوهرة), a Moroccan dessert typical of Fes, with fried waraq pastry, cream, orange blossom water, and toasted almond slices

In the traditional Fassi cuisine, pastilla can also be served as a dessert, in which case, the pastilla is called jowhara (جوهرة, jewel) or "pastilla with milk". This pastilla is also made of warka and a milky cream put between the sheets. The jowhara is flavored with orange flower water and decorated with cinnamon and sugar.

== Sephardic Jewish version ==
Among Moroccan Jews, pastilla is made with olive oil or margarine rather than butter to follow the laws of kashrut, which specifically prohibit eating dairy products and meat together.

In the Jewish Moroccan cuisine of Casablanca, pastilla includes browned onions in the filling. Modern Israeli adaptations sometimes use phyllo sheets and shape the dish into cigars.

An increasingly popular variant makes individual pastries rather than large pies.

== See also ==
- Moroccan cuisine
- Algerian cuisine
- List of Moroccan dishes
- List of Middle Eastern dishes
- List of pies, tarts and flans
- Andalusian cuisine
- Sephardic Jewish cuisine
- Berber cuisine
- Pigeon pie
