= Dilber dudağı =

Turkish dessert

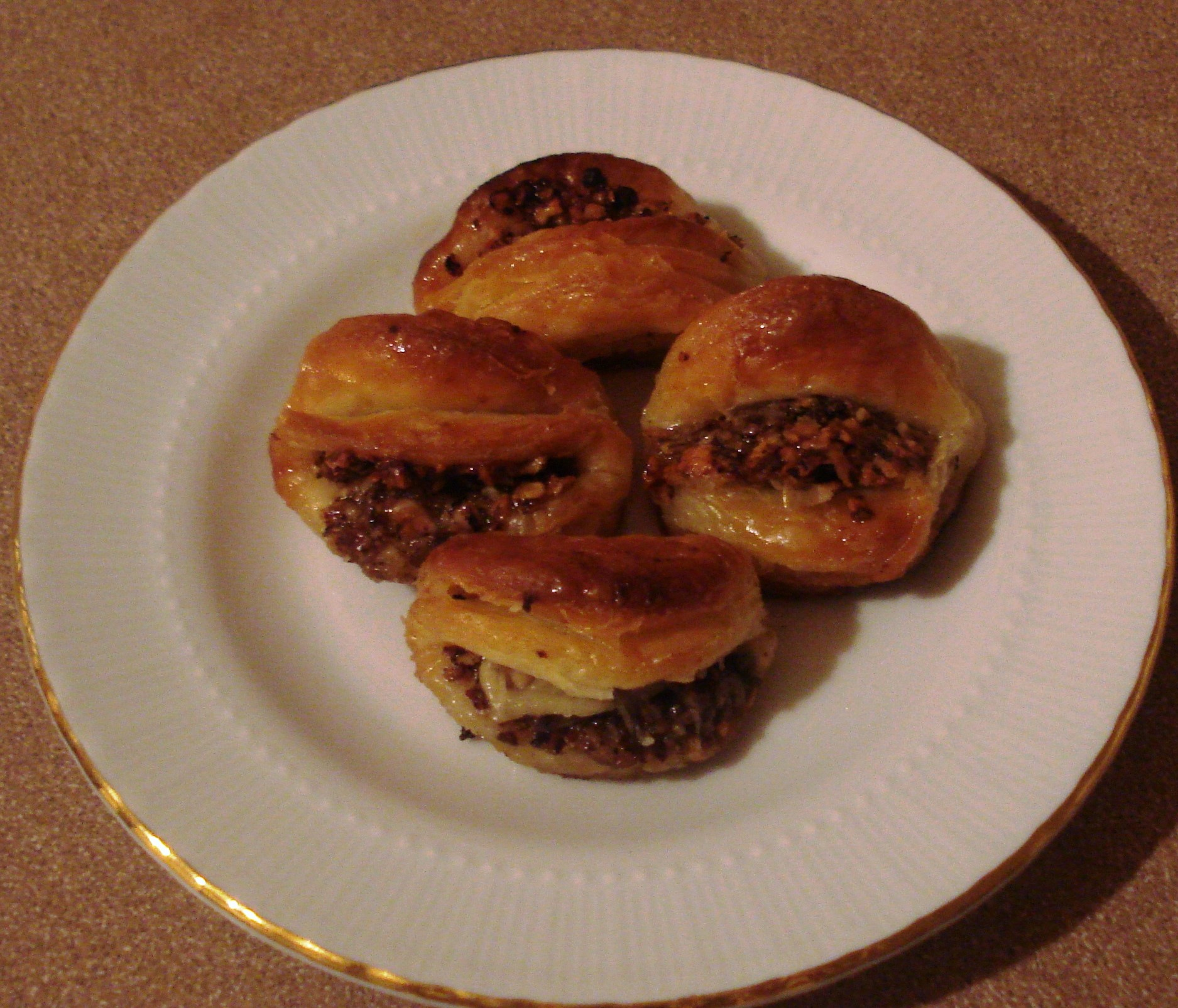
- Type: Dessert
- Place of origin: Turkey
- Main ingredients: Egg, yogurt, milk, butter, sunflower oil, baking powder, lemon, flour, sugar and water.

Dilber dudağı (lit. 'beloved's lip or sweetheart's lip' in Turkish; Ottoman Turkish: دلبر طوداغی) is a Turkish dessert. The ingredients are egg, yogurt, milk, butter, sunflower oil, baking powder, lemon, flour, sugar, water.

== See also ==
- Şekerpare
- Revani
- Baklava
- Tulumba
