= Turkish Patent and Trademark Office =

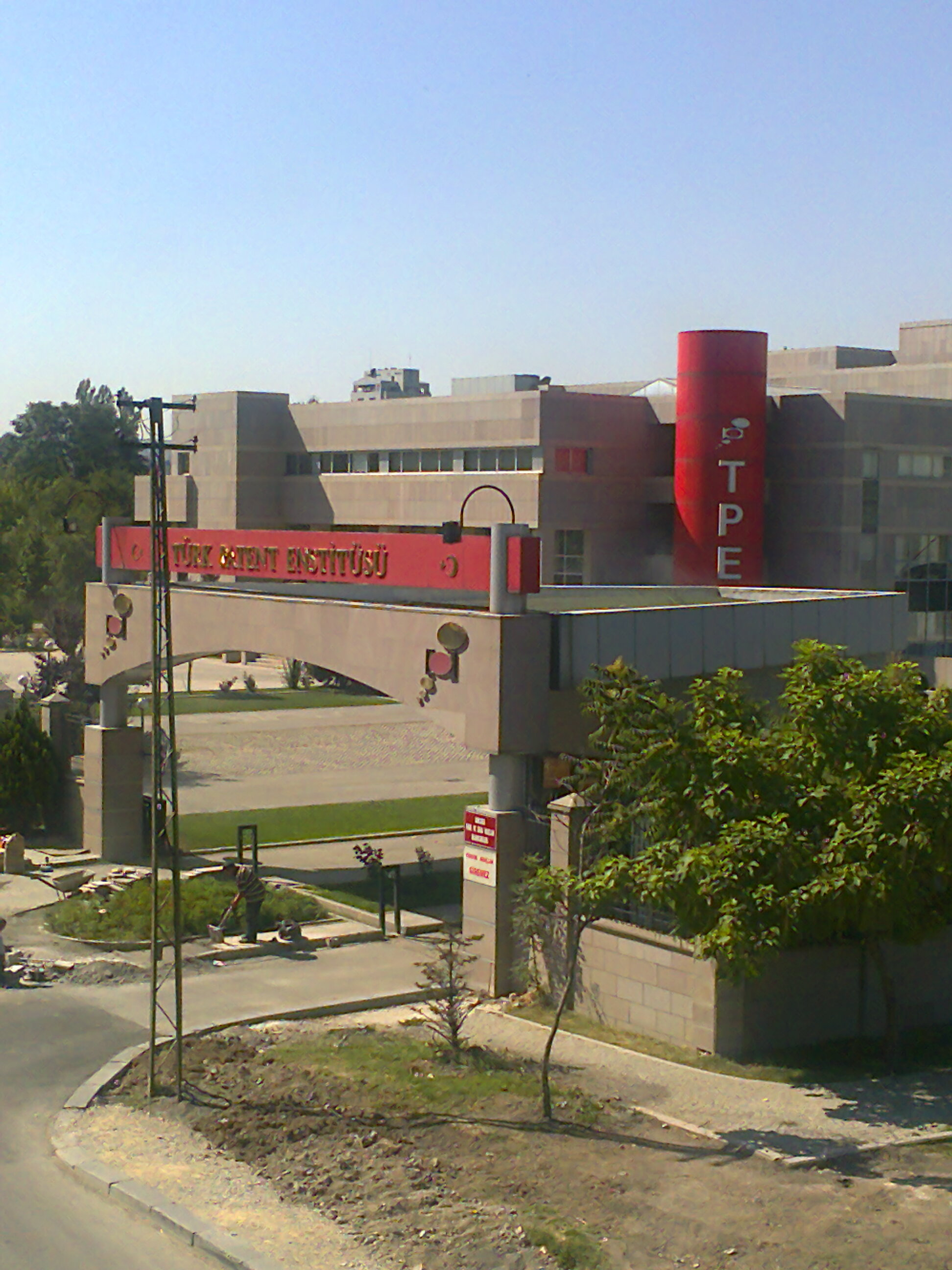
- TURKPATENT Building
- Abbreviation: TURKPATENT
- Formation: June 24, 1994
- Type: Governmental agency
- Purpose: Intellectual property
- Headquarters: Hipodrom Cad. 115, Yenimahalle
- Location: Ankara, Turkey
- Coordinates: 39.94676°N 32.82773°E Turkish Patent and Trademark Office (Turkey)
- Region served: Turkey
- Parent organization: Ministry of Industry and Technology
- Website: www.turkpatent.gov.tr/TURKPATENT/

The Turkish Patent and Trademark Office (Turkish: Türk Patent ve Marka Kurumu or TÜRKPATENT) (TURKPATENT) is an intellectual property organization with a special budget being attached to the Ministry of Industry and Technology of the Republic of Turkey. Established on June 24, 1994, in Ankara as an independent legal entity, it is liable under special judiciary provisions with the objective of supporting the technological development in Turkey and of establishing and protecting of industrial property rights, as well as providing the public with the worldwide information on industrial property rights.

In October 2016, the Turkish Patent and Trademark Office has been appointed as International Searching and Preliminary Examining Authority under the Patent Cooperation Treaty (PCT). As of October 2016, the appointment was not effective yet.

== Organs and administrative units ==
1. Managing Board
2. Advisory Board
3. Presidency
4. Re-examination and Evaluation Board
5. Main Administrative Units
6. Auxiliary Service Units
7. Consultancy Units
