= List of desserts =

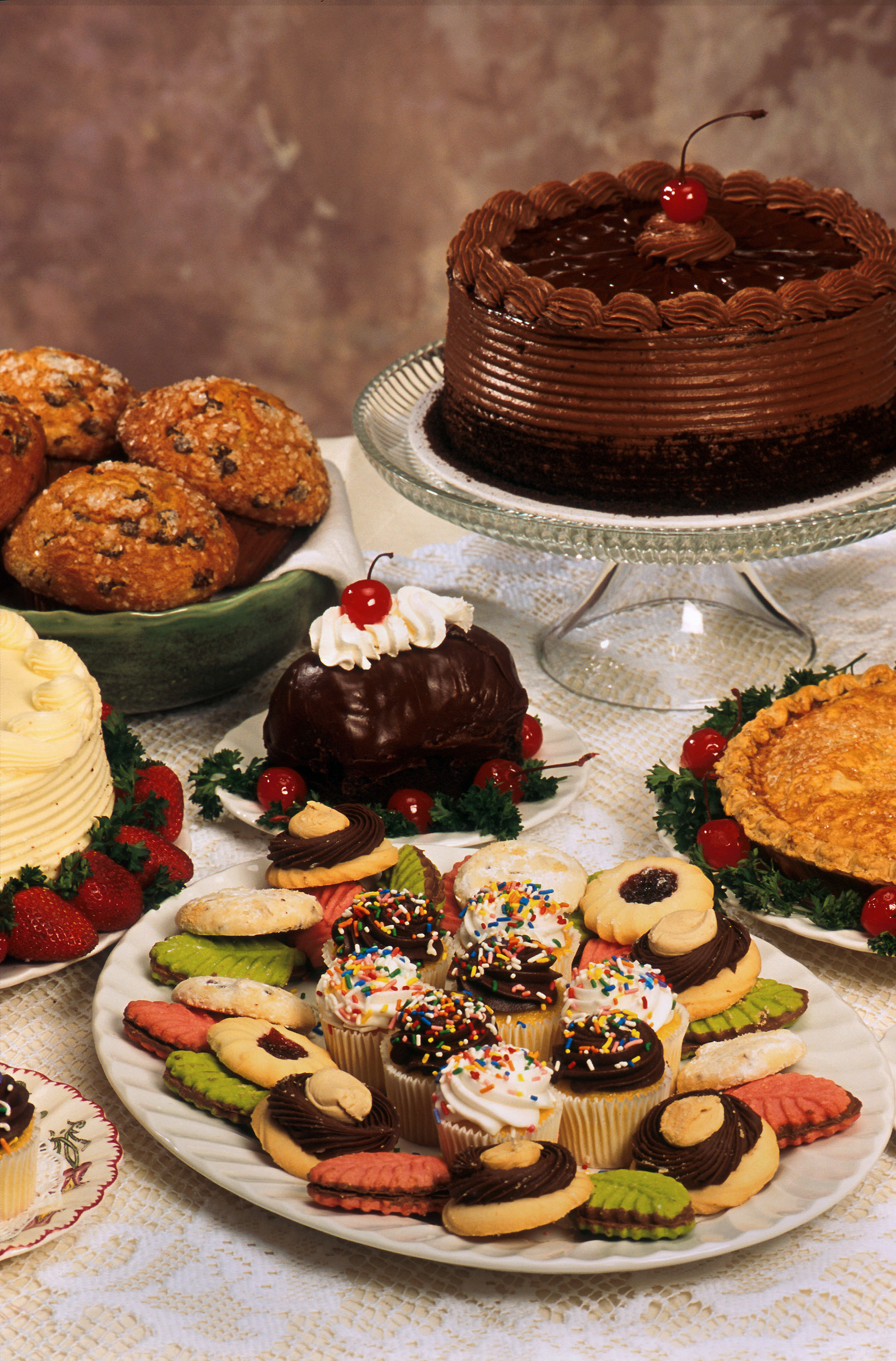
An assortment of desserts.

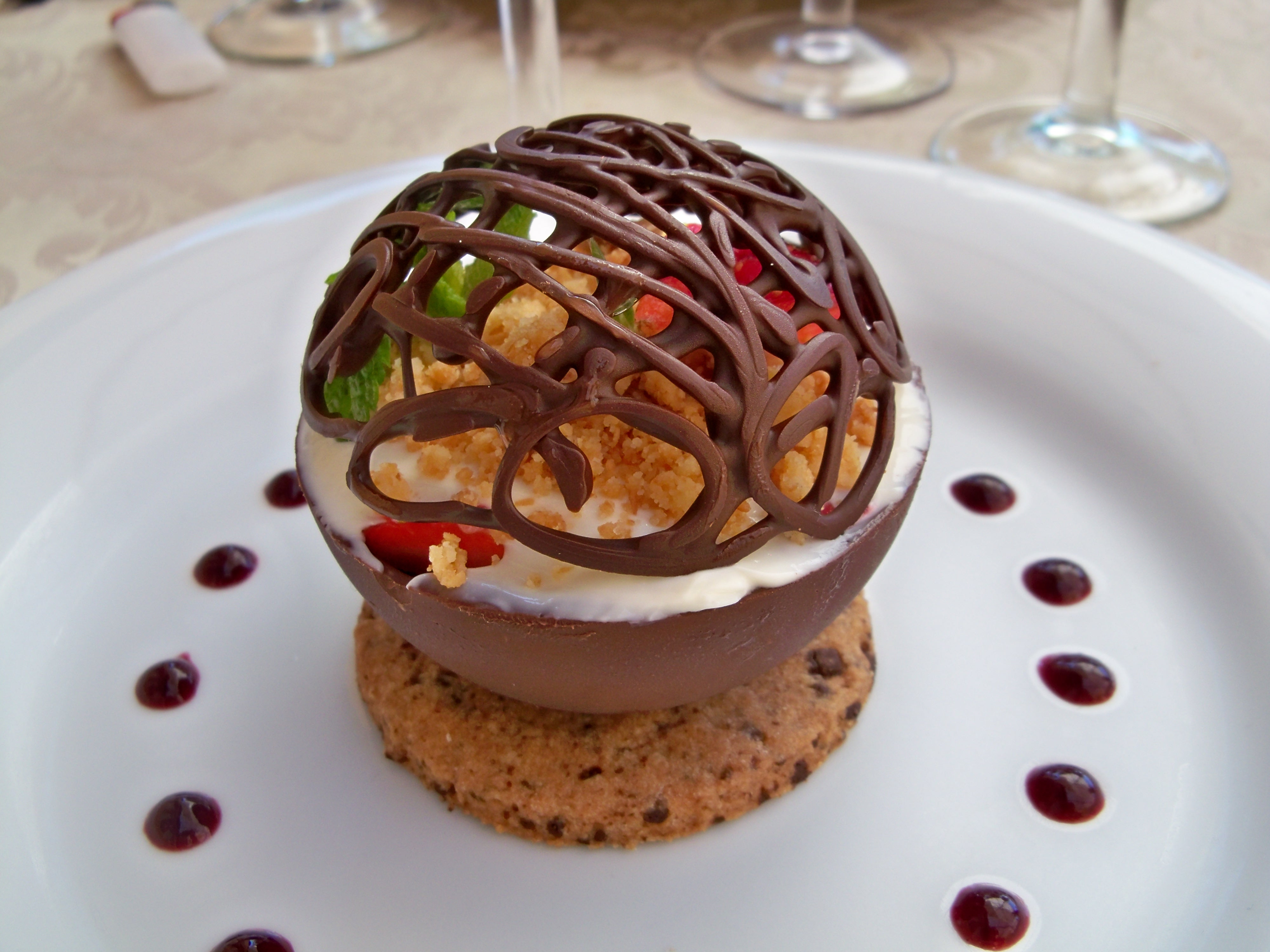
A chocolate-strawberry crumble ball.

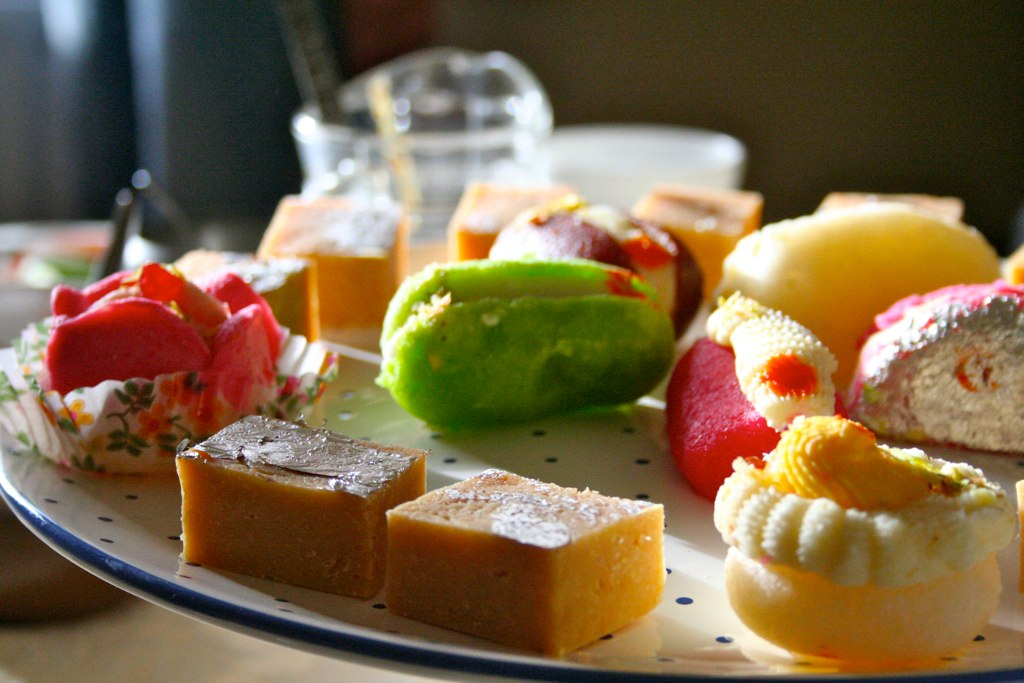
Indian confectionery desserts (known as mithai, or sweets in some parts of India). Sugar and desserts have a long history in India: by about 500 BC, people in India had developed the technology to produce sugar crystals. In the Sanskrit language, these crystals were called khanda (खण्ड), which is the source of the word candy.

A dessert is typically the sweet course that, after the entrée and main course, concludes a meal in the culture of many countries, particularly Western culture. The course usually consists of sweet foods, but may include other items. The word "dessert" originated from the French word desservir "to clear the table" and the negative of the Latin word servire. There are a wide variety of desserts in western cultures, including cakes, cookies, biscuits, gelatins, pastries, ice creams, pies, puddings, and candies. Fruit is also commonly found in dessert courses because of its natural sweetness. Many different cultures have their own variations of similar desserts around the world, such as in Russia, where many breakfast foods such as blini, oladyi, and syrniki can be served with honey and jam to make them popular as desserts.

== By type ==
=== Brand name desserts ===
A

- Angel Delight

B

- Bird's Custard
- Bompas & Parr
- Butter Braid

C

- Cherrybrook Kitchen
- Coppenrath & Wiese

D

- Dr. Oetker
- Dream Whip

E

- Eli's Cheesecake
- Entenmann's

J

- Jell-O
- Jell-O 1-2-3

M

- Milky (pudding)
- Mrs. Wagner's Pies
- My-T-Fine

P

- Pots & Co

Y

- YoGo
Brand name desserts

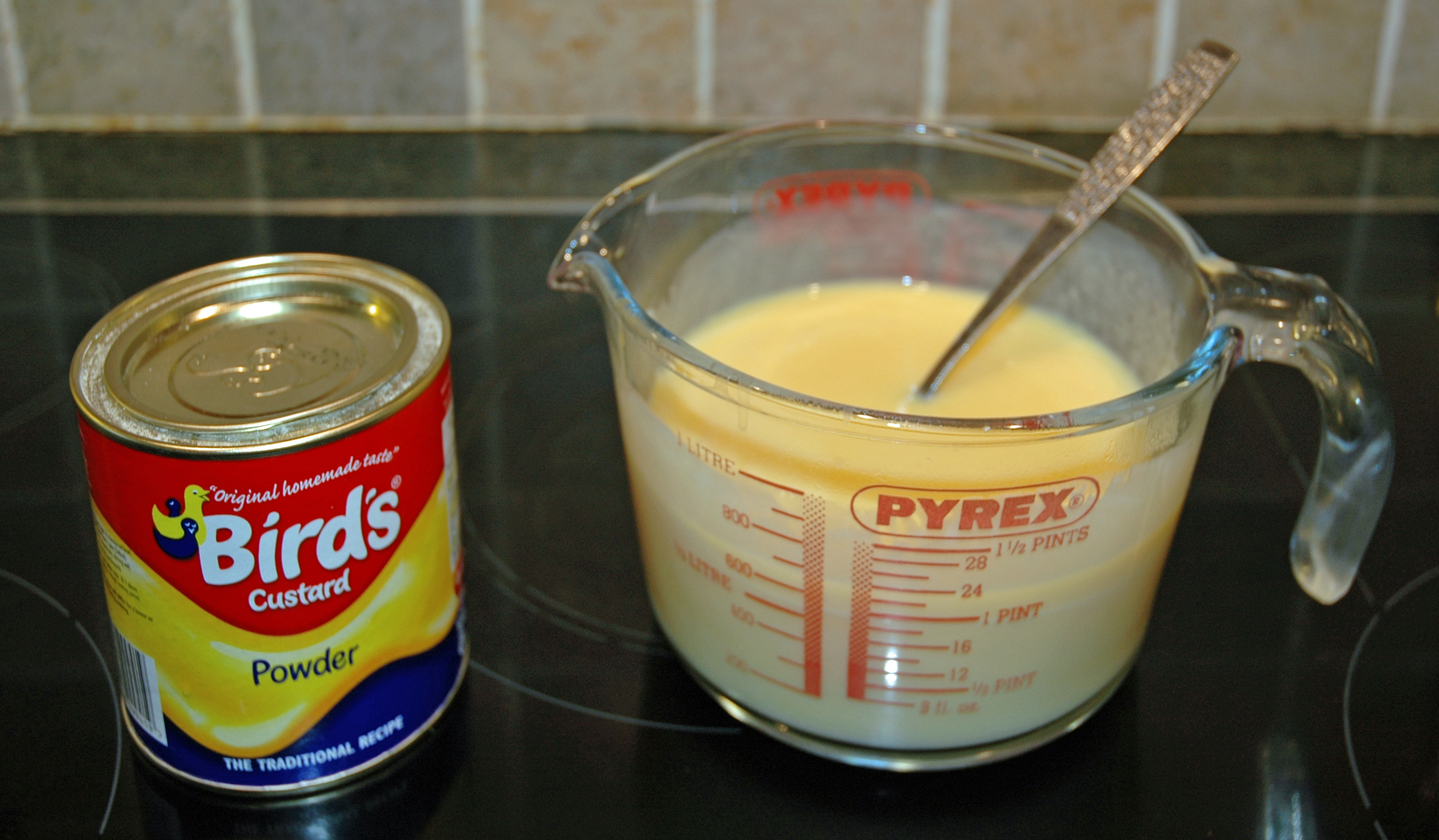
Bird's Custard

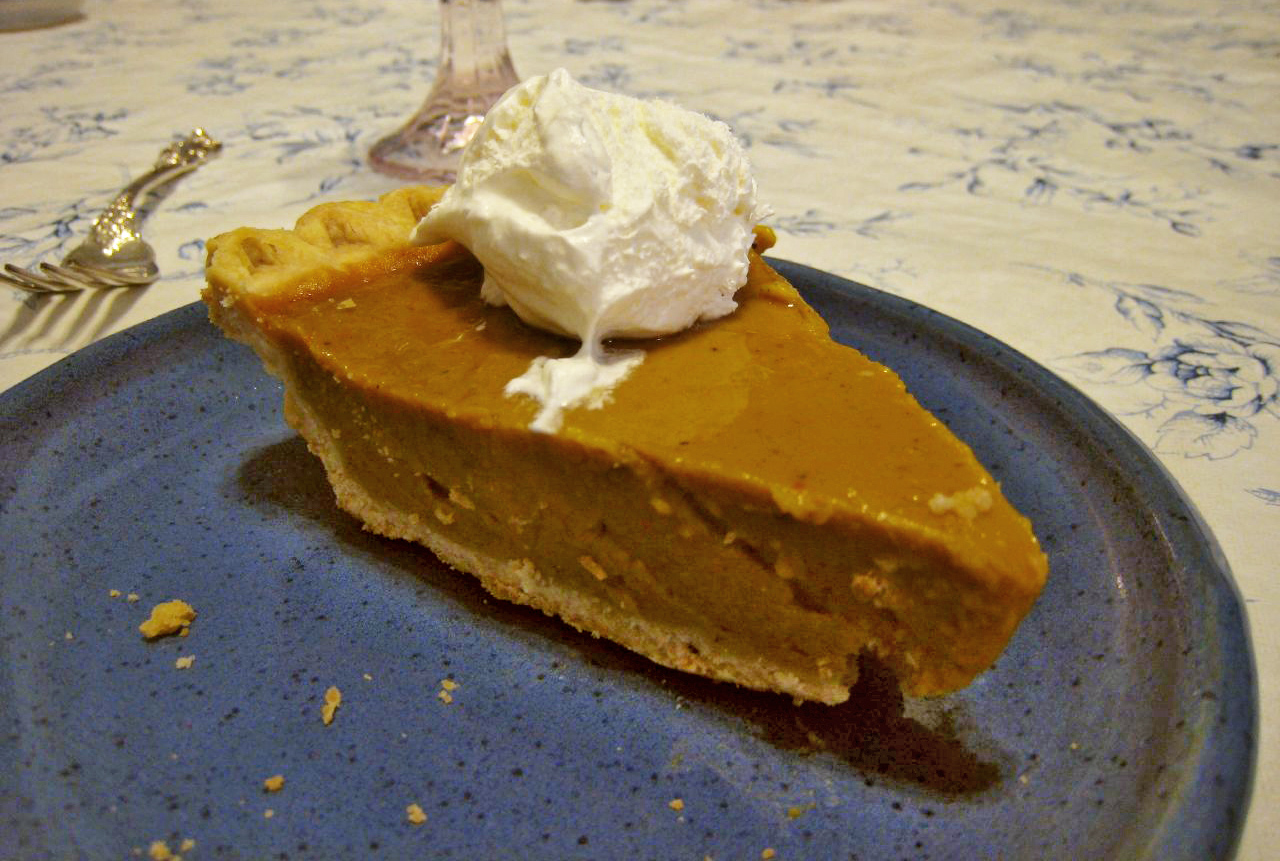
Pumpkin pie topped with Cool Whip

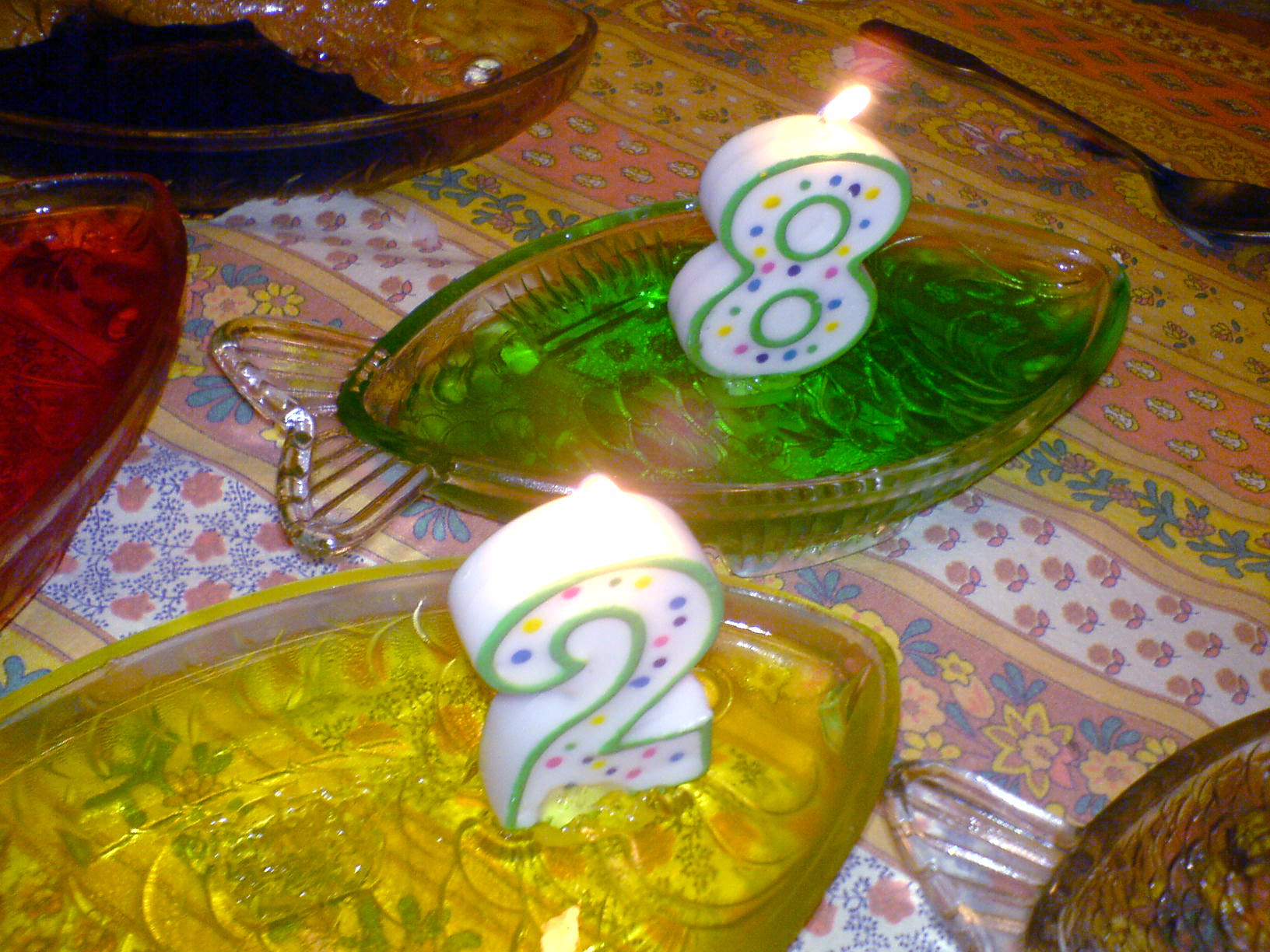
Jell-O

=== Cakes ===
Cake is a form of bread or bread-like food. In its modern forms, it is typically a sweet baked dessert. In its oldest forms, cakes were normally fried breads or cheesecakes, and normally had a disk shape. Modern cake, especially layer cakes, normally contain a combination of flour, sugar, eggs, and butter or oil, with some varieties also requiring liquid (typically milk or water) and leavening agents (such as yeast or baking powder).

A

- Allahabadi cake
- Allerheiligenstriezel
- Amandine
- Angel cake
- Angel food cake
- Apple cake
- Arany galuska

B

- Babka
- Banbury cake
- Bánh
- Bánh bò
- Bánh chuối
- Bánh da lợn
- Bánh khoai mì
- Bánh tét
- Battenberg cake
- Baumkuchen
- Berlingozzo
- Better than sex cake
- Bibingka
- Bika ambon
- Birthday cake
- Bizcocho
- Black bun
- Black Forest cake
- Blackout cake
- Blondie
- Bolo Rei
- Brownie
- Brookie
- Buccellato
- Buckwheat gateau
- Budapest roll
- Bulla cake
- Bundt cake
- Butter cake
- Butterkuchen

C

- Cake balls
- Cake pop
- Caraway seed cake
- Carrot cake
- Cassata
- Castella
- Chajá
- Chantilly cake
- Charlotte
- Cheesecake
- Chelsea bun
- Chiffon cake
- Chocolate cake
- Choco pie
- Chokladboll
- Chongyang cake
- Chorley cake
- Christmas cake
- Coconut cake
- Coffee cake
- Cupcake

D

- Dacquoise
- Depression cake
- Devil's food cake
- Dirt cake
- Doberge cake
- Dobos torte
- Donauwelle
- Dundee cake

E

- Eccles cake
- Eggies
- Eierschecke
- Esterházy torte

F

- Fanta cake
- Fat rascal
- Financier
- Flourless chocolate cake
- Foam cake
- Frankfurter Kranz
- Friand
- Frog cake
- Fruitcake
- Funing big cake

G

- Garash cake
- Genoa cake
- Genoise
- German chocolate cake
- Gingerbread
- Gingerbread house
- Gooey butter cake
- Groom's cake
- Gugelhupf
- Gulab jamun

H

- Happy cake
- Heavy cake
- Herman cake
- Hot milk cake
- Hummingbird cake

I

- Ice cream cake
- Imagawayaki

J

- Jaffa Cakes
- Jewish apple cake
- Ji dan gao
- Joffre cake

K

- Kalathappam
- Kek Lapis Sarawak
- Kentucky jam cake
- Kyiv cake
- King cake
- Kladdkaka
- Kornigou
- Kouign-amann
- Kransekake
- Kuchen
- Kue cubit

L

- Ladyfinger
- Lamington
- Lane cake
- Lardy cake
- Layer cake
- Lekach
- Linzer torte

M

- Madeira cake
- Madeleine
- Malt loaf
- Marble cake
- Mazurek
- Međimurska gibanica
- Molten chocolate cake

O

- Ontbijtkoek
- Opera

P

- Pain d'épices
- Pandan cake
- Panforte
- Panettone
- Panpepato
- Parkin
- Parrozzo
- Pastiera
- Petit four
- Pinca
- Ploatz
- Pound cake
- Prekmurska gibanica
- Princess cake
- Prinzregententorte
- Punschkrapfen
- Put chai ko

Q

- Queen cake

R

- Red bean cake
- Red velvet cake
- Rigó Jancsi
- Rock cake
- Rosca de reyes
- Rum baba
- Rum cake
- Ruske kape

S

- Sachertorte
- Šakotis
- Šampita
- Sesame seed cake
- Sfouf
- Sheet cake
- Simnel cake
- Snack cake
- Sno Balls
- Song gao
- Spanische Windtorte
- Spekkoek
- Spice cake
- Sponge cake
- St. Honoré cake
- Stack cake
- Stollen
- Streuselkuchen
- Swiss roll

T

- Tahinopita
- Taiyaki
- Tarta de Santiago
- Tea loaf
- Teacake
- Tipsy cake
- Tiramisu
- Torta monferrina
- Torta Balcarce
- Torta caprese
- Torta de nata
- Torta della nonna
- Torta delle rose
- Torta Maria Luisa
- Torta Tre Monti
- Torte
- Tottenham cake
- Tres leches cake
- Tu
- Tula pryanik
- Tunis cake
- Tunnock's teacake

U

- Upside-down cake

W

- Wacky cake
- Wafer
- Waffle
- Wedding cake
- Welsh cake
- White sugar sponge cake
- Wine cake

Y

- Yule log

Z

- Zuger Kirschtorte
- Zwetschgenkuchen
Dessert cakes

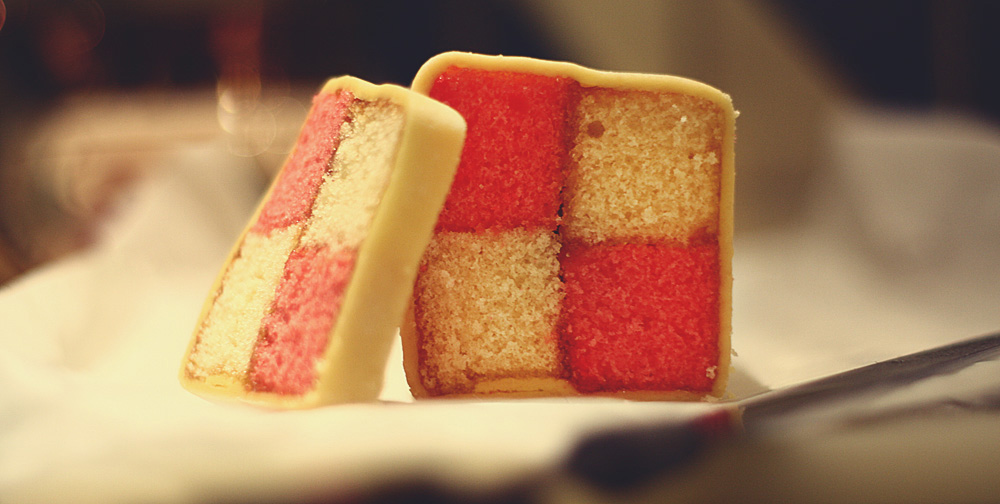
Battenberg cake is a light sponge cake

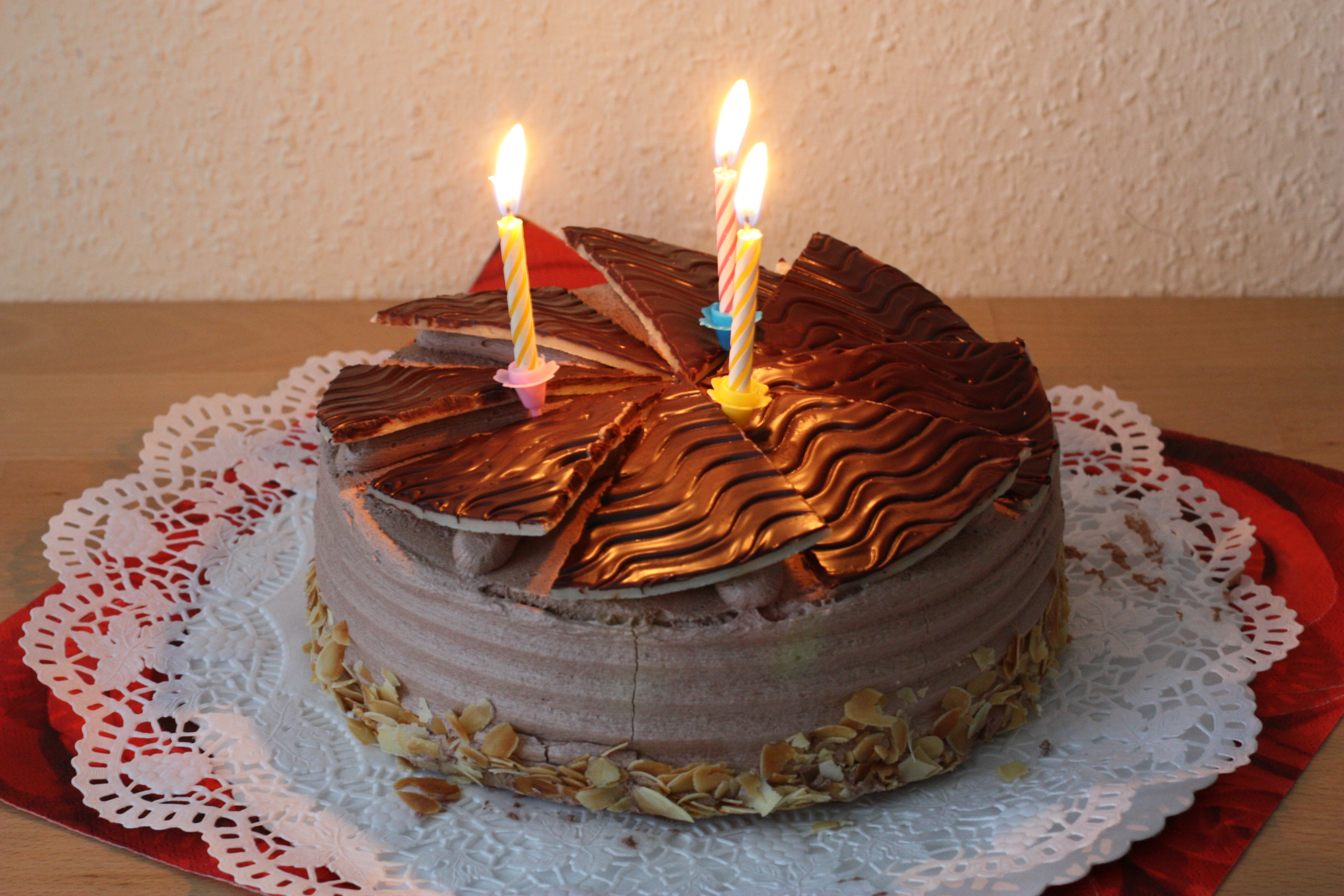
A birthday cake

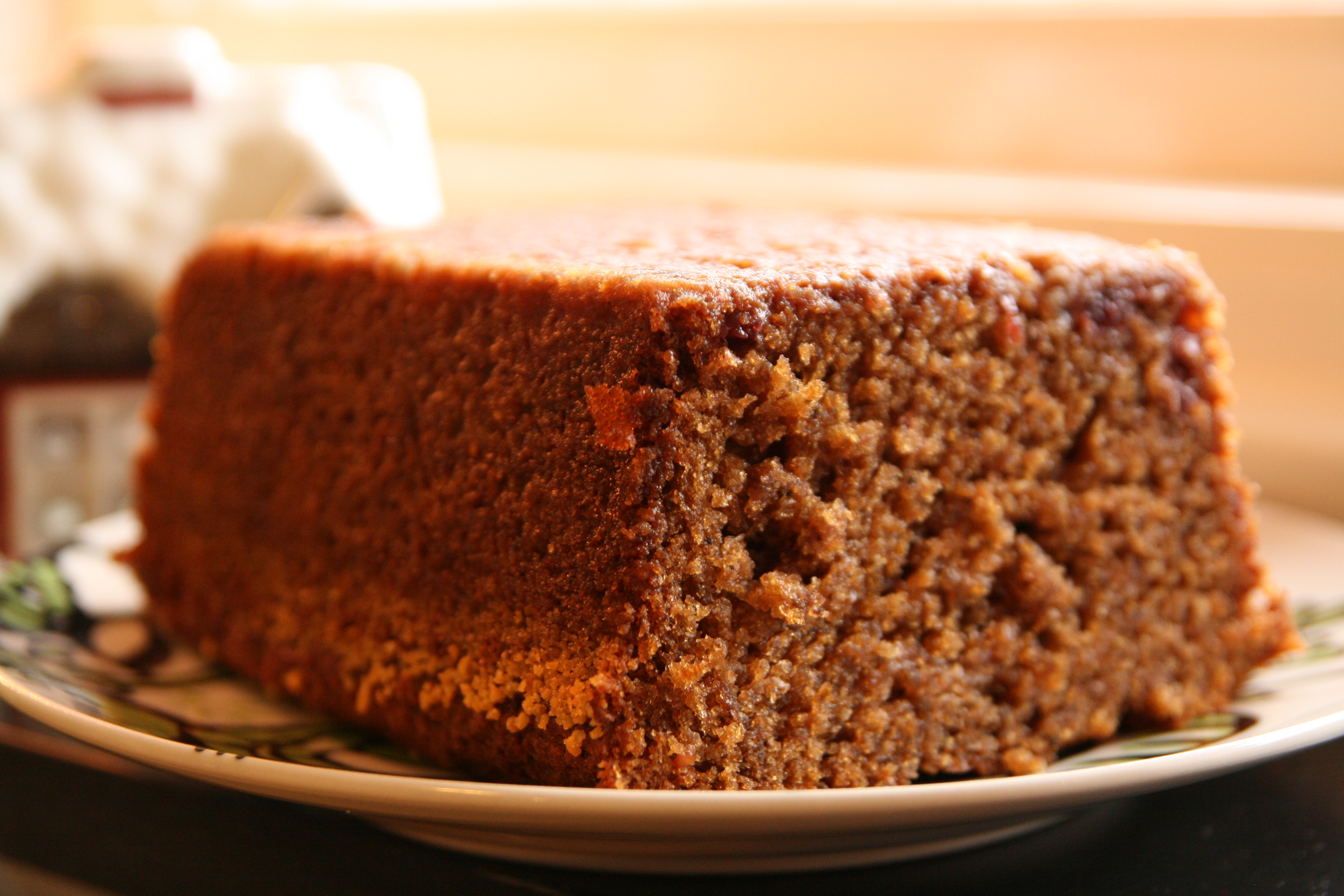
Gingerbread

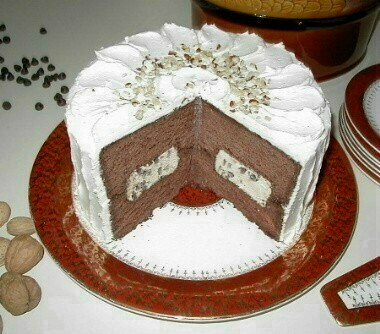
An ice cream cake

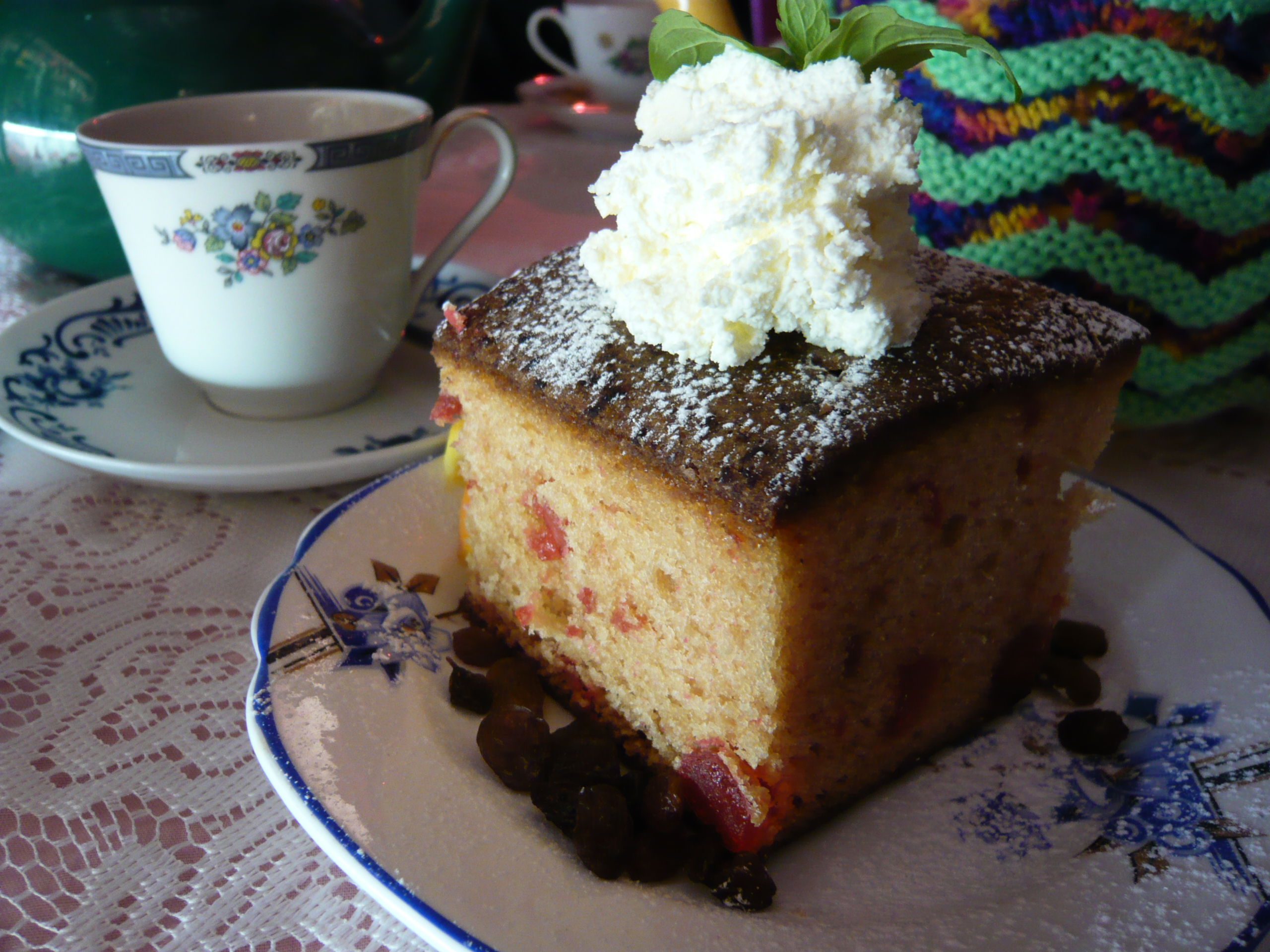
Madeira cakes tend to have a firm yet light texture, and are traditionally flavored with lemon

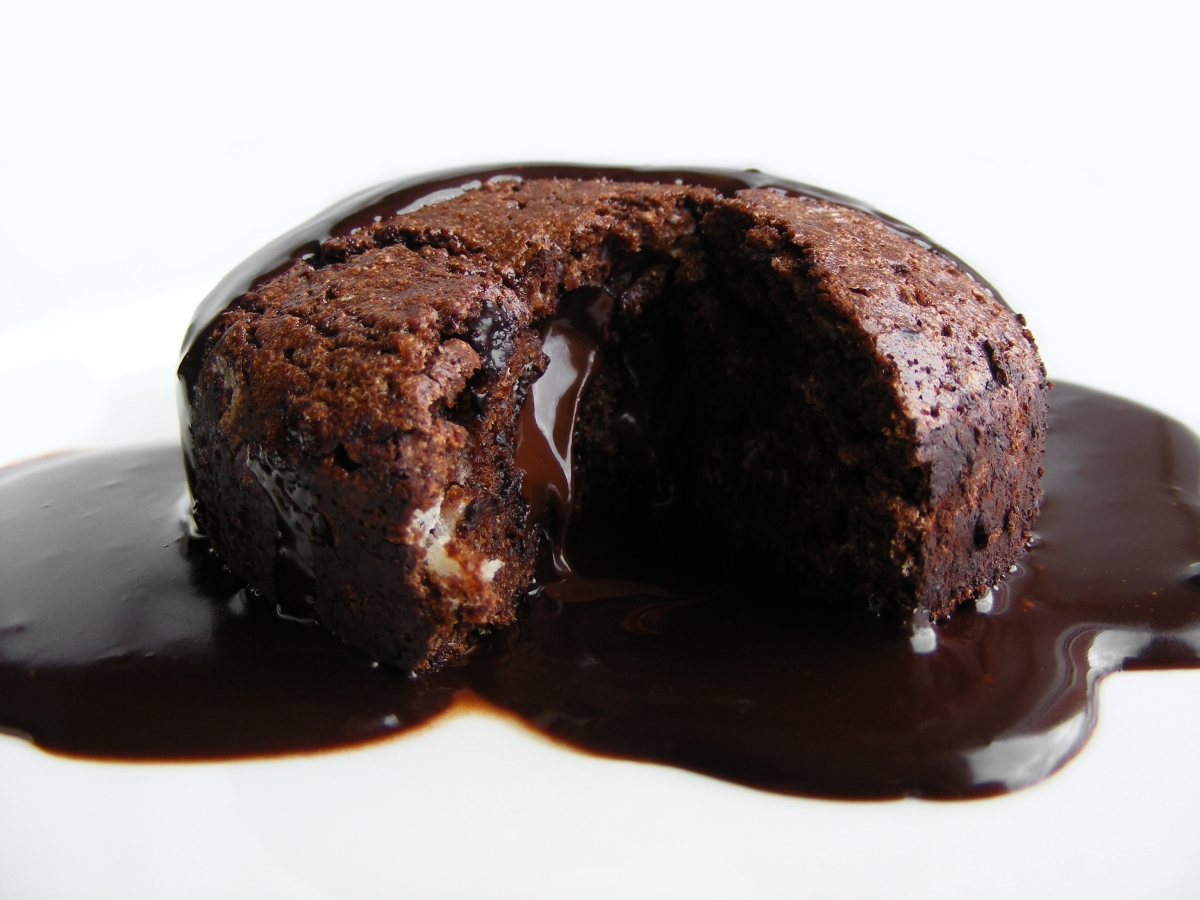
Molten chocolate cake

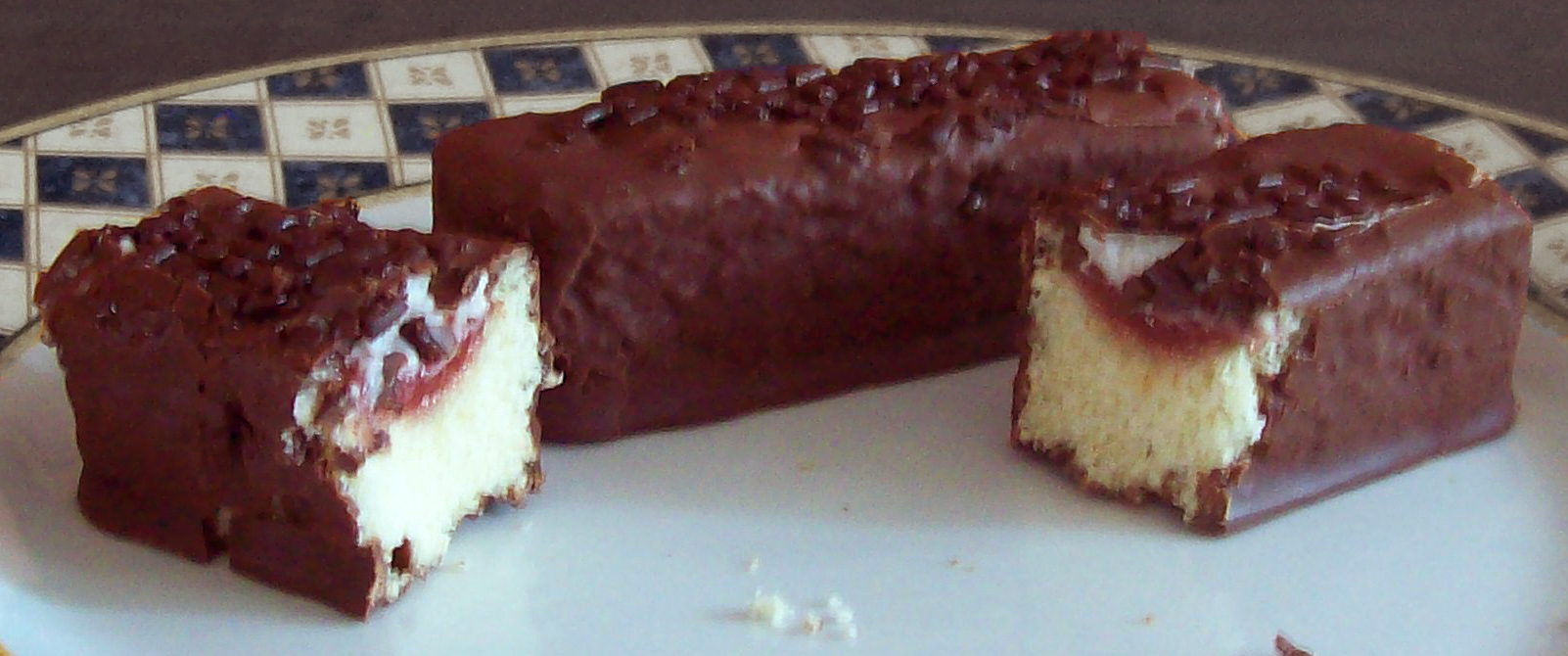
Gansito snack cakes, a baked dessert confectionery made with cake and icing

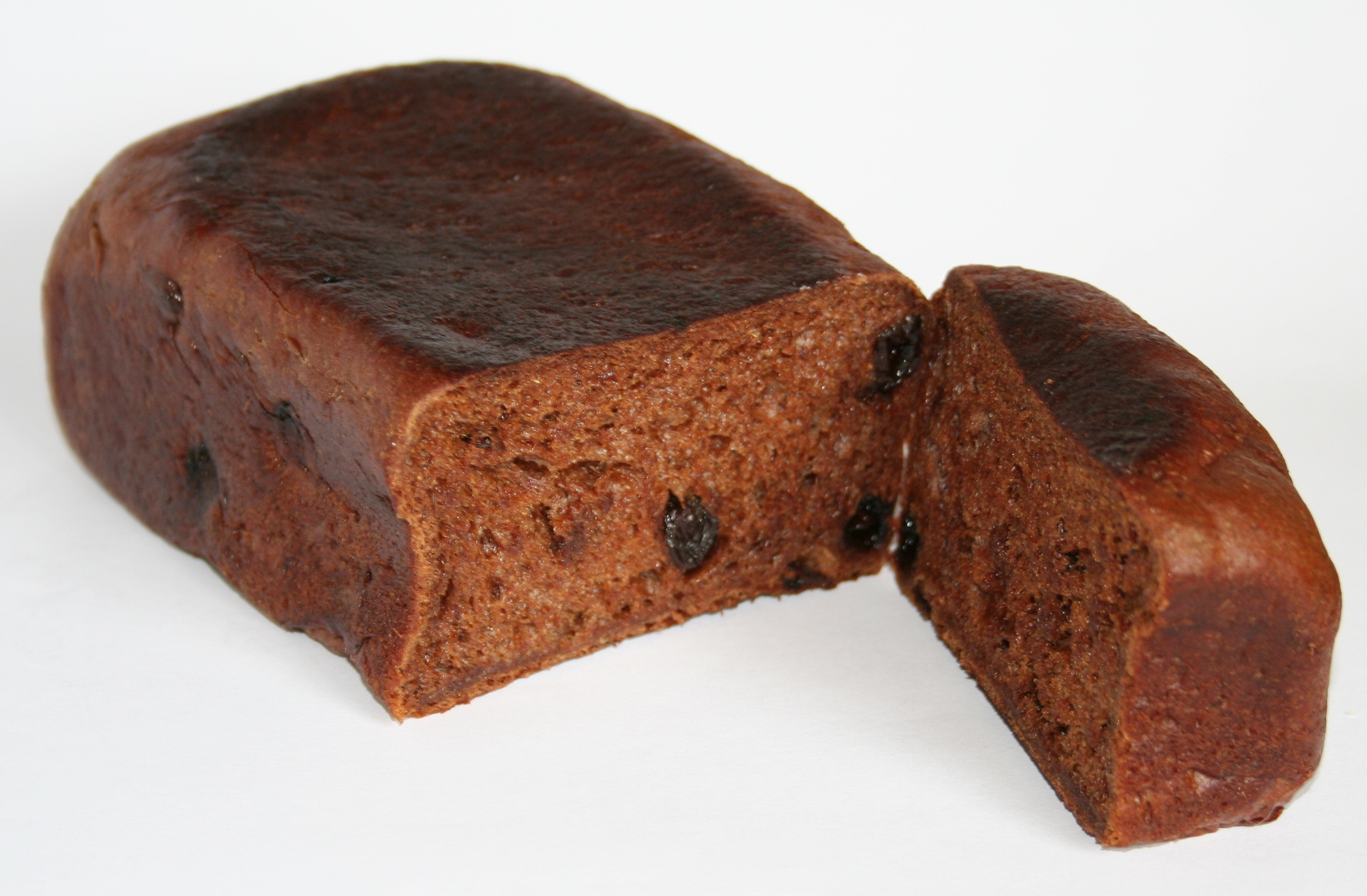
Malt loaves are a snack food from the United Kingdom

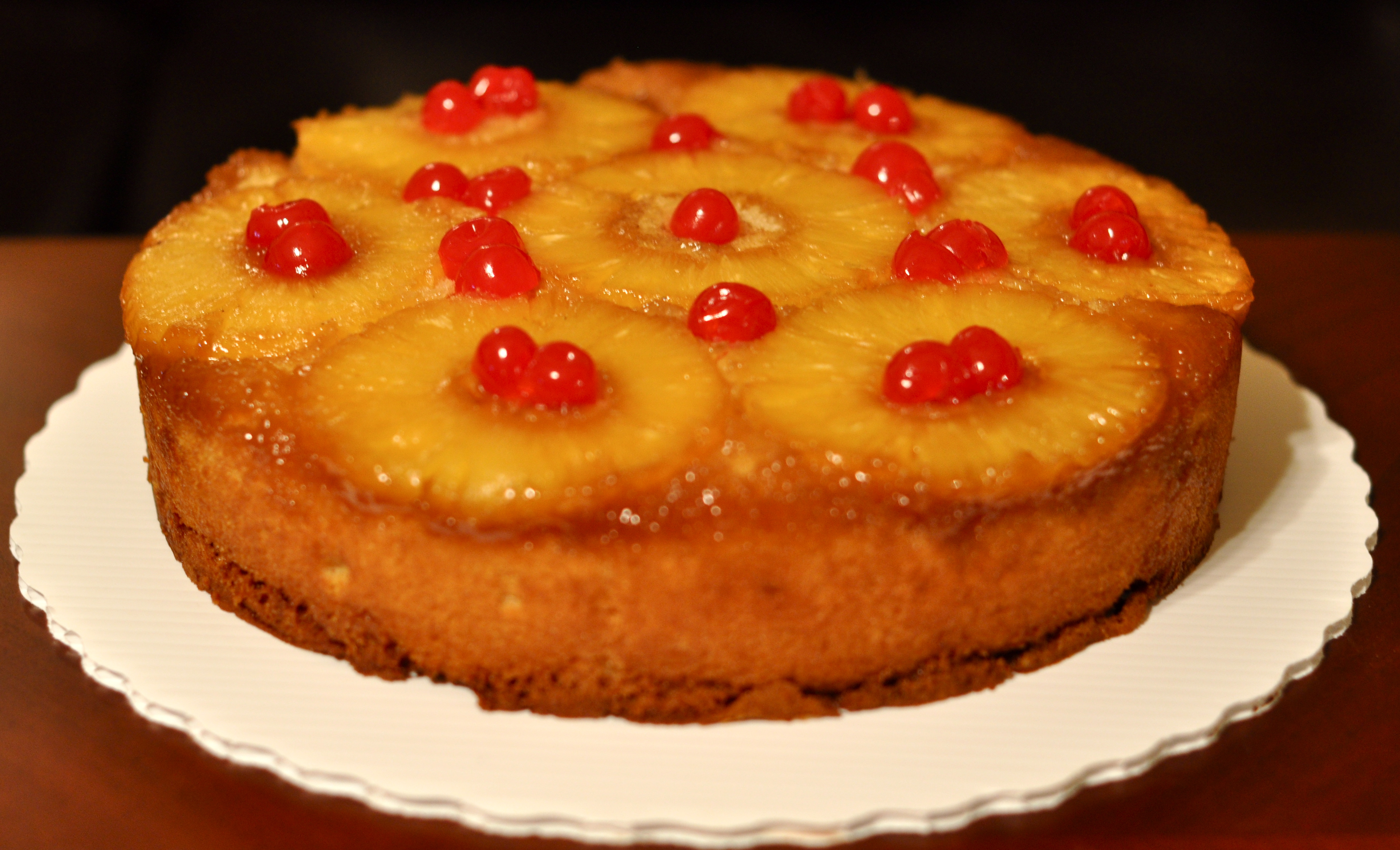
A pineapple upside-down cake

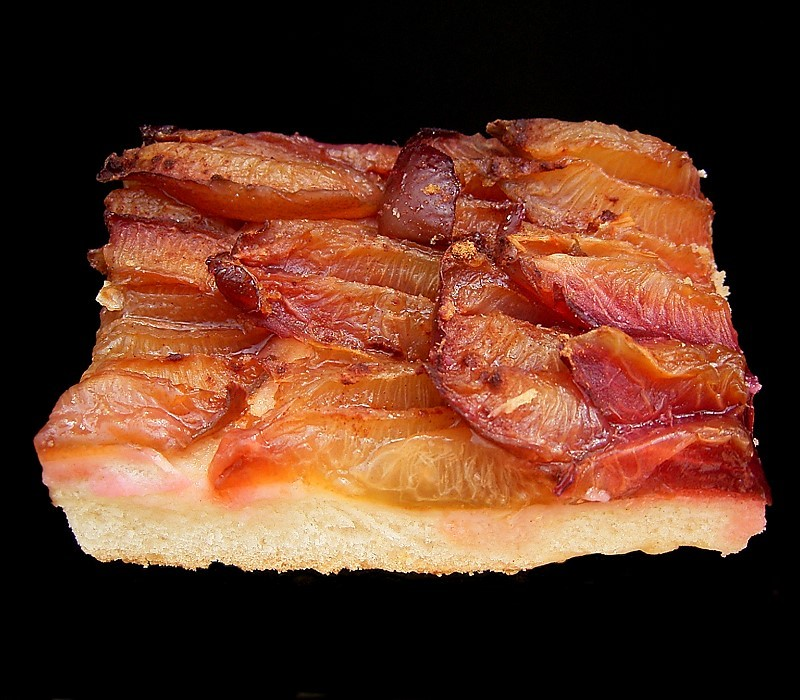
Zwetschgenkuchen is a sheet cake or pie made from yeast dough or shortcrust dough that is thinly spread onto a baking sheet and covered with pitted plums

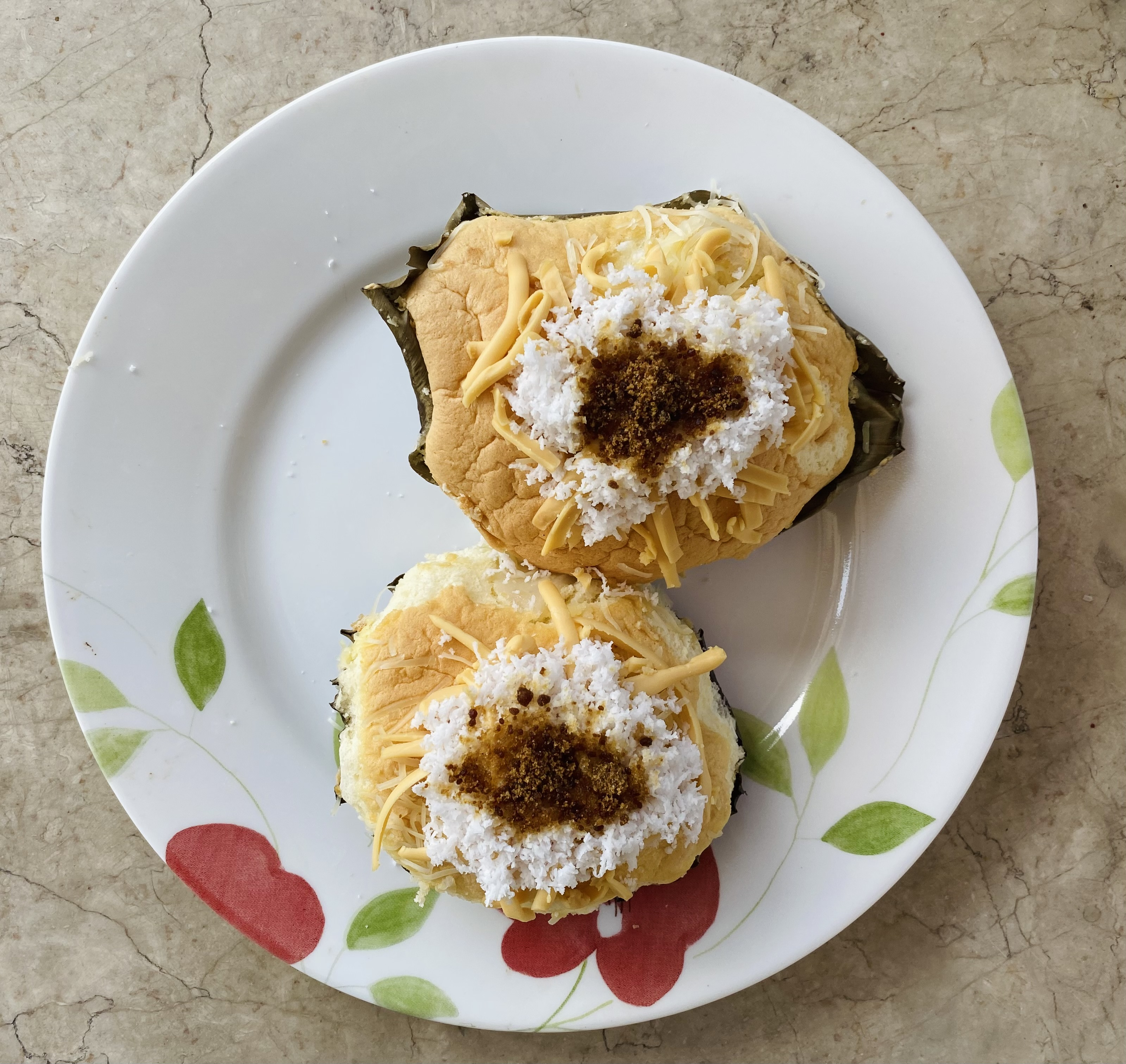
Bibingka, a Filipino rice cake with various toppings

=== Confectionery and candies ===
Confectionery is related to the food items that are rich in sugar and often referred to as a confection. Candy is a confection made from a concentrated solution of sugar in water, to which flavorings and colorants may be added. Candies come in numerous colors and varieties and have a long history in popular culture.

- Candy (category)

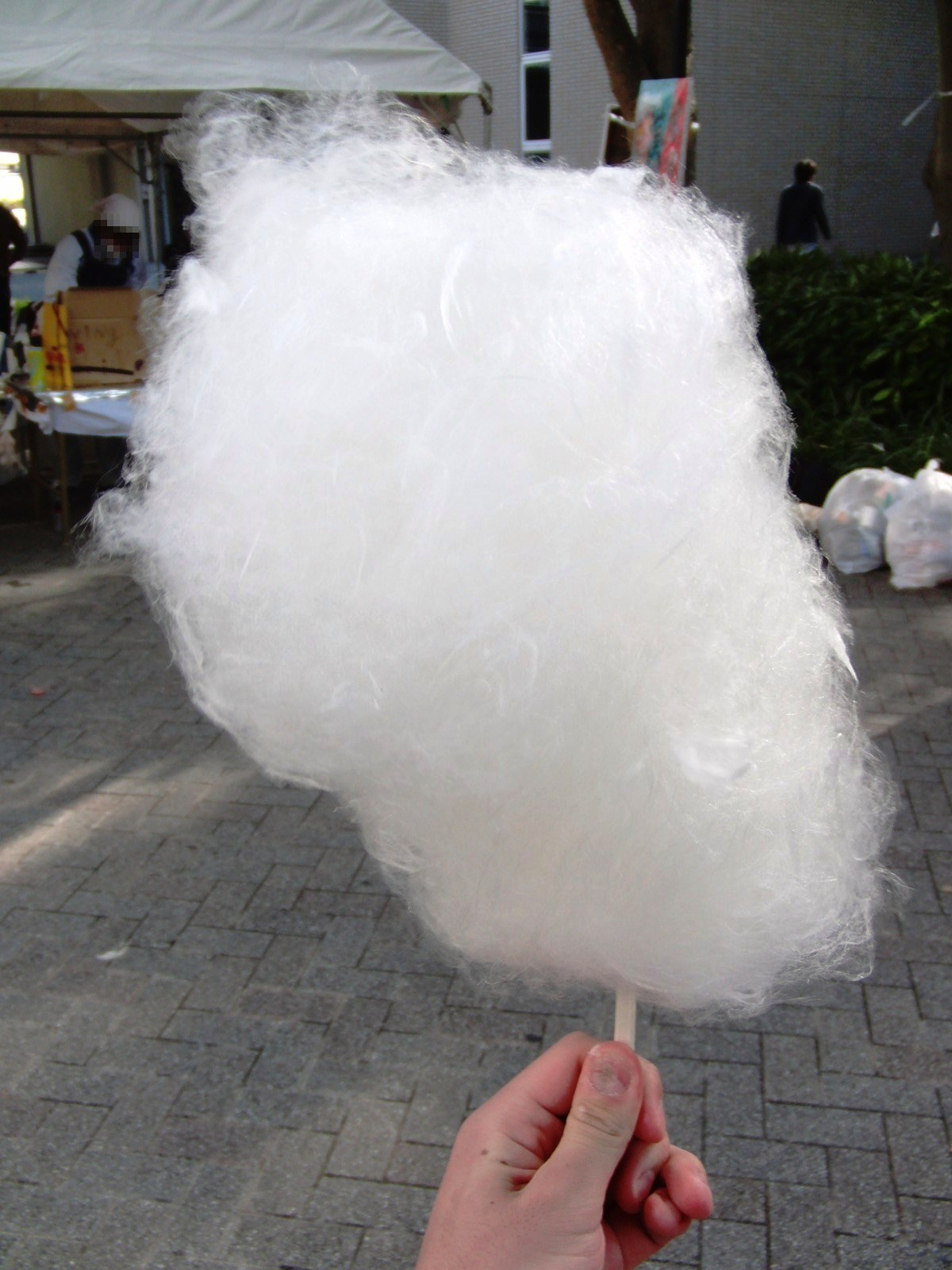
Cotton candy.

==== Confectionery ====
A

- Abnabat
- Akanés

B

- Besan barfi
- Bonbon
- Bourbon ball
- Brittle
- Bubble gum
- Buckeye candy
- Bulk confectionery
- Butterscotch

C

- Cajeta
- Calisson
- Candied fruit
- Candy
- Candy apple
- Candy cane
- Candy cigarette
- Candy corn
- Candy pumpkin
- Caramel
- Caramel apple
- Caramel corn
- Catànies
- Cezerye
- Chewing gum
- Chikki
- Choco pie
- Chocolate
- Chocolate balls
- Chocolate bar
- Chocolate-coated peanut
- Chocolate-covered coffee bean
- Chocolate-covered raisin
- Chocolate truffle
- Churchkhela
- Cocadas
- Coconut candy
- Comfit
- Cordial
- Cotton candy
- Cuberdon

D

- Dalgona
- Divinity
- Dodol
- Dominostein
- Dragée
- Dulce de leche

E

- Edible ink printing

F

- Fālūdhaj
- Fondant
- Fruit sours
- Fudge

G

- Gajak
- Gaz
- Geplak
- Gibraltar rock
- Glaze
- Gobstopper
- Gozinaki
- Gulab jamun

H

- Halva
- Hanukkah gelt
- Hard candy
- Haw flakes

I

- Imarti
- Ischoklad

J

- Jelly bean
- Jordan almonds

K

- Ka'í Ladrillo
- Kaju katli
- Kakinada khaja
- Kamarcut
- Karah Parshad
- Kesaria Peda
- Kettle corn
- Konfyt
- Konpeitō
- Kosereva

L

- Lacabòn
- Laddu
- Lakhamari
- Lemon drop
- Liquorice
- Liquorice allsorts

M

- Mampostial
- Manjar
- Maple sugar
- Maple taffy
- Marron glacé
- Marshmallow
- Marshmallow creme
- Marzipan
- Mendiant
- Milk chocolate
- Mint
- Misri
- Modjeska
- Mooncake
- Moustalevria
- Mozartkugel

N

- Noghl
- Nonpareils
- Nougat

O

- Oblaat
- Okchun-dang
- Orange jelly candy

P

- Paçoca
- Pashmak
- Pastila
- Pastille
- Peanut butter cup
- Pecan log roll
- Penuche
- Pepero
- Persipan
- Pirate coins
- Pirulín
- Pocky
- Polkagris
- Pontefract cake
- Poolaki
- Ptasie mleczko

Q

- Queijadinha

R

- Ribbon candy
- Rock
- Rock candy
- Rocky road
- Royal icing
- Rum ball
- Russian candy

S

- Salt water taffy
- Salty liquorice
- Sandesh
- Sesame seed candy
- Sherbet (powder)
- Singori
- S'more
- Sohan
- Soor ploom
- Sprinkles
- Spunk
- Stick candy
- Strela candy
- Succade
- Sugar cake
- Sugar mice
- Sugar paste
- Sugar plum
- Suikerboon
- Sukhdi
- Szaloncukor

T

- Tableting
- Tarasari
- Teja
- Throat lozenge
- Tiffin
- Tooth-friendly
- Turkish delight
- Turrón

Z

- Zefir
Confectionery

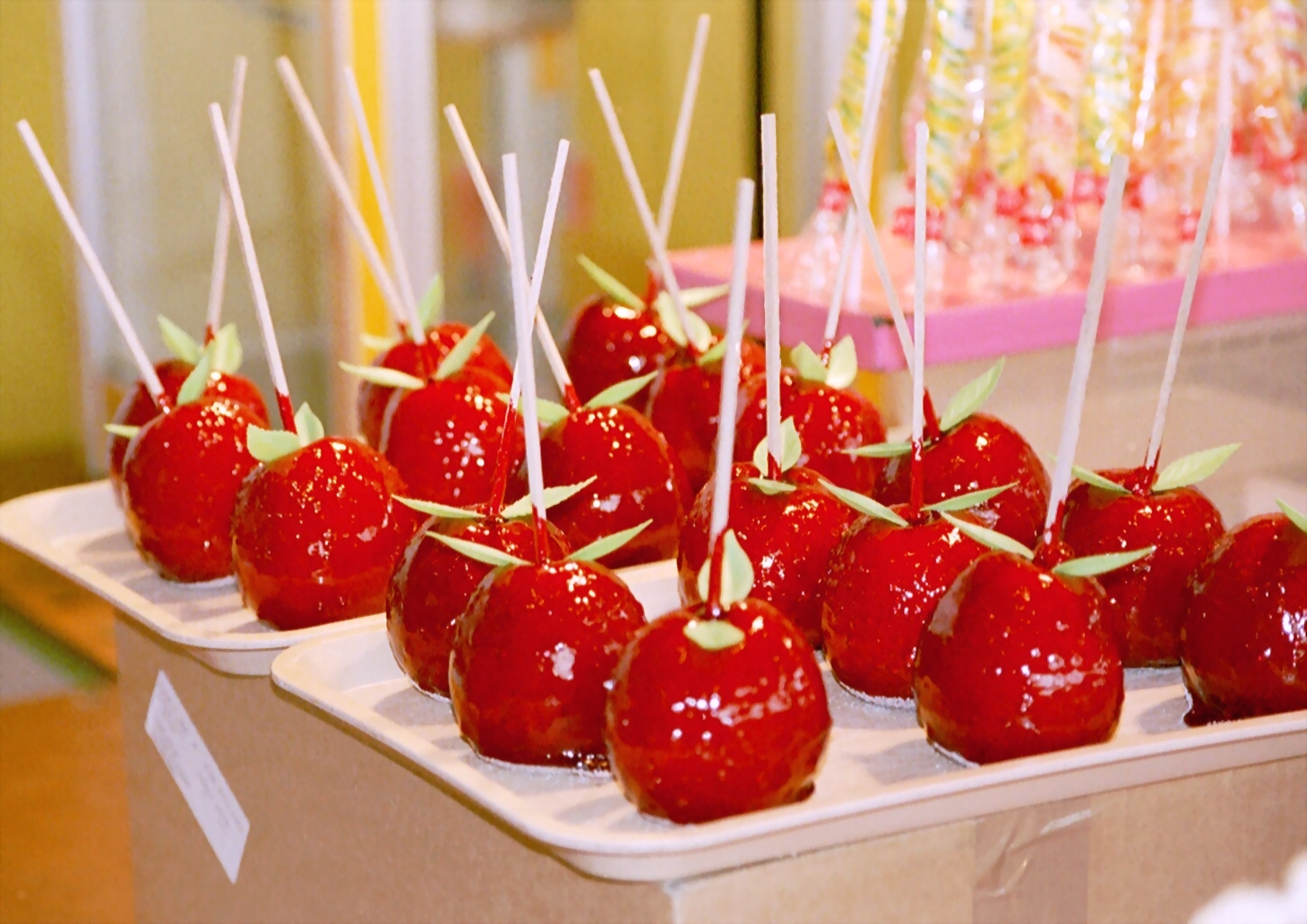
Candy apples

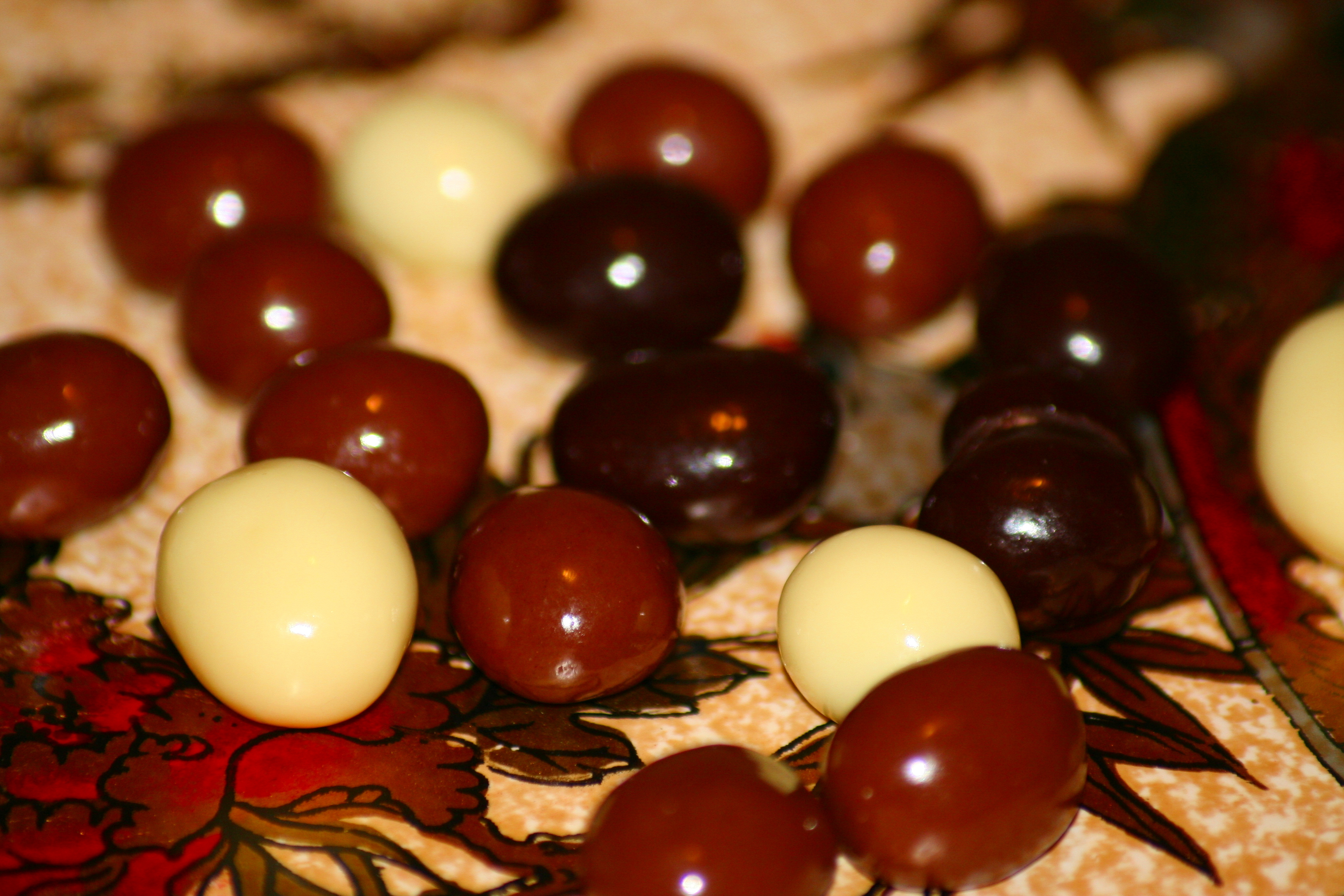
Chocolate-covered coffee beans

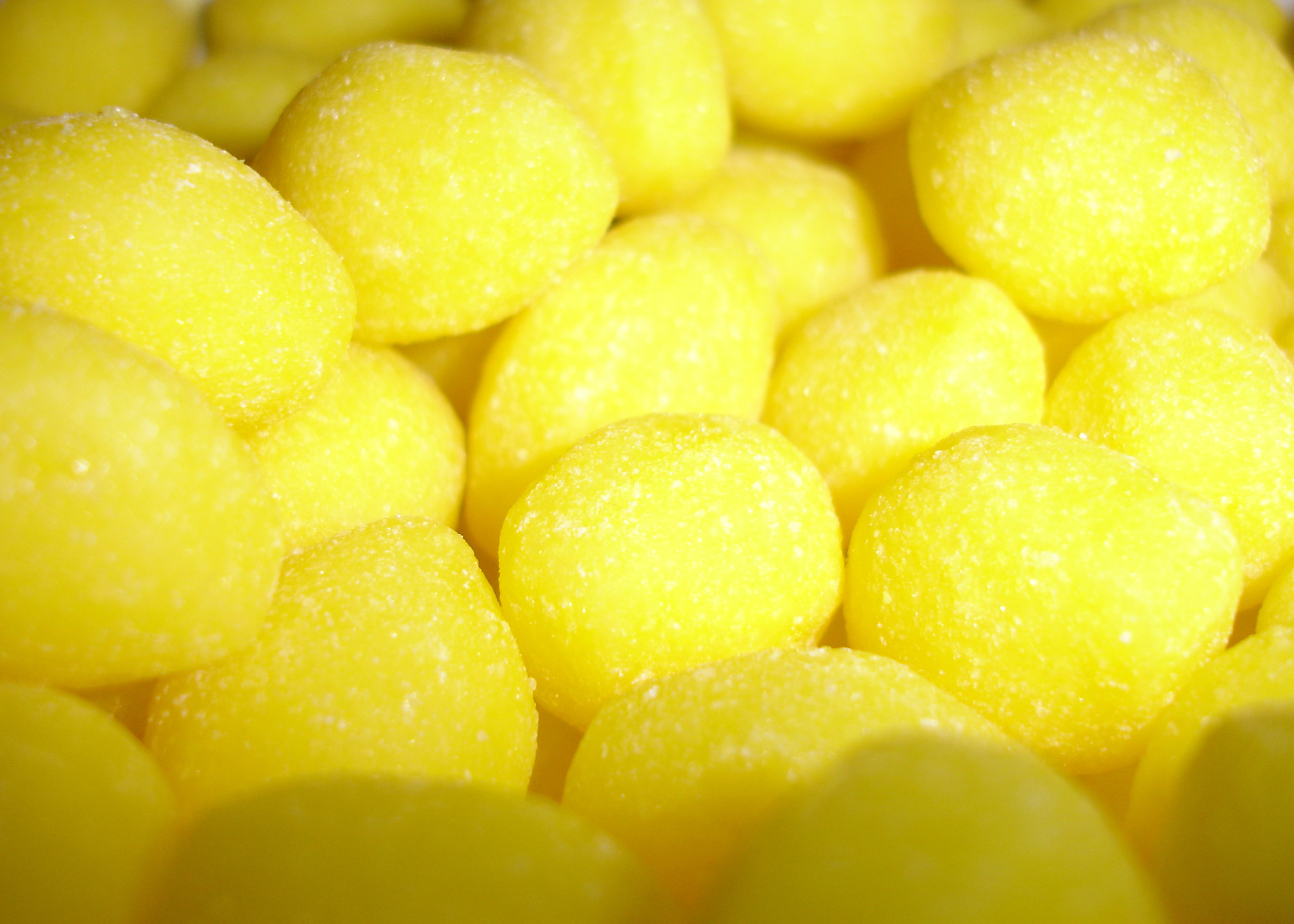
Lemon drops

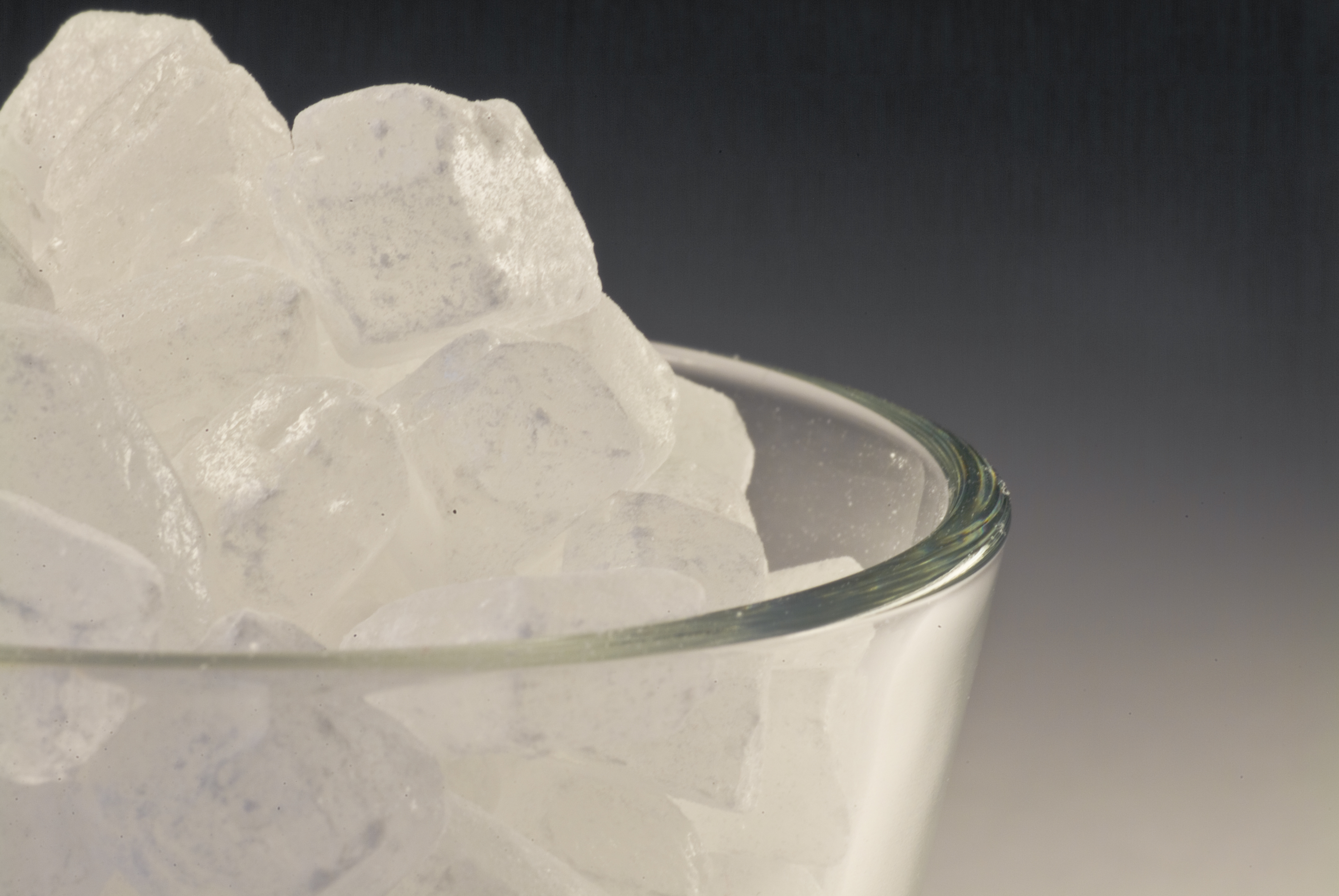
Rock candy

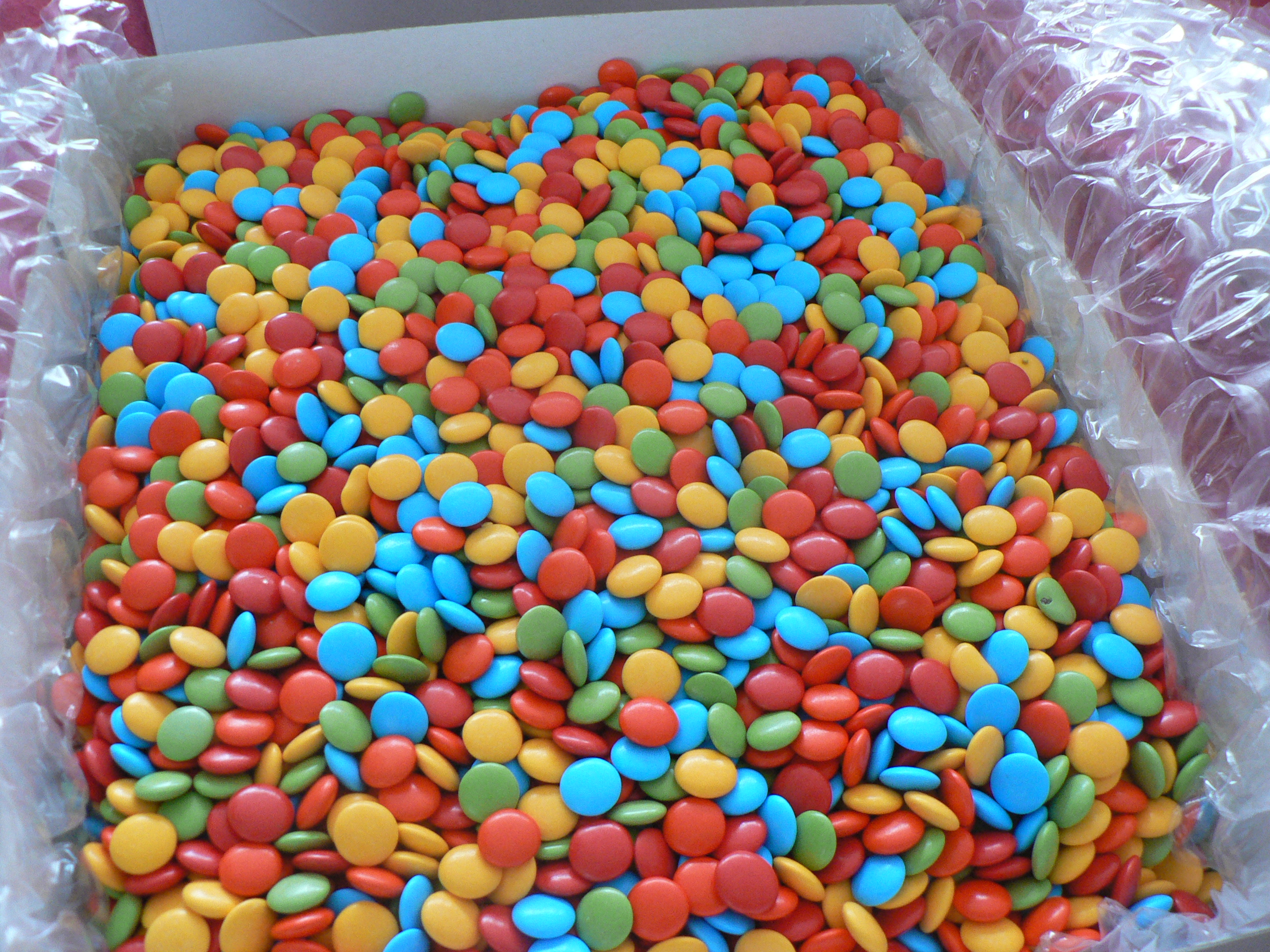
Suikerboon

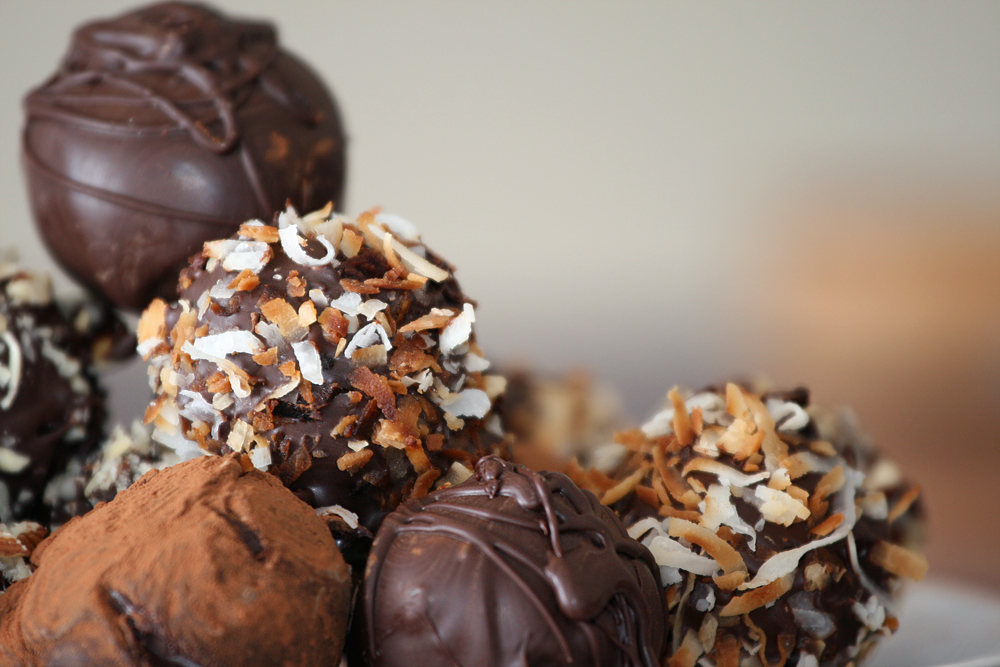
Chocolate truffles

=== Cookies ===
A cookie is a small, flat, baked treat, usually containing flour, eggs, sugar, and either butter or cooking oil, and often including ingredients such as raisins, oats, or chocolate chips.

A

- Ammonia cookie

B

- Bizcochito
- Black and white cookie
- Butter cookie
- Butter pecan

C

- Canestrelli
- Caycay
- Chocolate chip cookie
- Christmas cookies
- Colaz
- Cookie dough
- Cookie salad
- Corn cookie
- Coyotas

F

- Fattigmann
- Finikia
- Fortune cookie

G

- Gingerbread cookie
- Ginger nut
- Guyuria

H

- Hallongrotta

J

- Jodenkoek
- Jumble

K

- Kichel
- Kleicha
- Koloocheh and Masgati
- Krumkake
- Kuih semperit

M

- Macaron
- Macaroon
- Maple leaf cream cookies
- Moravian spice cookies
- Mustacciuoli

N

- Nanaimo bar
- Nocciolini di Canzo

O

- Oatmeal raisin cookie

P

- Panellets
- Peanut butter cookie
- Pignolo
- Pizzelle
- Polvorón

Q

- Qurabiya

R

- Rainbow cookie
- Reshteh khoshkar
- Rock cake
- Rose Cookies
- Rosette
- Roskette
- Russian tea cake

S

- Sandbakelse
- Silvana
- Snickerdoodle
- Sohan
- Stroopwafel
- Sugar cookie

T

- Teiglach
- Thin Mints
- Tuile
- Tuticorin macaroon

W

- Whoopie pie
Cookies

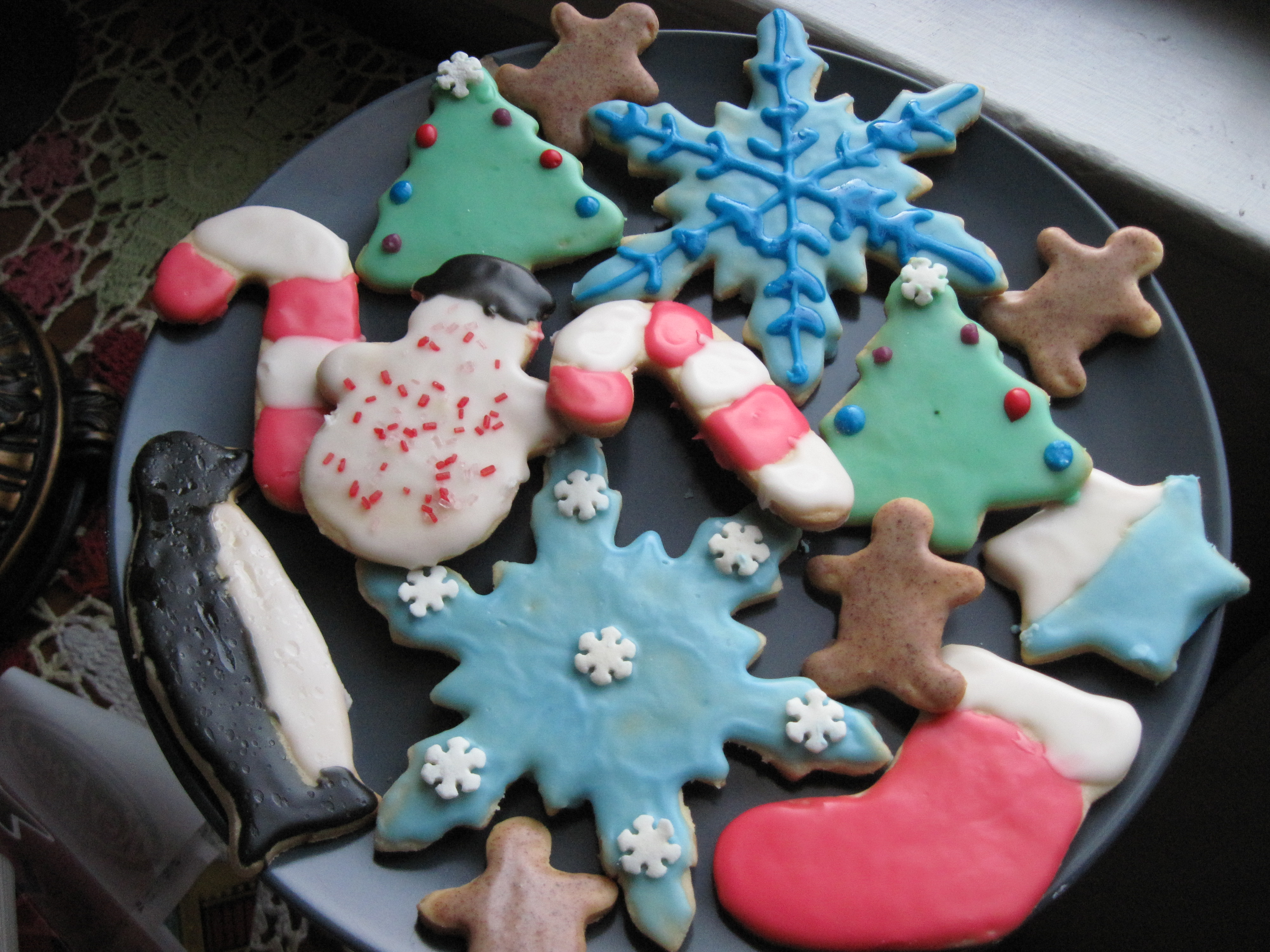
Christmas cookies

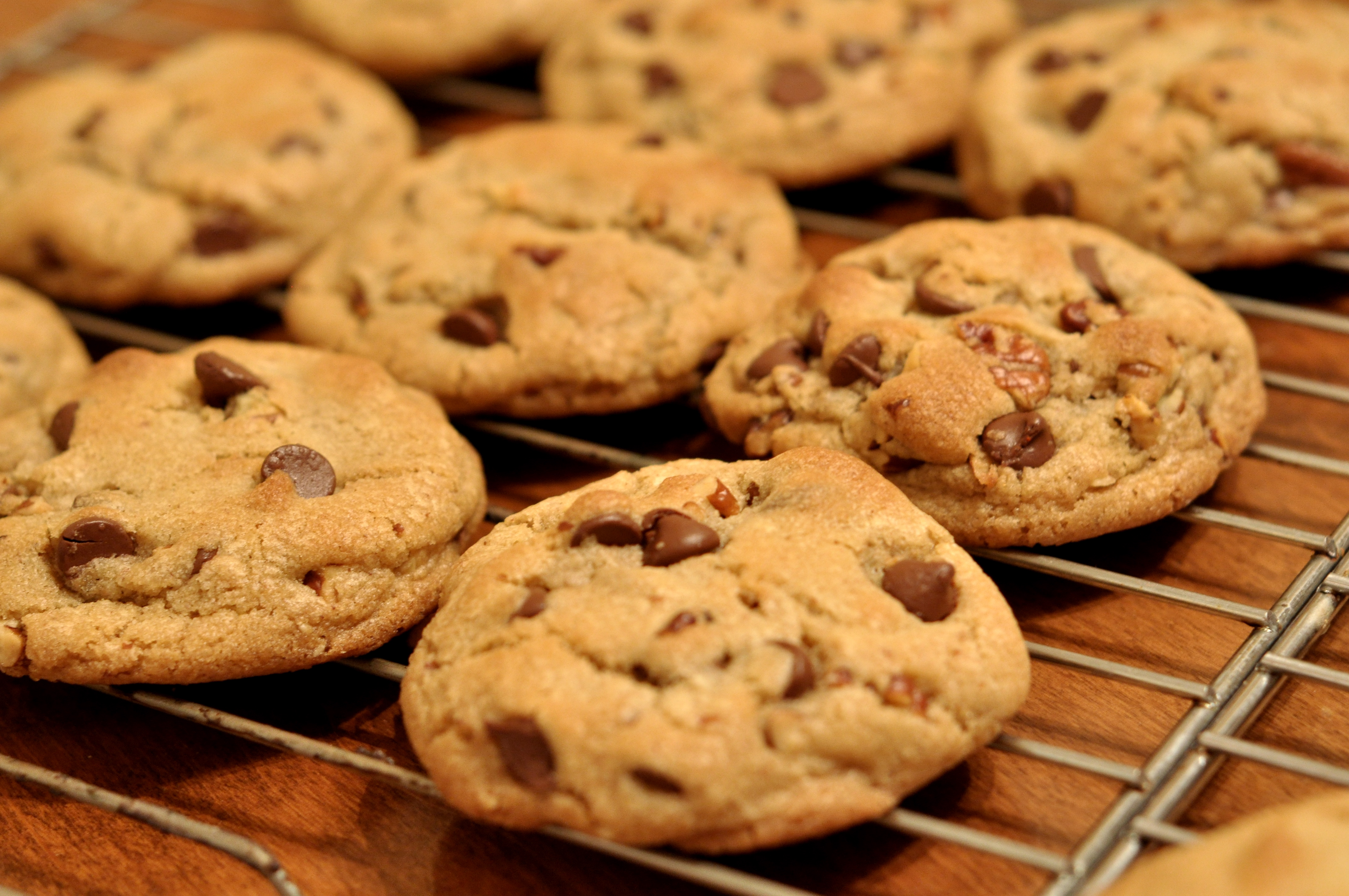
Chocolate chip cookies

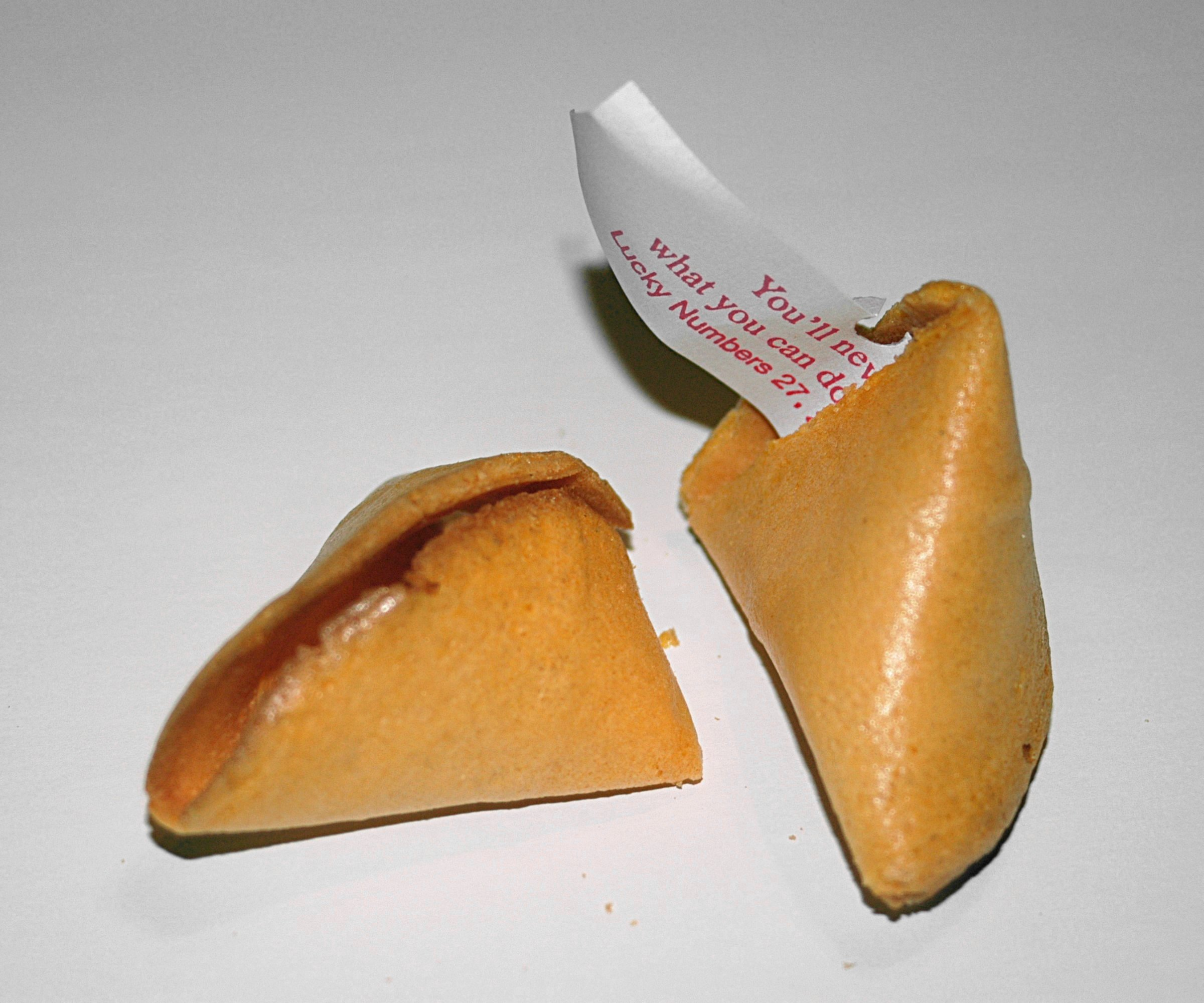
An opened fortune cookie

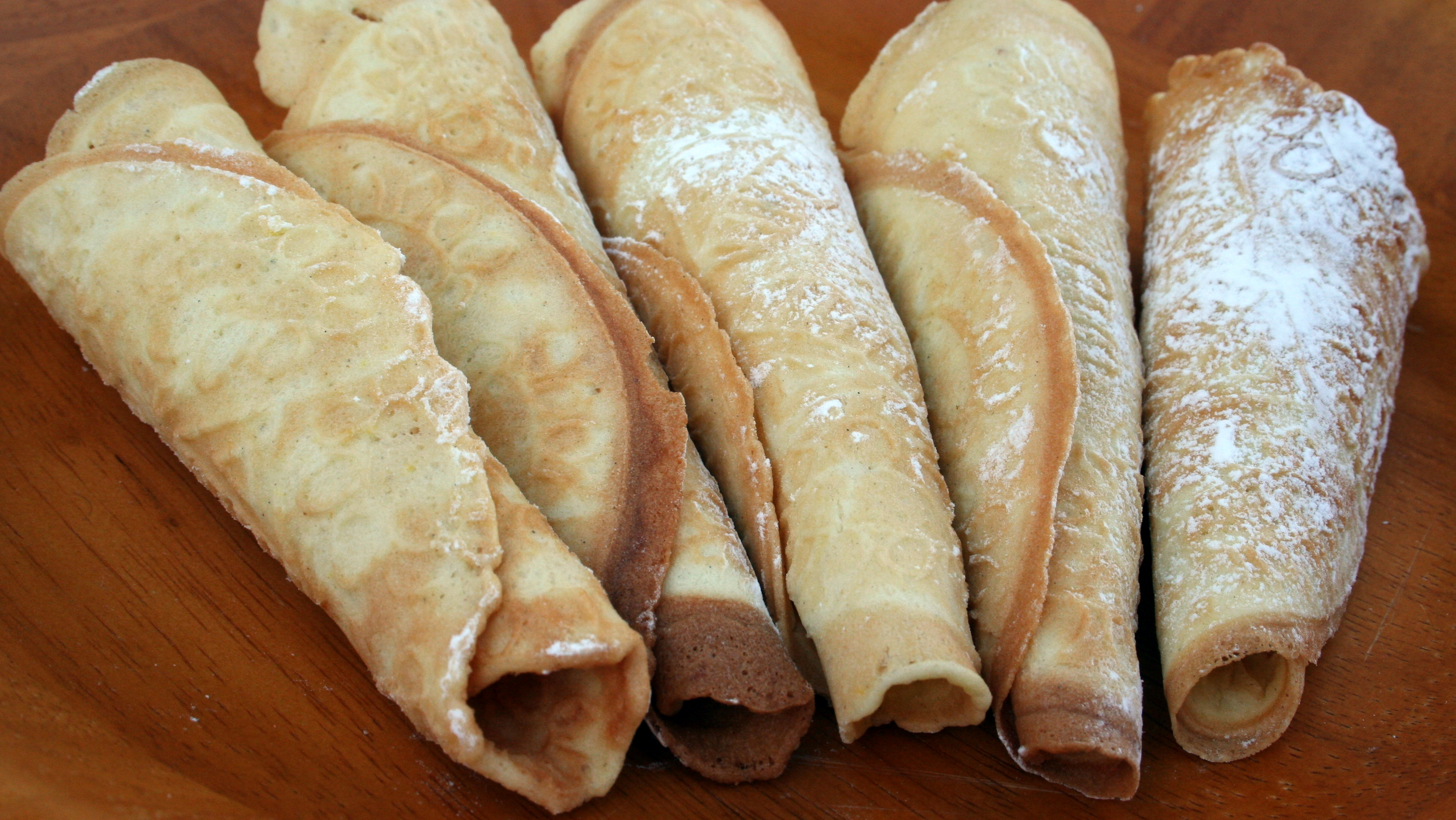
Krumkake, some dusted with powdered sugar

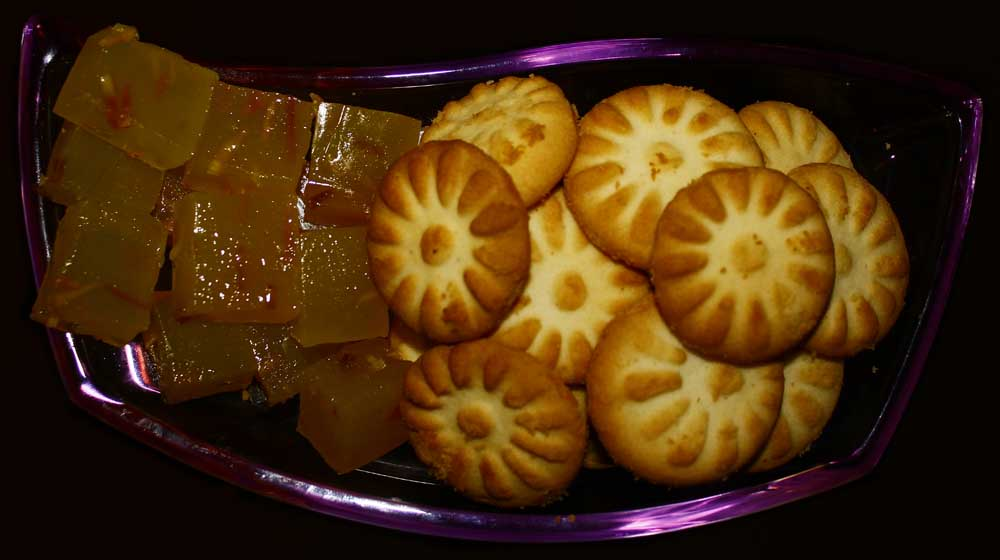
Masgati (left) and Koloocheh (right)

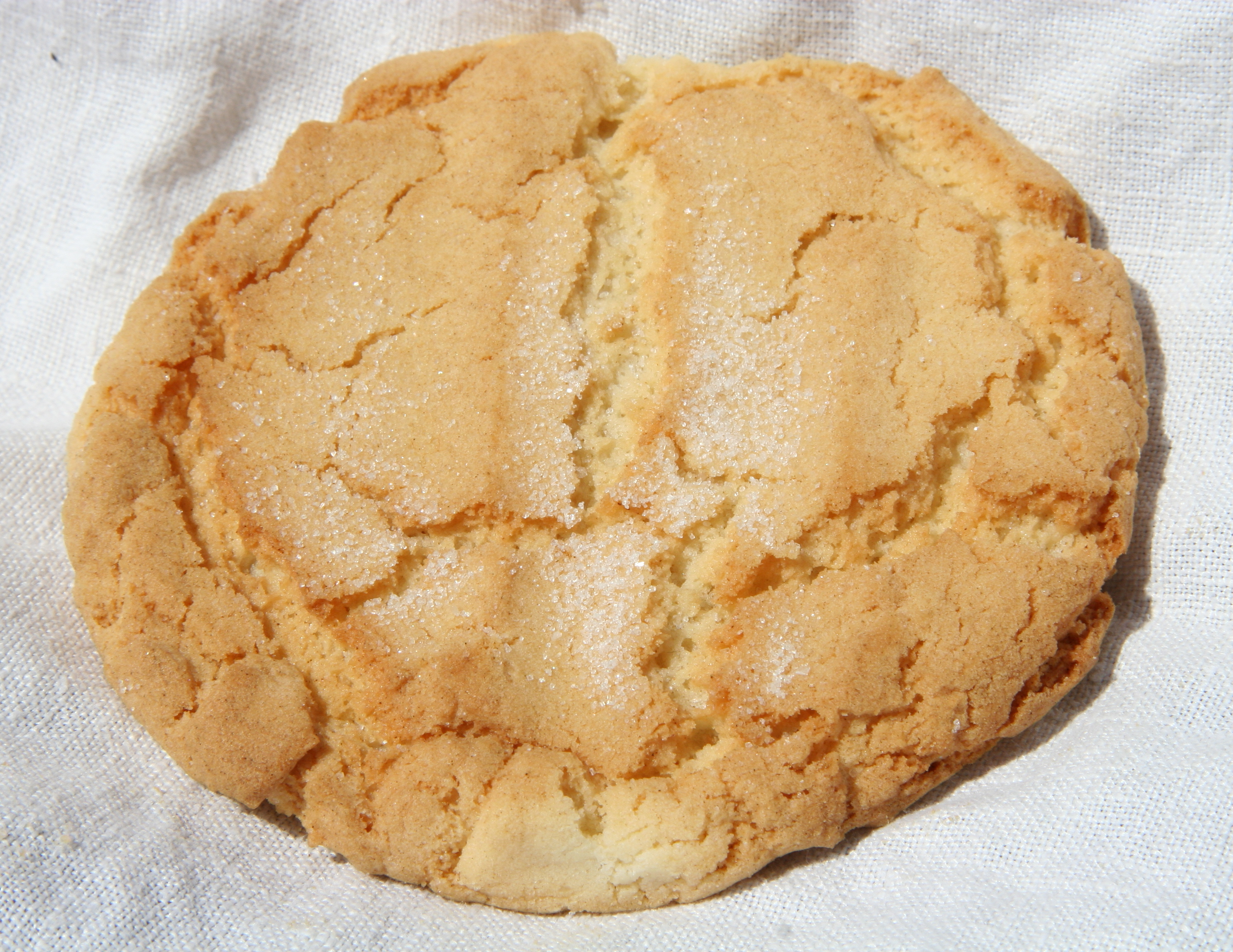
A plain sugar cookie

=== Custards ===
Custard is a variety of culinary preparations based on a cooked mixture of milk or cream and egg yolk. Depending on how much egg or thickener is used, custard may vary in consistency from a thin pouring sauce (crème anglaise) to a thick pastry cream (crème pâtissière) used to fill éclairs. Most common custards are used as desserts or dessert sauces and typically include sugar and vanilla. Custard bases may also be used for quiches and other savory foods. Sometimes flour, corn starch, or gelatin is added as in pastry cream or crème pâtissière.

B

- Banana pudding
- Bavarian cream
- Bean pie
- Berliner
- Bienenstich
- Boston cream doughnut
- Boston cream pie
- Bougatsa
- Bread and butter pudding
- Buttermilk pie

C

- Charlotte
- Cheesecake
- Chiboust cream
- Clafoutis
- Coconut custard
- Coconut jam
- Cream pie
- Crème anglaise
- Crème brûlée
- Crème caramel
- Custard pie
- Custard tart

E

- Éclair
- Egg tart

F

- Far Breton
- Flanby
- Flapper pie
- Floating island
- Flourless chocolate cake
- Frangipane
- French toast
- Frozen custard

G

- Galaktoboureko

K

- Kissel
- Kogel mogel
- Kremna rezina
- Kremówka
- Krempita
- Krofne

M

- Malvern pudding
- Manchester tart
- Mató de Pedralbes
- Melktert
- Miguelitos
- Mille-feuille

N

- Nanaimo bar
- Natillas
- Neenish tart
- Norman Tart

O

- Ozark pudding

P

- Pączki
- Pastel de nata
- Pio Quinto
- Pot de crème
- Profiterole
- Pudding
- Pumpkin pie

Q

- Queen of Puddings
- Quindim

R

- Rožata

S

- Salzburger Nockerl
- Skolebrød
- Soufflé
- Spotted dick
- St. Honoré cake
- Sweet potato pie

T

- Tarte à la Bouillie
- Tiramisu
- Torta de nata
- Treacle sponge pudding
- Trifle

V

- Vla

W

- Watalappam

Z

- Zabaione
- Zeppole
Custards

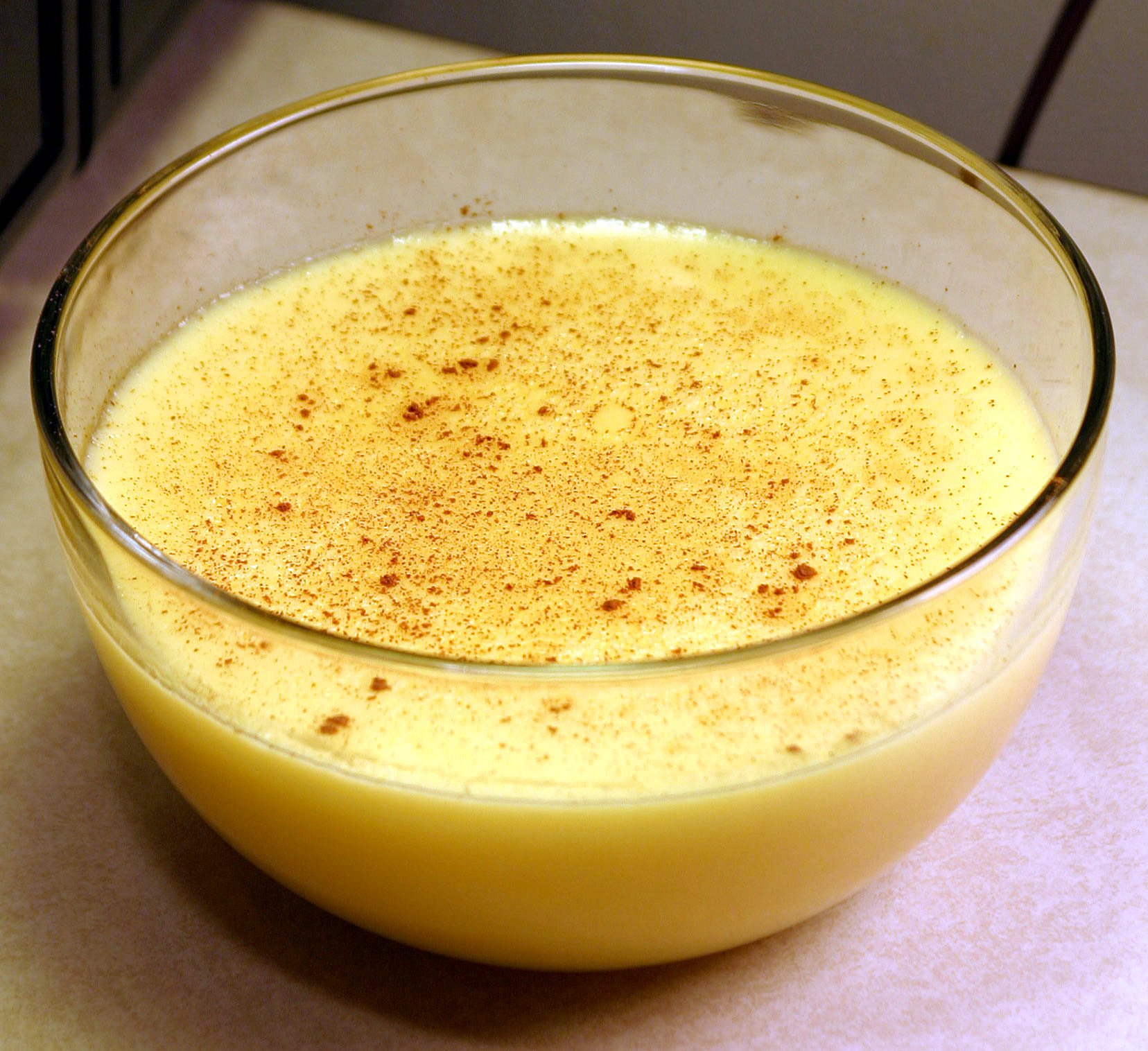
A bowl of crème anglaise custard, dusted with nutmeg

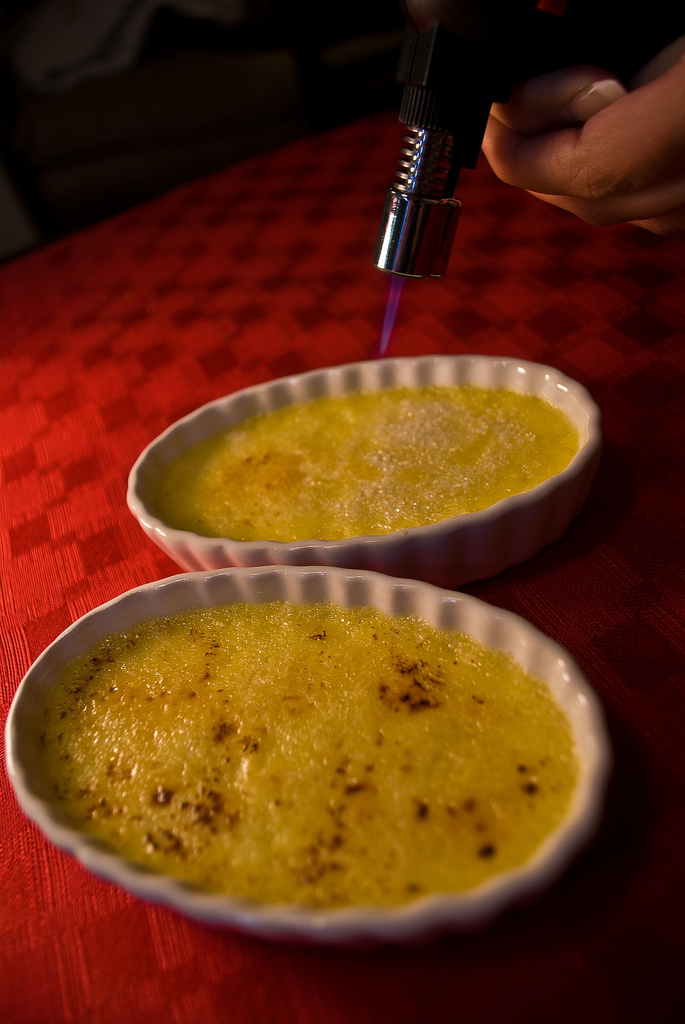
Crème brûlée prepared using a torch

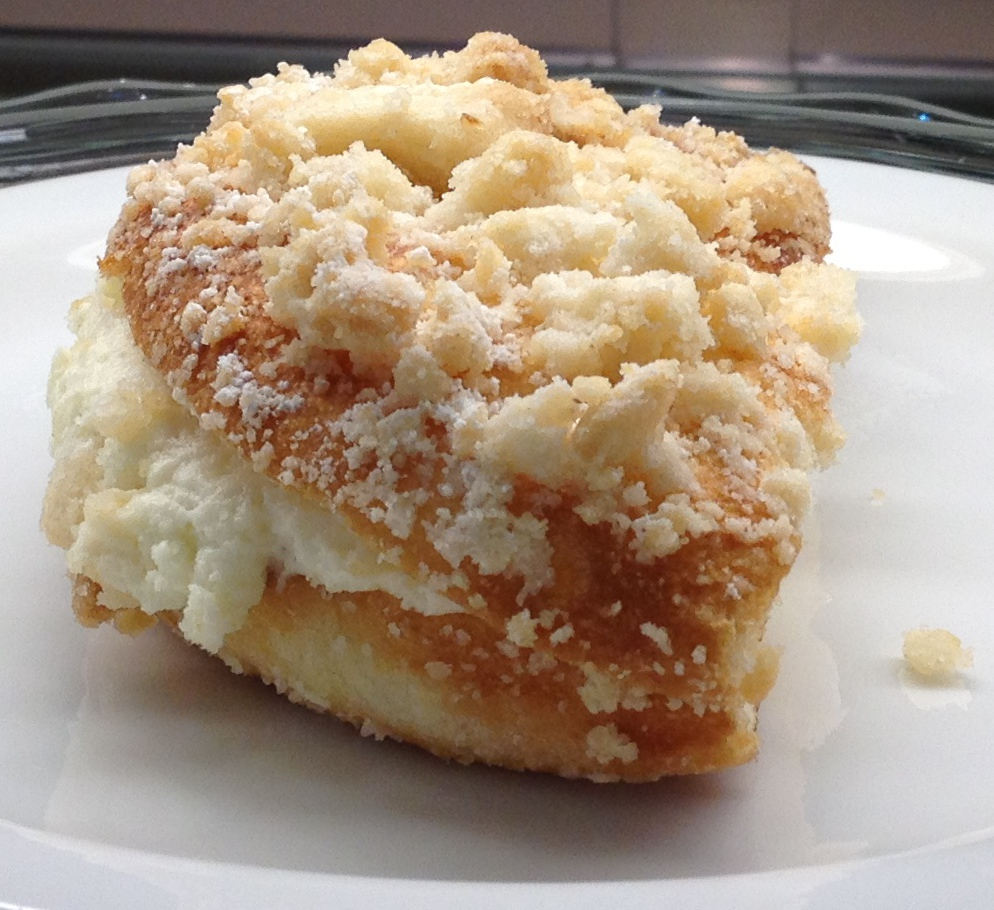
A Bavarian cream crumb pastry

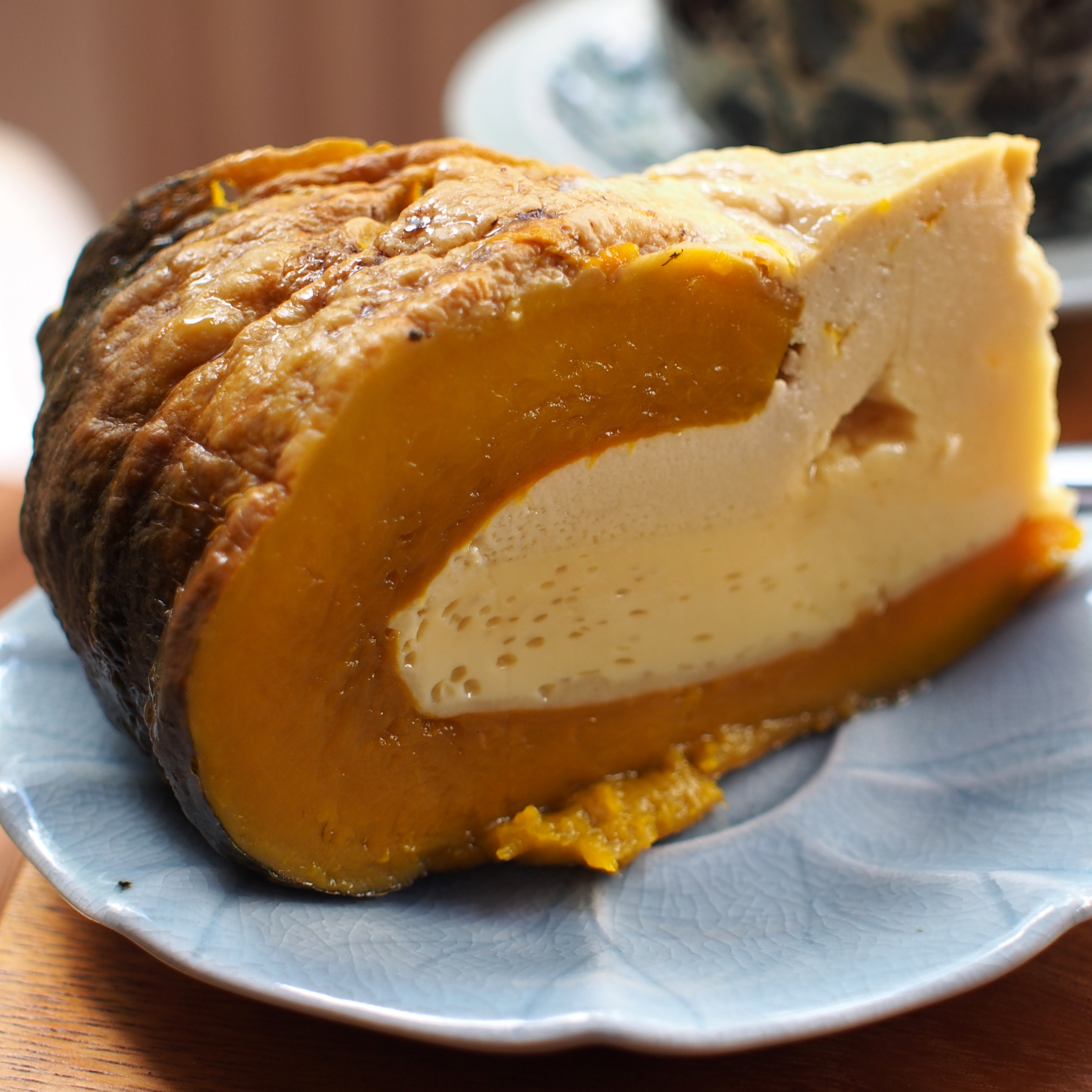
Coconut custard is a dessert dish consisting of a coconut custard steam-baked in a pumpkin or kabocha.

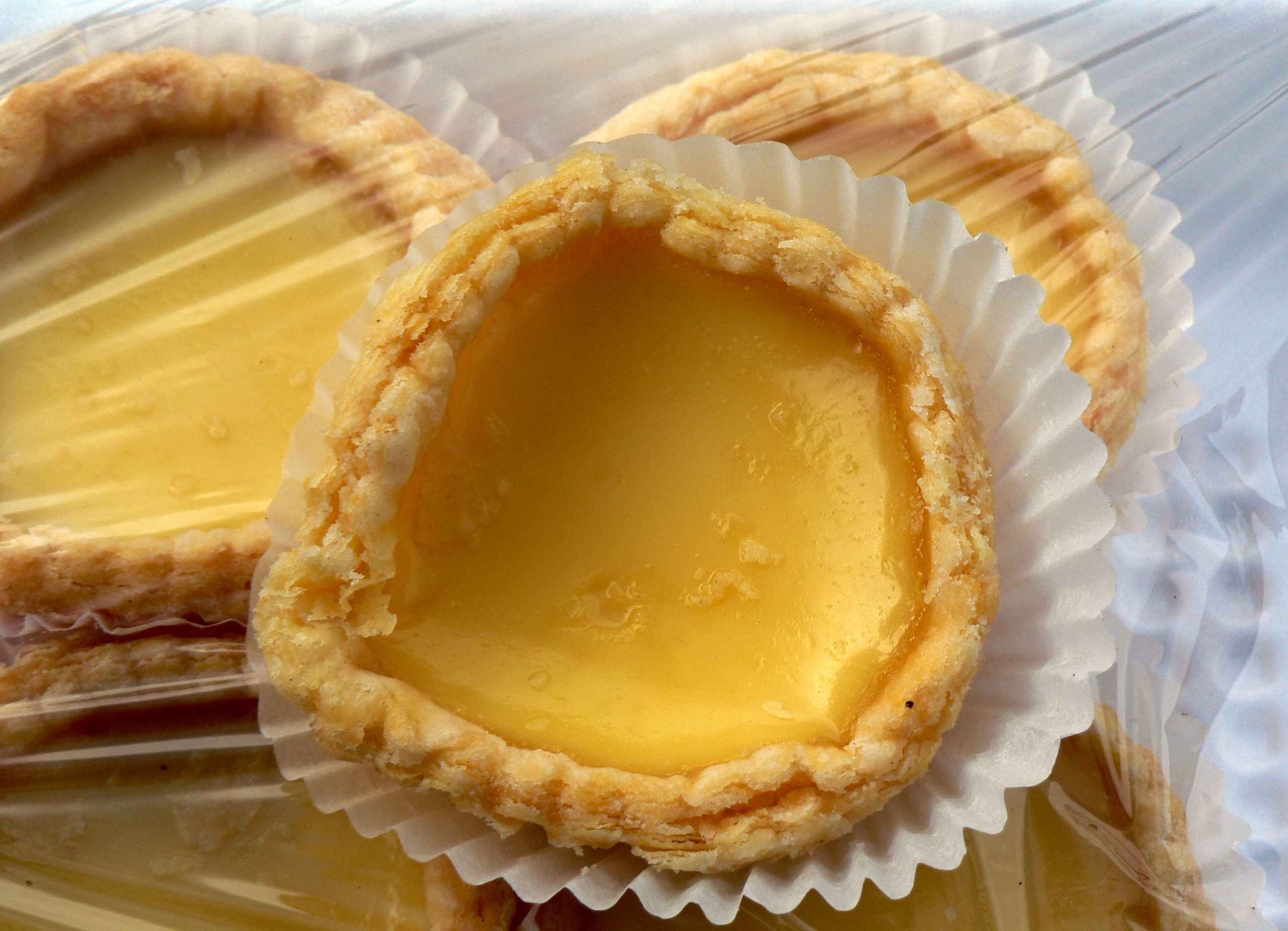
Egg custard tarts

=== Dessert sauces ===
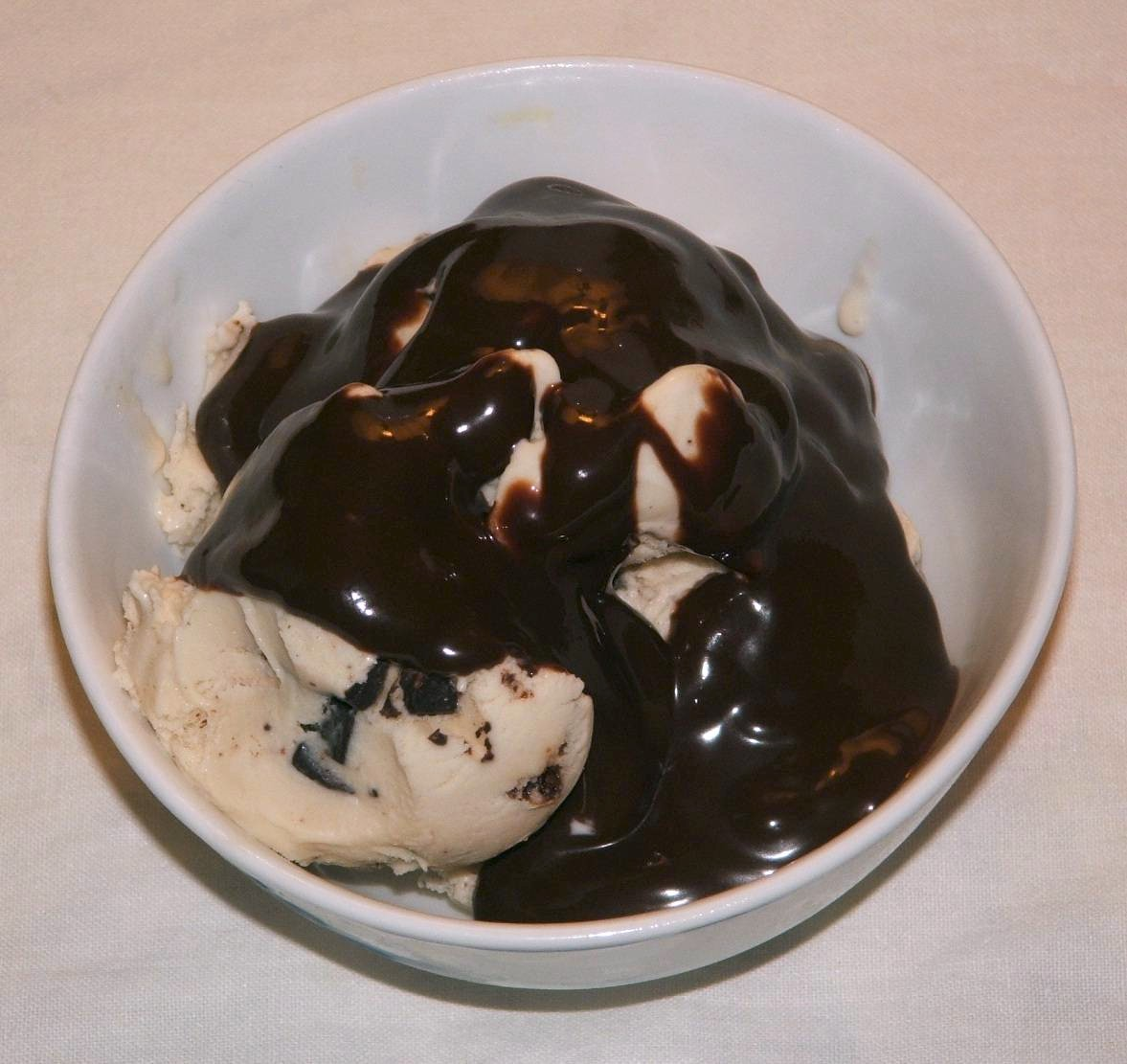
Chocolate syrup on top of ice cream

Dessert sauces are used to add flavor and texture to desserts, and tend to be sweet.

C

- Caramel sauce
- Chancaca
- Cherries jubilee
- Chocolate syrup
- Custard
  - Crème anglaise
  - Crème pâtissière

D

- Dream Whip

F

- Fruit curd

H

- Hard sauce

L

- Latik

M

- Magic Shell

R

- Rumtopf

S

- Slatko

W

- Wet walnuts

==== Italian cuisine ====
- Sauce – sweet sauces

=== Doughnuts ===
A doughnut, or donut, is a type of fried dough confectionery or dessert food. The doughnut is popular in many countries and prepared in various forms as a sweet snack that can be homemade or purchased in bakeries, supermarkets, food stalls, and franchised specialty outlets.

A

- Angel wings
- Awwamaat

B

- Bamiyeh
- Baursaki
- Bear claw
- Beignet
- Berliner
- Bombolone
- Boortsog
- Boston cream doughnut
- Brown Bobby
- Buñuelo

C

- Çäkçäk
- Churro
- Cider doughnut
- Coconut doughnut
- Cruller

D

- Dutchie

F

- Fánk
- Fasnacht
- Filhós
- Fried Coke
- Fried dough
- Fritelli
- Fritter
- Frittole
- Fritule
- Funnel cake

G

- Gogoși
- Gosh-e fil

I

- Imarti

J

- Jalebi
- Jelly doughnut

K

- Kleina
- Klenät
- Koeksister
- Kreple
- Krofne

L

- Lokma
- Long John
- Loukoumades
- Luther Burger

M

- Mahua
- Malasada
- Maple bacon donut
- Maple bar

N

- Nonnevot

O

- Oliebol
- Ox-tongue pastry

P

- Pączki
- Pastisset
- Pestiños
- Picarones
- Potato doughnut
- Prusurate
- Puff-puff

R

- Rosette

S

- Sabudana vada
- Sata andagi
- Sfenj
- Sgabeo
- Shuangbaotai
- Smultring
- Sopaipilla
- Sour cream doughnut
- Sufganiyah

T

- Timbits
- Toutin
- Tulumba

V

- Vada

Y

- Youtiao

Z

- Zeppole
Doughnuts

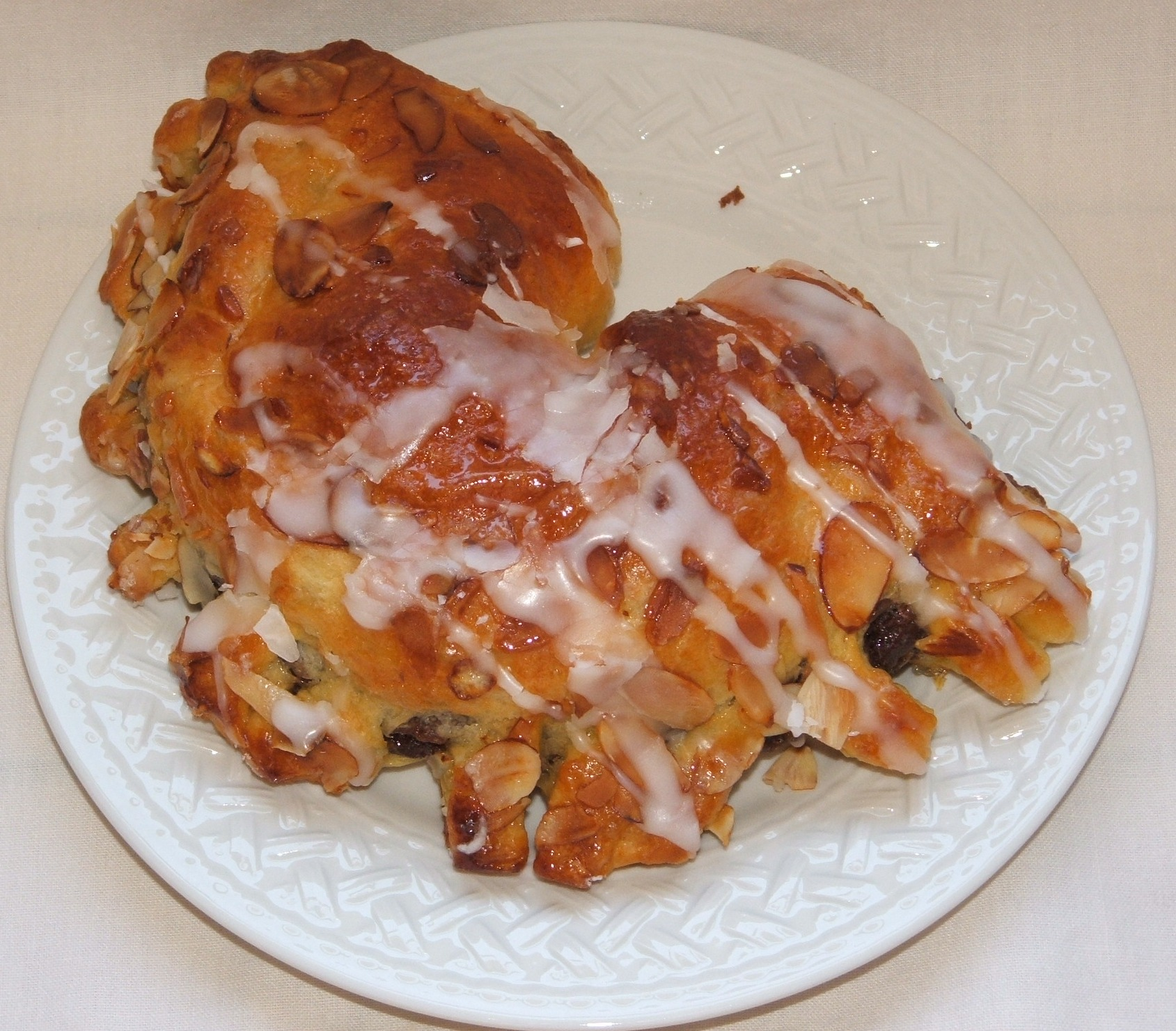
A bear claw

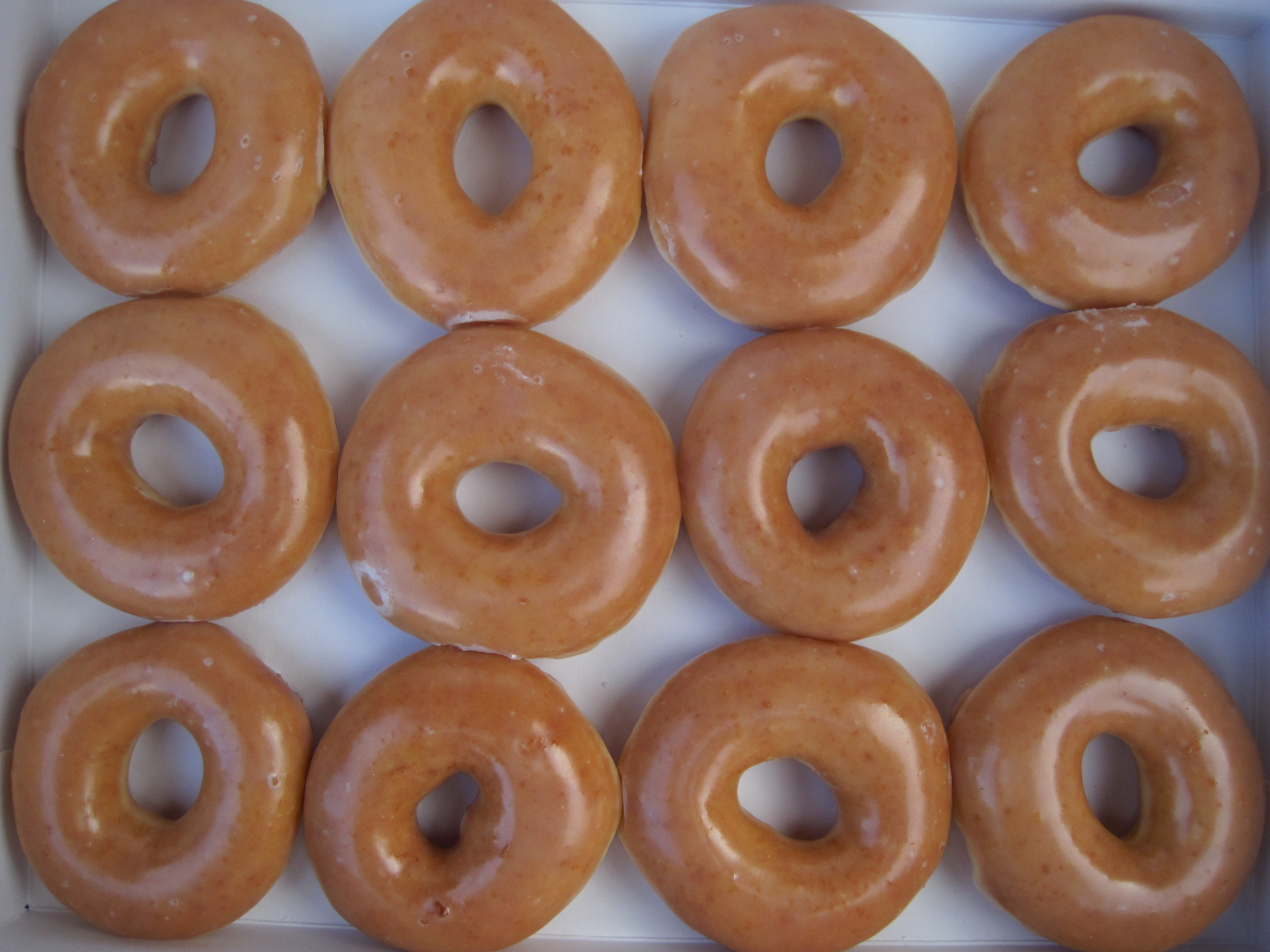
Glazed doughnuts

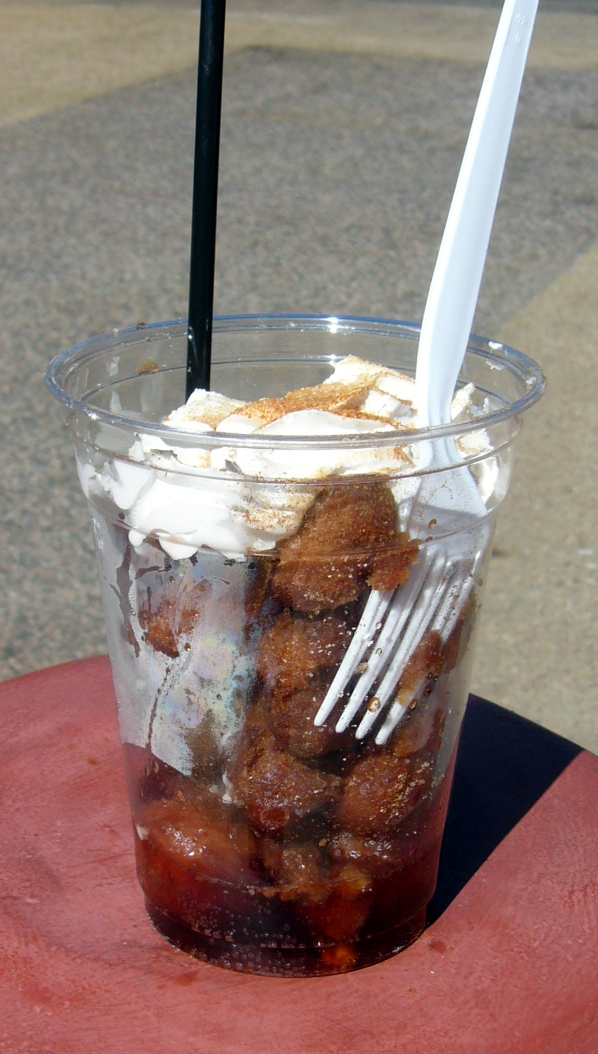
Fried Coke

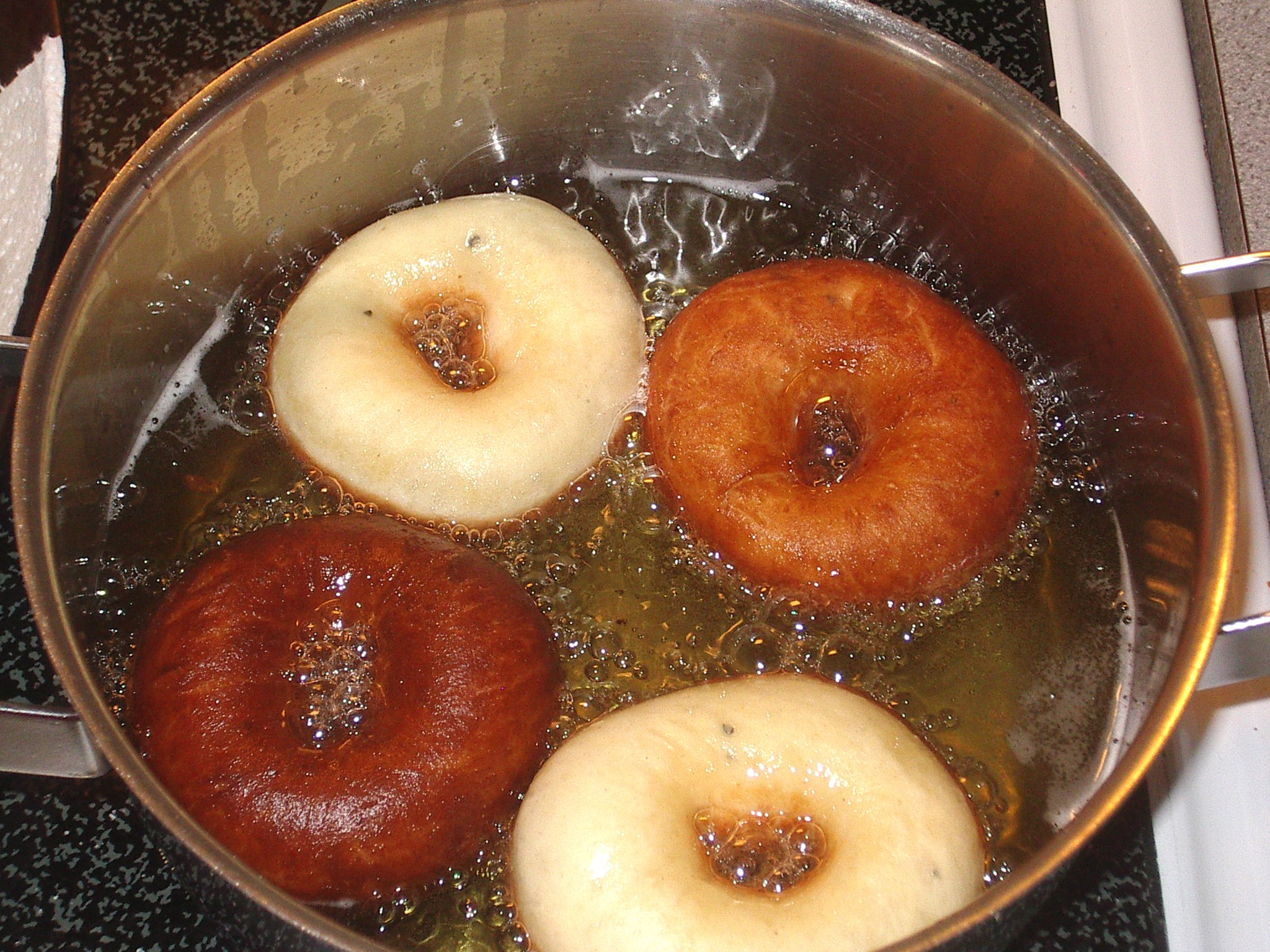
Smultringer frying

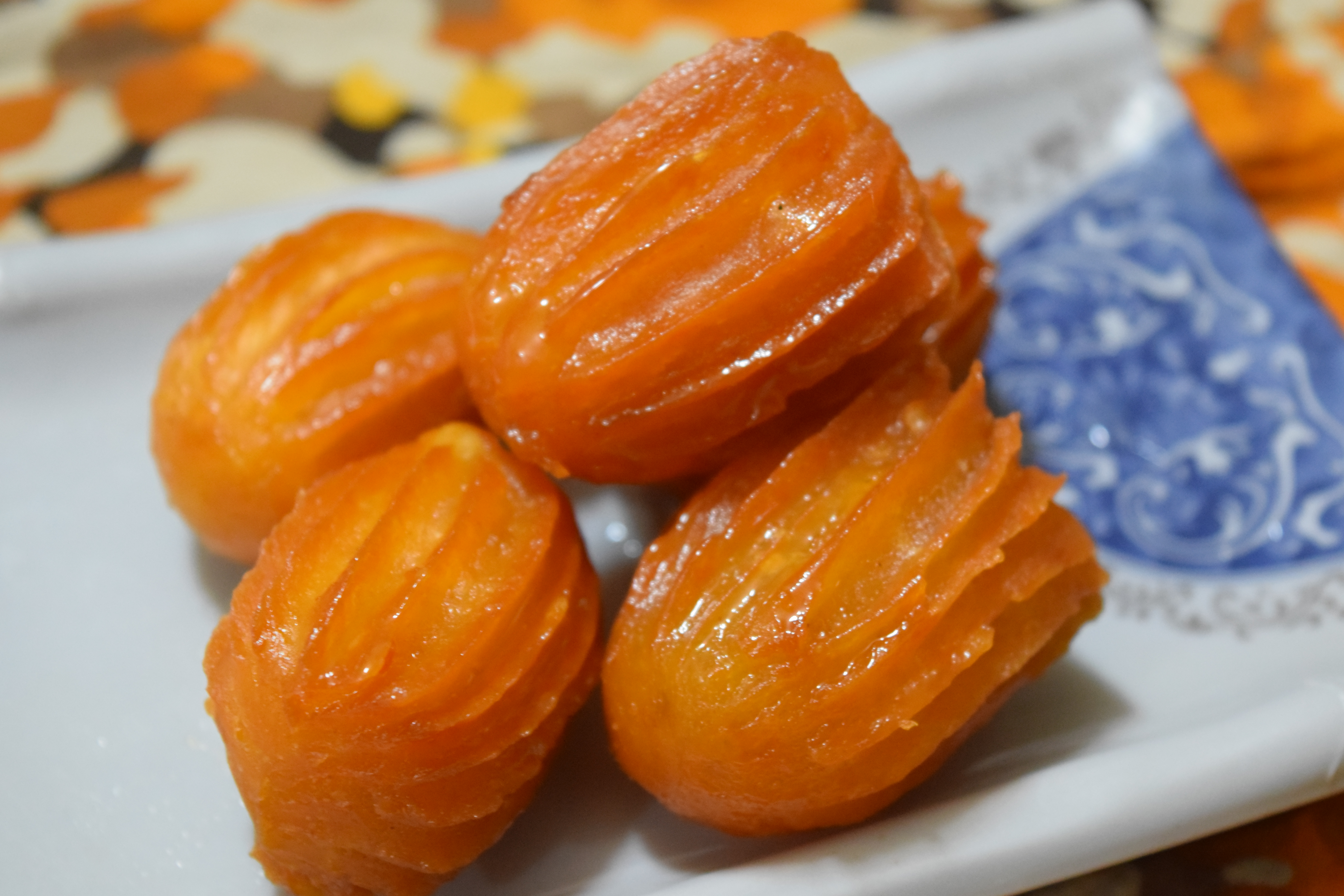
Tulumba

=== Frozen desserts ===
Frozen dessert is the generic name for desserts made by freezing liquids, semi-solids, and sometimes even solids.

A

- Açaí na tigela

B

- Baked Alaska
- Bombe glacée
- Bingsu

C

- Café liégeois
- Cendol
- Creme de papaya

F

- Faloodeh
- Frozen banana
- Frozen custard
- Frozen yogurt
- Frozie cup

G

- Gelato
- Givré
- Granita
- Grattachecca

H

- Halo-halo
- Huckabuck

I

- Ice cream
- Ice milk
- Ice buko
- Iskrambol
- Italian ice

K

- Kulfi

M

- Maíz con hielo
- Mellorine

N

- Nam khaeng sai

P

- Paleta
- Patbingsu
- Piragua
- Popsicle

R

- Rainbow sherbet

S

- Semifreddo
- Shave ice
- Shaved ice
- Slush
- Sno-ball
- Snow cone
- Snow cream
- Soft serve
- Sorbet
- Spoom

T

- Tartufo
- Tasaka Guri-Guri
- Tutti frutti

Z

- Zuccotto
Frozen desserts

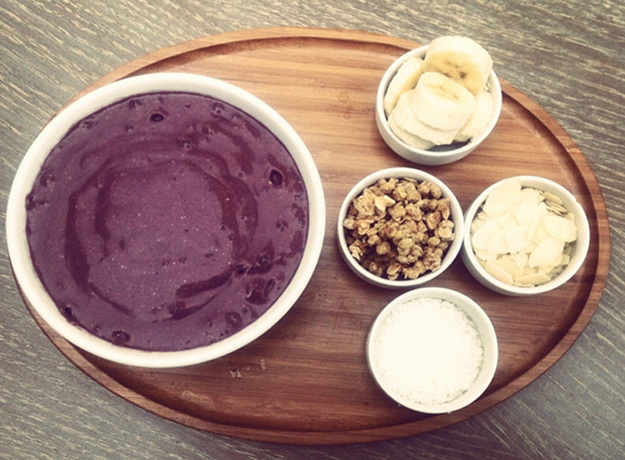
Açaí na tigela

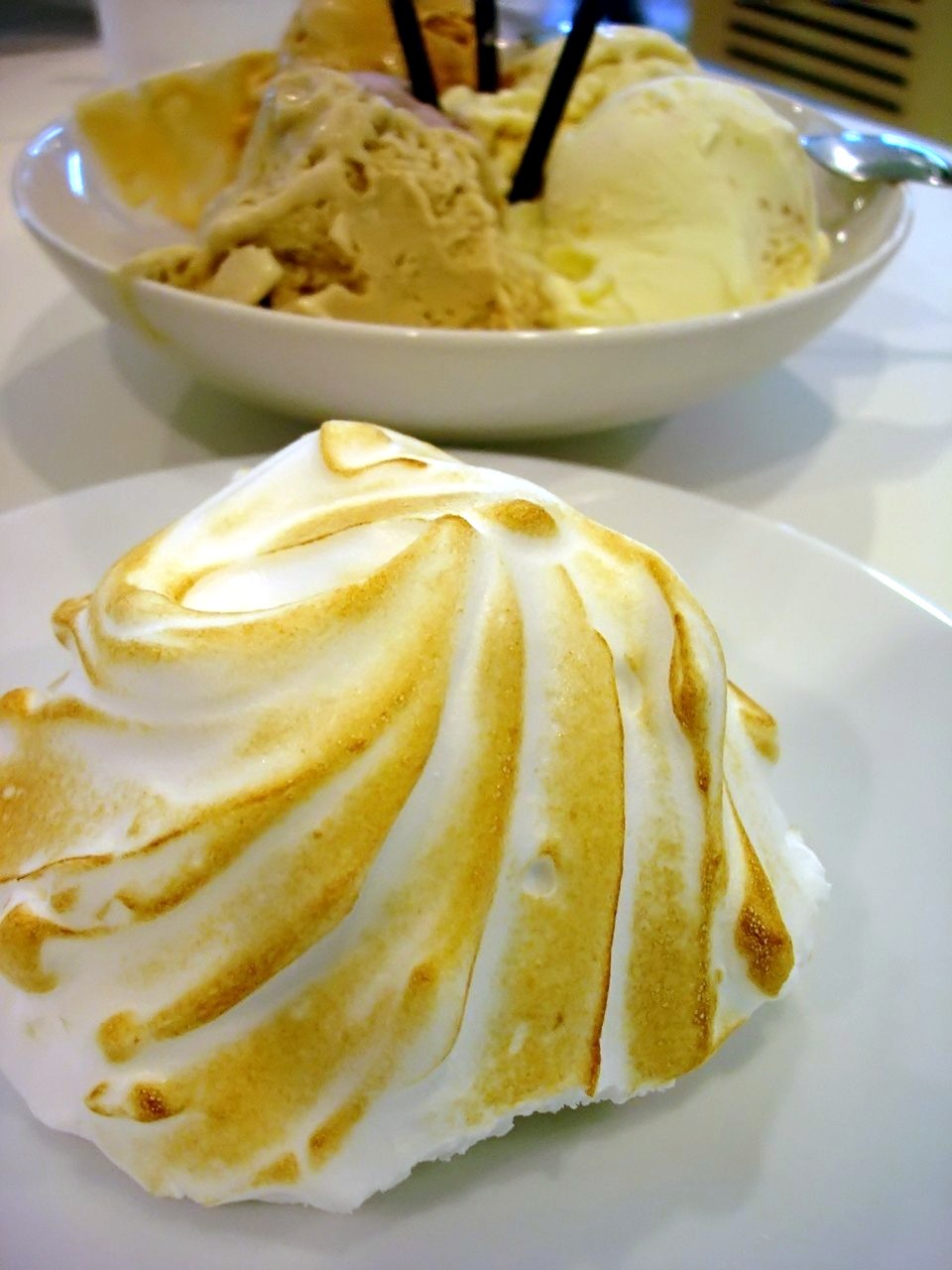
Baked Alaska

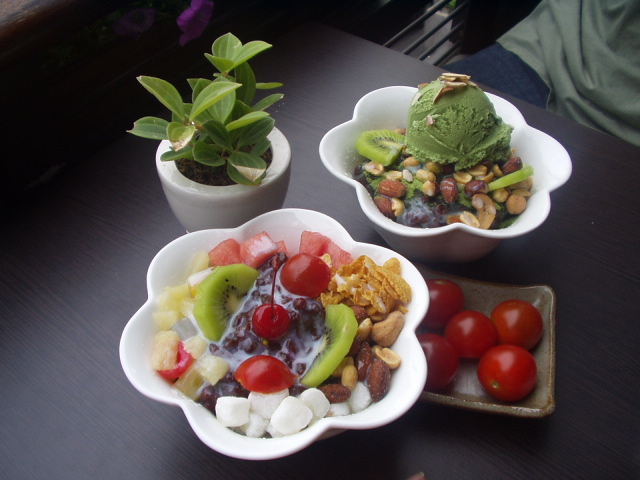
Patbingsu

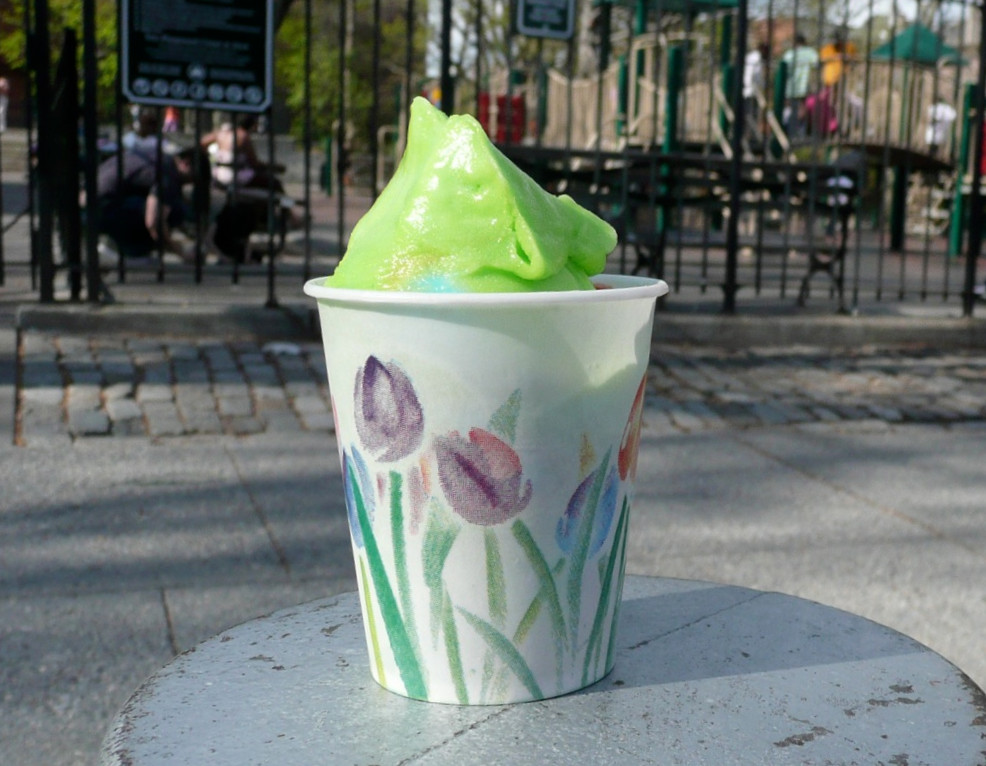
Italian ice

==== Ice cream ====
Ice cream is a frozen dessert usually made from dairy products, such as milk and cream and often combined with fruits or other ingredients and flavors. Ice cream became popular throughout the world in the second half of the 20th century after cheap refrigeration became common.

A

- Affogato
- Arctic roll

B

- Bacon sundae
- Baked Alaska
- Banana split
- Byakuya
- Biscuit Tortoni
- Booza

C

- Choc ice
- Chocolate chip cookie dough ice cream
- Choc-top
- Coffee cabinet

D

- Dairy mix
- Dame blanche
- Dippin' Dots
- Dondurma

F

- Flame on the iceberg
- Freeze-dried ice cream
- Fried ice cream

G

- Gelato
- Golden Opulence Sundae

I

- Ice cream bar
- Ice cream cake
- Ice cream cone
- Ice cream float
- Ice cream sandwich
- Ice cream soda
- Ice milk
- Indian ice cream (Alaska)
- Indian ice cream (Canada)

K

- Knickerbocker glory
- Kulfi

M

- Milkshake
- Mix-in
- Mochi ice cream
- Monaka

P

- Parfait
- Penny lick
- Plombières
- Plombir

R

- Raspberry ripple

S

- Screwball
- Snow cream
- Soft serve
- Sorbetes
- Spaghettieis
- Stracciatella
- Sundae

T

- Tutti frutti
Ice cream

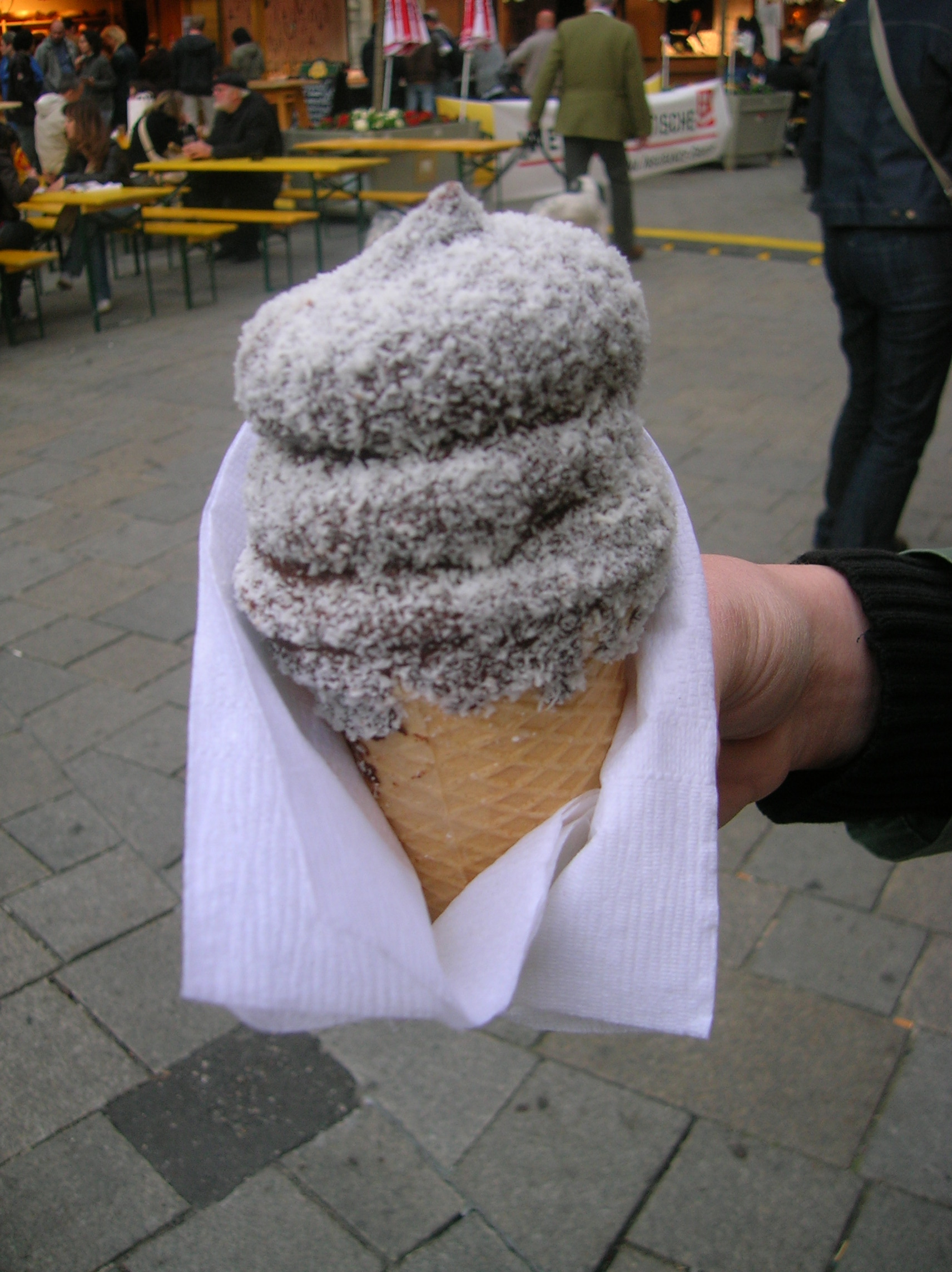
A choc-top

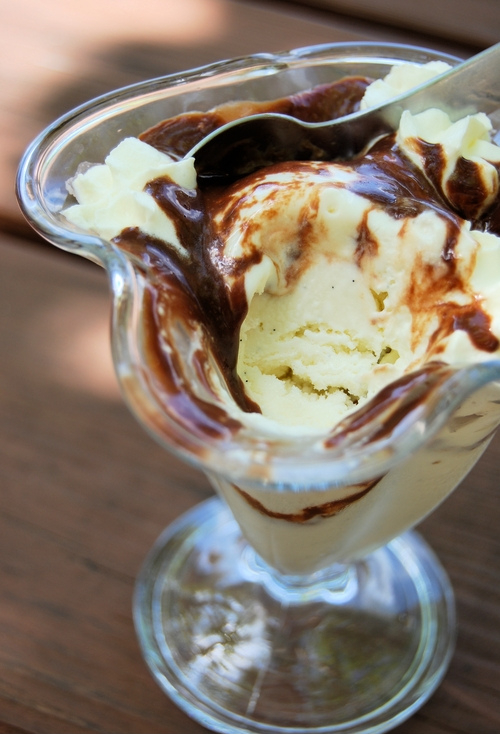
A dame blanche

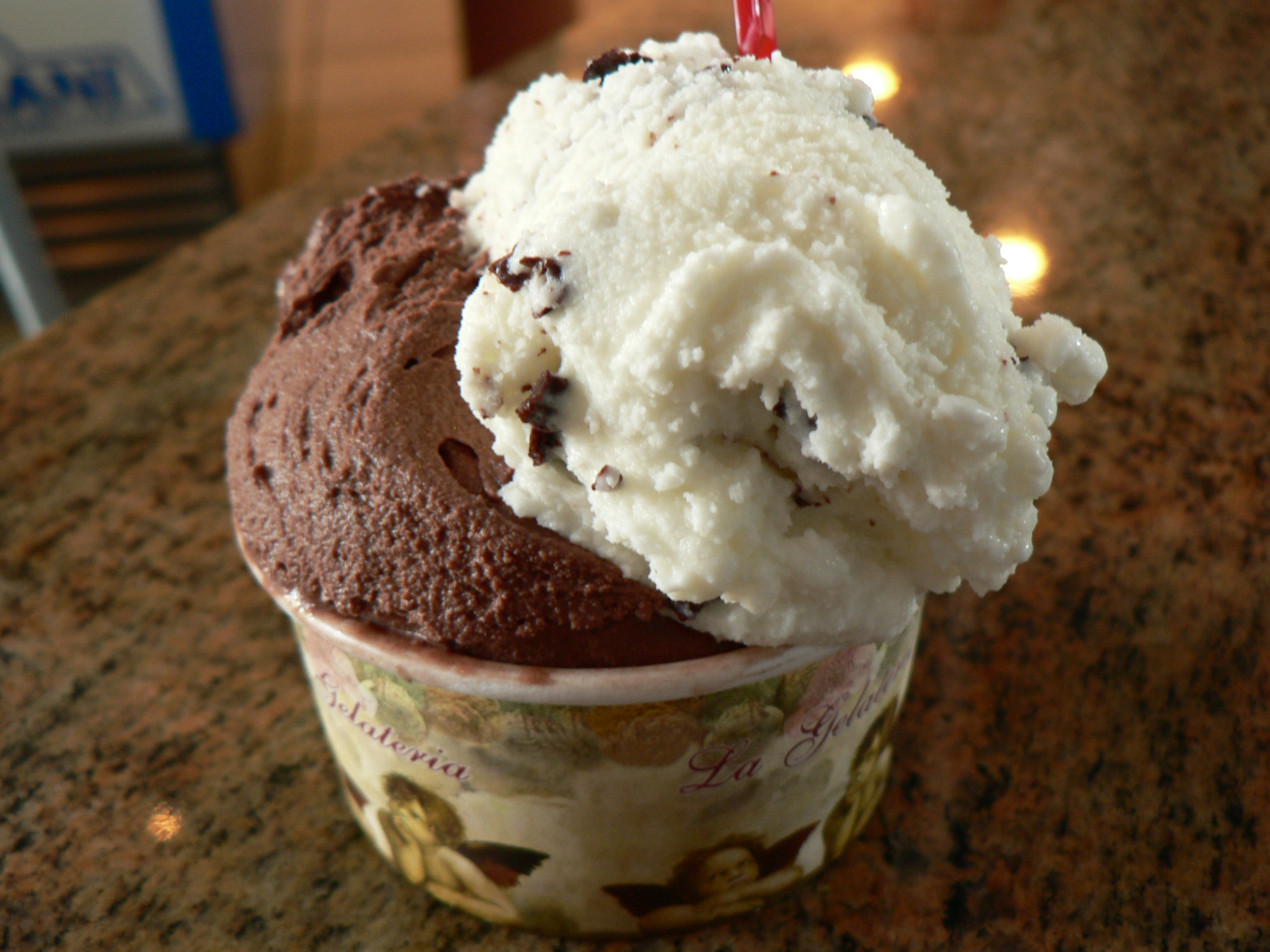
Stracciatella gelato

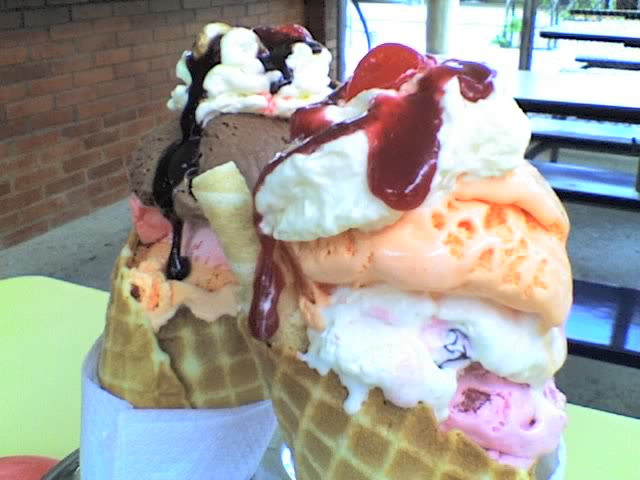
Ice cream cones

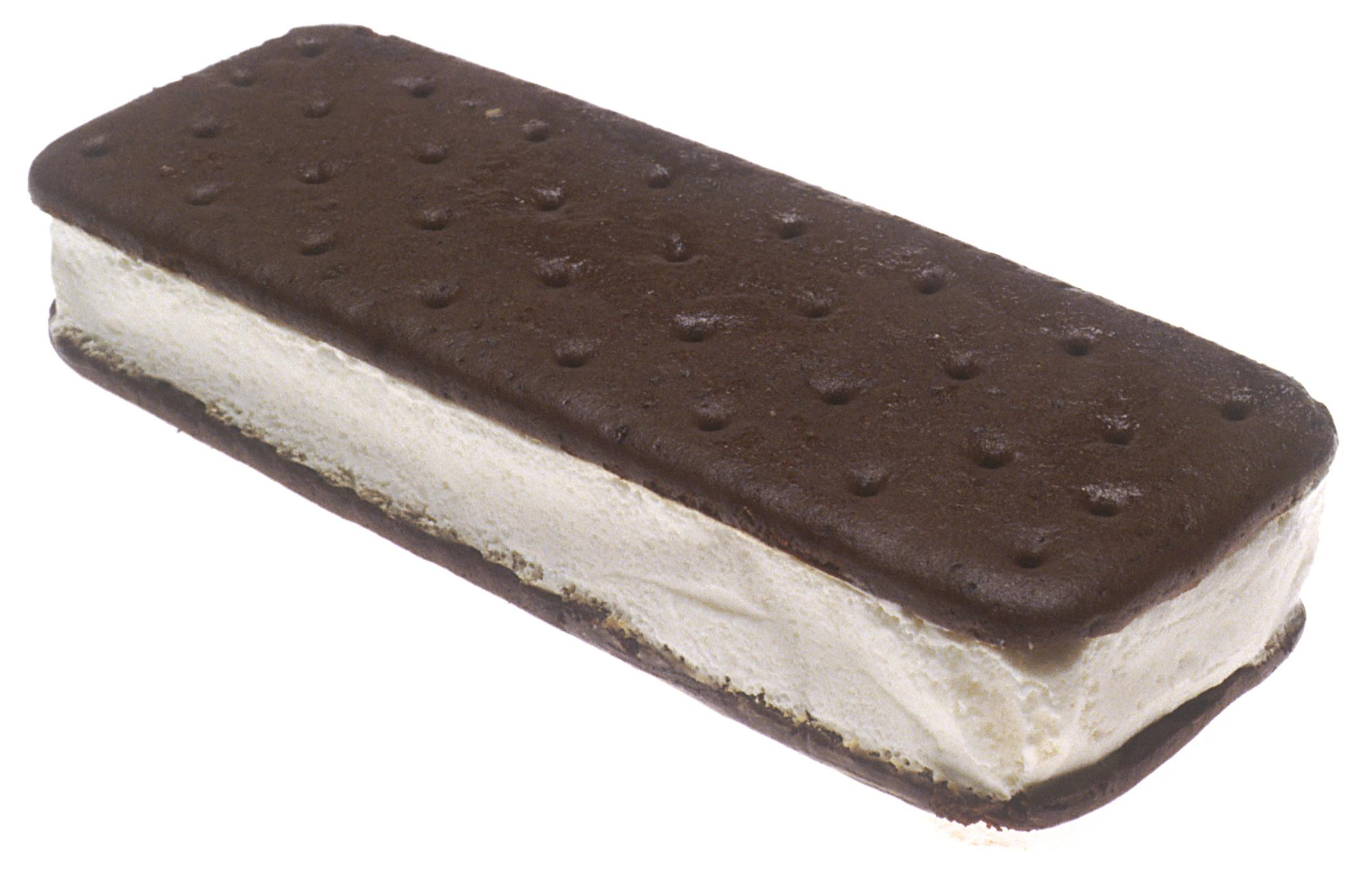
An ice cream sandwich

=== Pastries ===
Pastry is the name given to various kinds of baked products made from ingredients such as flour, sugar, milk, butter, shortening, baking powder, and eggs. Small tarts and other sweet baked products are called "pastries."

A

- Alexandertorte
- Allerheiligenstriezel
- Apple strudel
- Azerbaijani pakhlava

B

- Bakewell pudding
- Baklava
- Bakpia
- Bakpia pathok
- Bánh pía
- Banitsa
- Banket
- Bear claw
- BeaverTails
- Belekoy
- Belokranjska povitica
- Bethmännchen
- Birnbrot
- Bizcocho
- Blachindla
- Bougatsa
- Boyoz
- Briouat
- Bruttiboni

C

- Carac
- ChaSan
- Chorley cake
- Chouquette
- Choux pastry
- Cinnamon roll
- Coca
- Coussin de Lyon
- Cream horn
- Churro
- Cronut
- Cuban pastry

D

- Danish pastry
- Djevrek

E

- Eccles cake
- Ensaïmada

F

- Fa gao
- Fazuelos
- Fig roll
- Fish-shaped pastry
- Flaky pastry
- Flaons
- Flies graveyard
- Franzbrötchen

G

- Gâteau Basque
- Gibanica
- Gözleme
- Gundain
- Gyeongju bread

H

- Haddekuche
- Heong Peng
- Honey bun

I

- Inipit

J

- Jachnun
- Jalebi

K

- Kalács
- Kanafeh
- Kitchener bun
- Knieküchle
- Krempita
- Kringle
- Kroštule
- Kürtőskalács

L

- Lattice
- Leipziger Lerche
- London Cheesecake

M

- Ma'amoul
- Makroudh
- Malsouka
- Mandelkubb
- Mantecadas
- Marillenknödel
- Masan
- Miguelitos
- Milhoja
- Milk-cream strudel
- Mooncake
- Moorkop

N

- Nǎiyóu sū bǐng
- Nun's puffs

P

- Pan dulce
- Papanași
- Pastel
- Pastry heart
- Phyllo
- Pineapple cake
- Pionono
- Plăcintă
- Pretzel
- Profiterole
- Puff pastry
- Punsch-roll
- Punschkrapfen

Q

- Qottab
- Quesito

R

- Rab cake
- Remonce
- Roti tissue
- Roze koek
- Runeberg's torte

S

- Sad cake
- Schnecken
- Schneeball
- Semla
- Shortcrust pastry
- Şöbiyet
- Sou
- Spanisch Brötli
- Spritzkuchen
- Streusel
- Strudel
- Stutenkerl
- Suncake
- Sufganiyah
- Sweetheart cake

T

- Tahini roll
- Toaster pastry
- Torpedo dessert
- Tortell
- Tortita negra
- Tu
- Turnover

U

- Uštipci
- Utap

V

- Vatrushka
- Vetkoek
- Vol-au-vent

W Y

- Yurla

Z

- Zeeuwse bolus
- Žemlovka

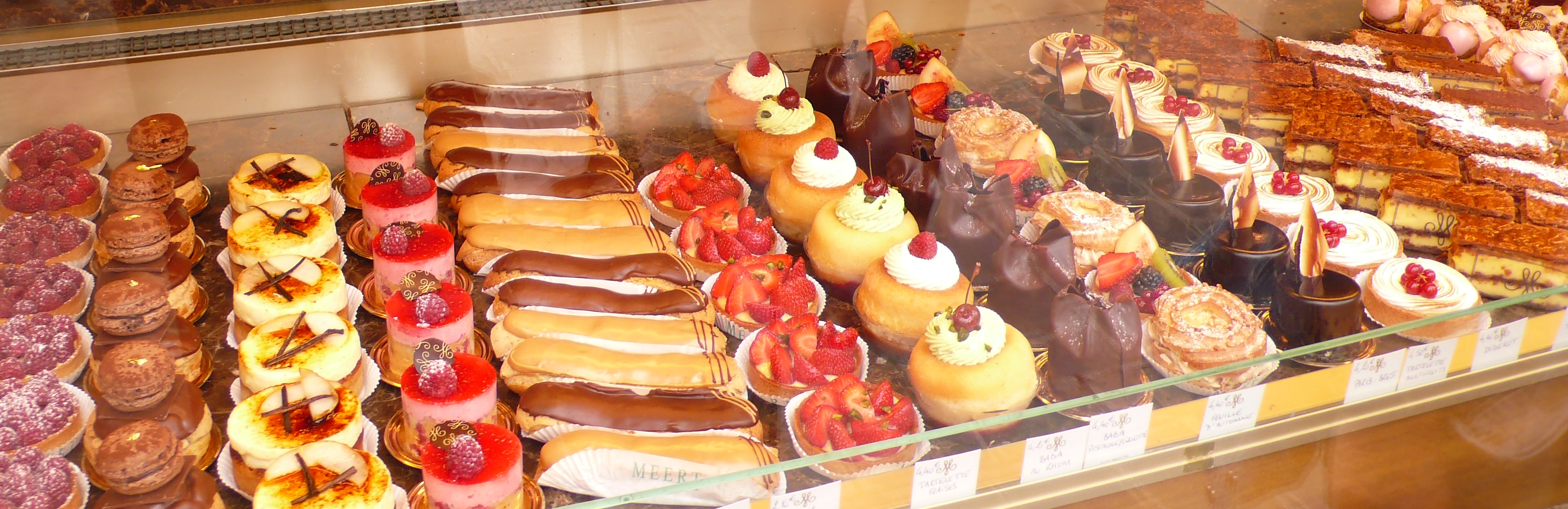
An assortment of pastries and cakes in a pâtisserie

==== Pastries with poppy seeds ====
- Chatti Pathiri
- Hamantash
- Kifli
- Kolach
- Kołacz
- Kūčiukai
- Nunt
- Nut roll
- Poppy seed roll
- Prekmurska gibanica
- Rugelach

=== Pies ===
A pie is a baked dish which is usually made of a pastry dough casing that covers or completely contains a filling of various sweet or savoury ingredients.

==== Sweet pies ====
A

- Apple pie

B

- Bakewell tart
- Banoffee pie
- Bean pie
- Bedfordshire clanger
- Black bun
- Blackberry pie
- Blueberry pie
- Buko pie
- Bumbleberry pie
- Buttermilk pie

C

- Cheesecake
- Cherry pie
- Chess pie
- Cobbler
- Cookie cake pie
- Cream pie
- Custard pie
- Custard tart

D

- Derby pie

F

- Flapper pie
- Fried pie

G

- Grape pie

K

- Key lime pie
- Kuchen

L

- Lemon ice box pie
- Lemon meringue pie

M

- Manchester tart
- Mince pie
- Mississippi mud pie

P

- Pecan pie
- Pirog
- Pumpkin pie

R

- Rhubarb pie
- Rijstevlaai
- Rönttönen

S

- Saskatoonberry pie
- Shaker lemon pie
- Shoofly pie
- Smulpaj
- Snickers pie
- Strawberry pie
- Strawberry rhubarb pie
- Sugar pie
- Sugar cream pie
- Sweet potato pie

T

- Tarta de Santiago
- Treacle tart

V

- Vlaai
Pies

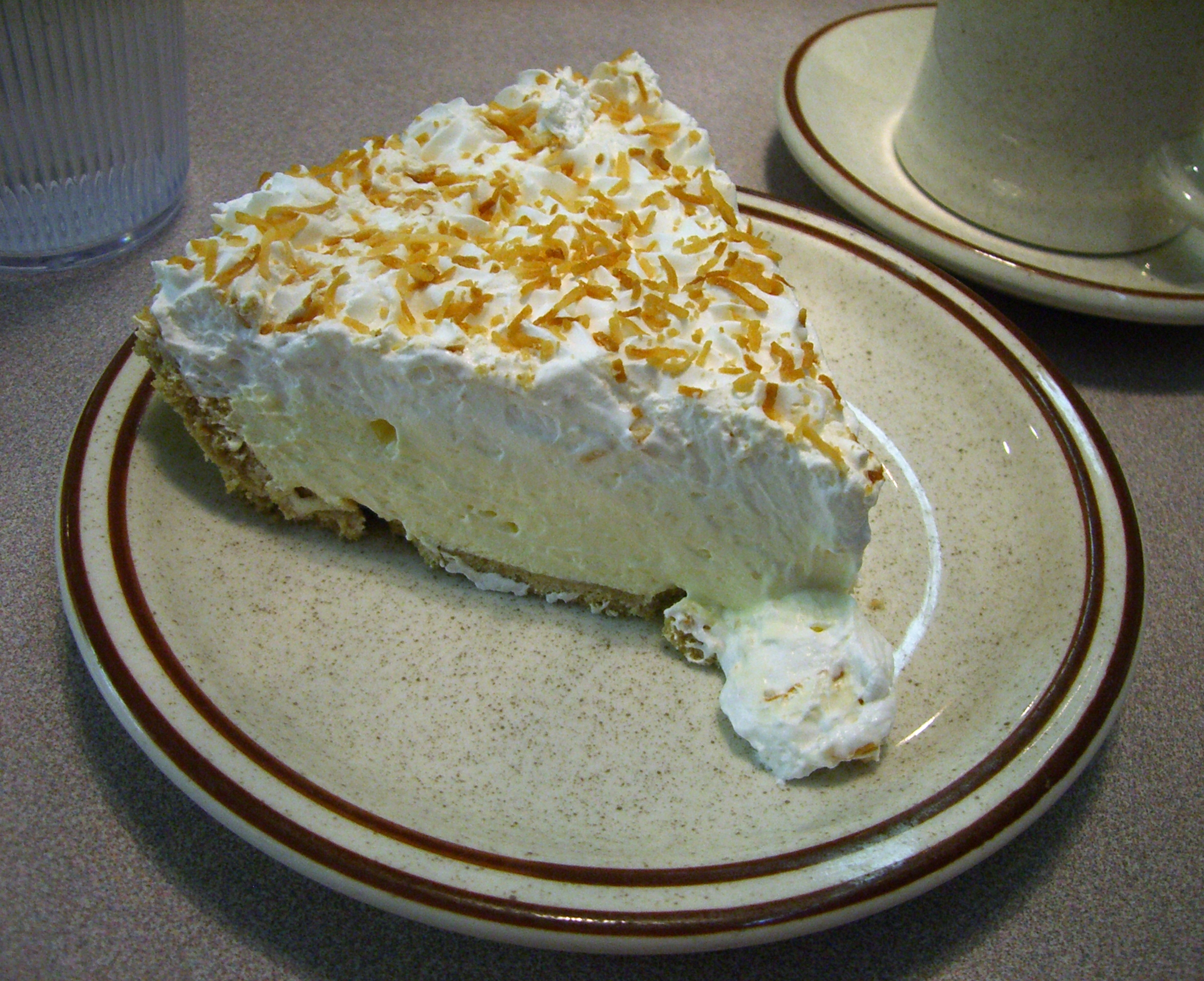
Coconut cream pie

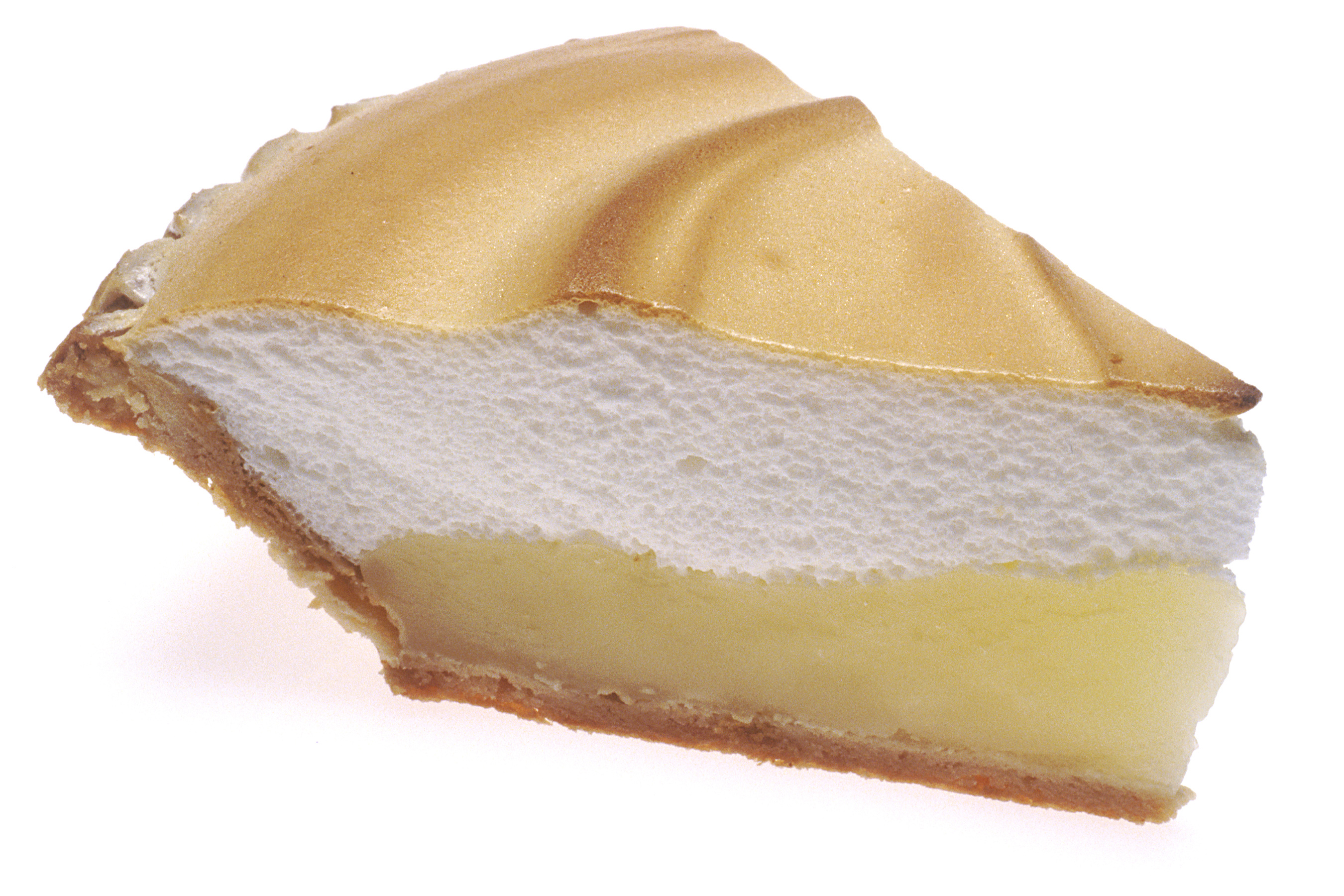
Lemon meringue pie

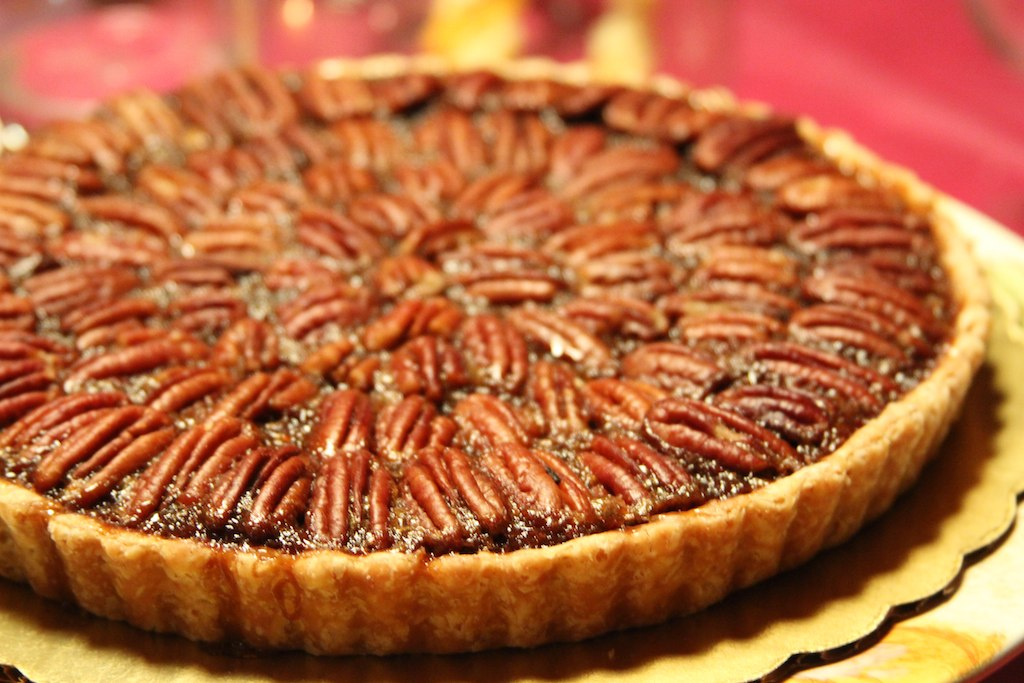
Pecan pie

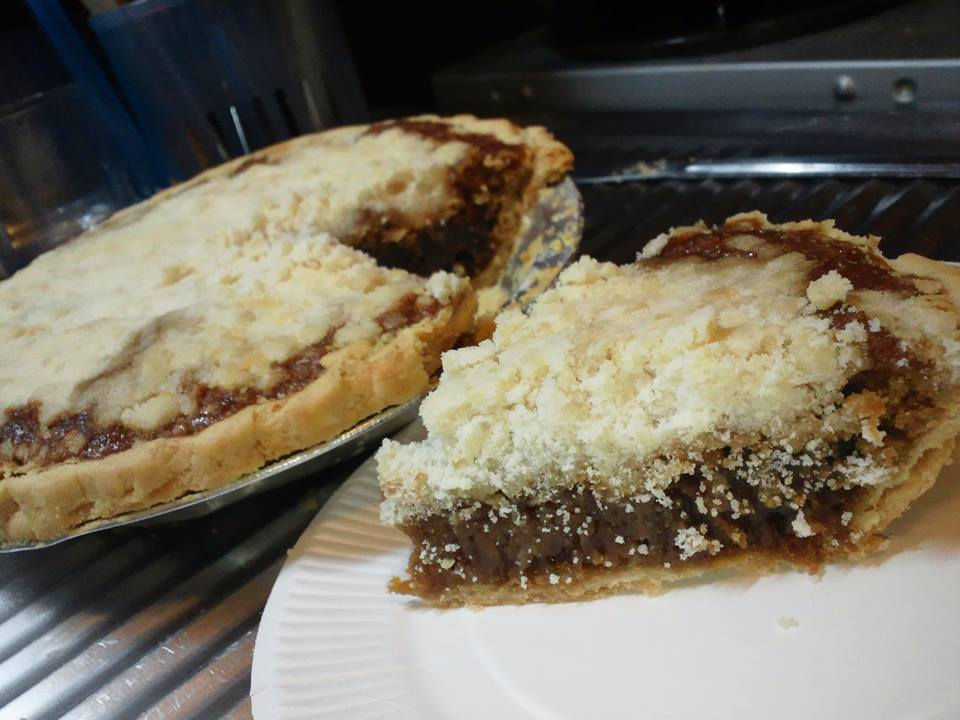
Shoofly pie

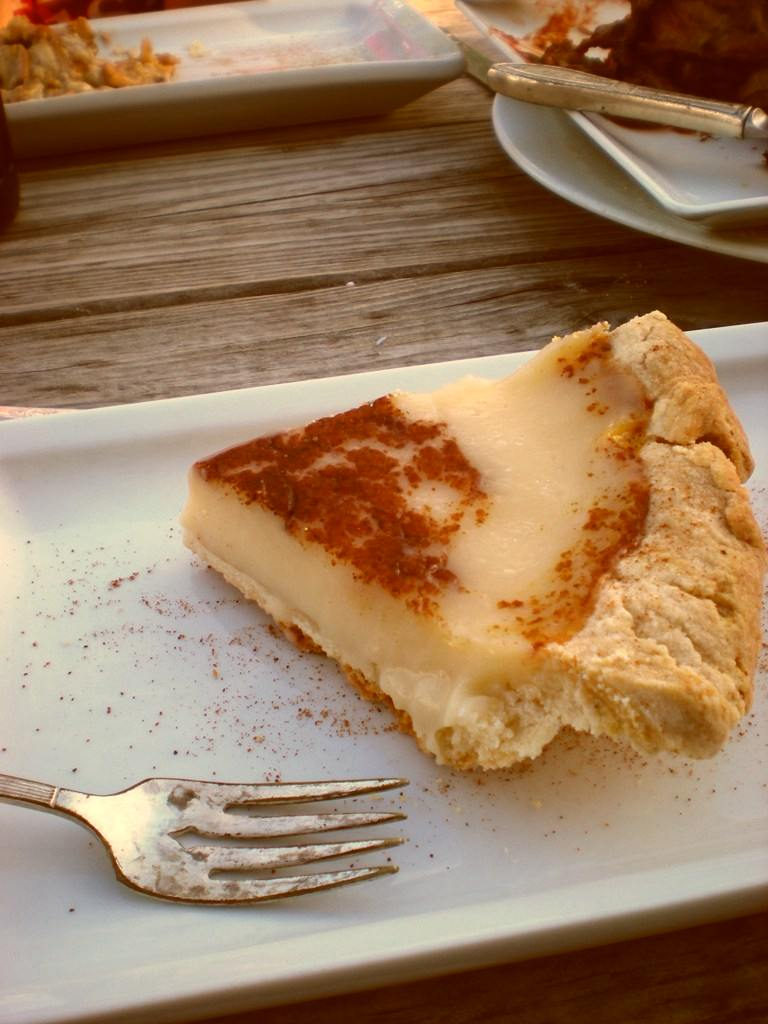
Sugar cream pie

==== Tarts ====
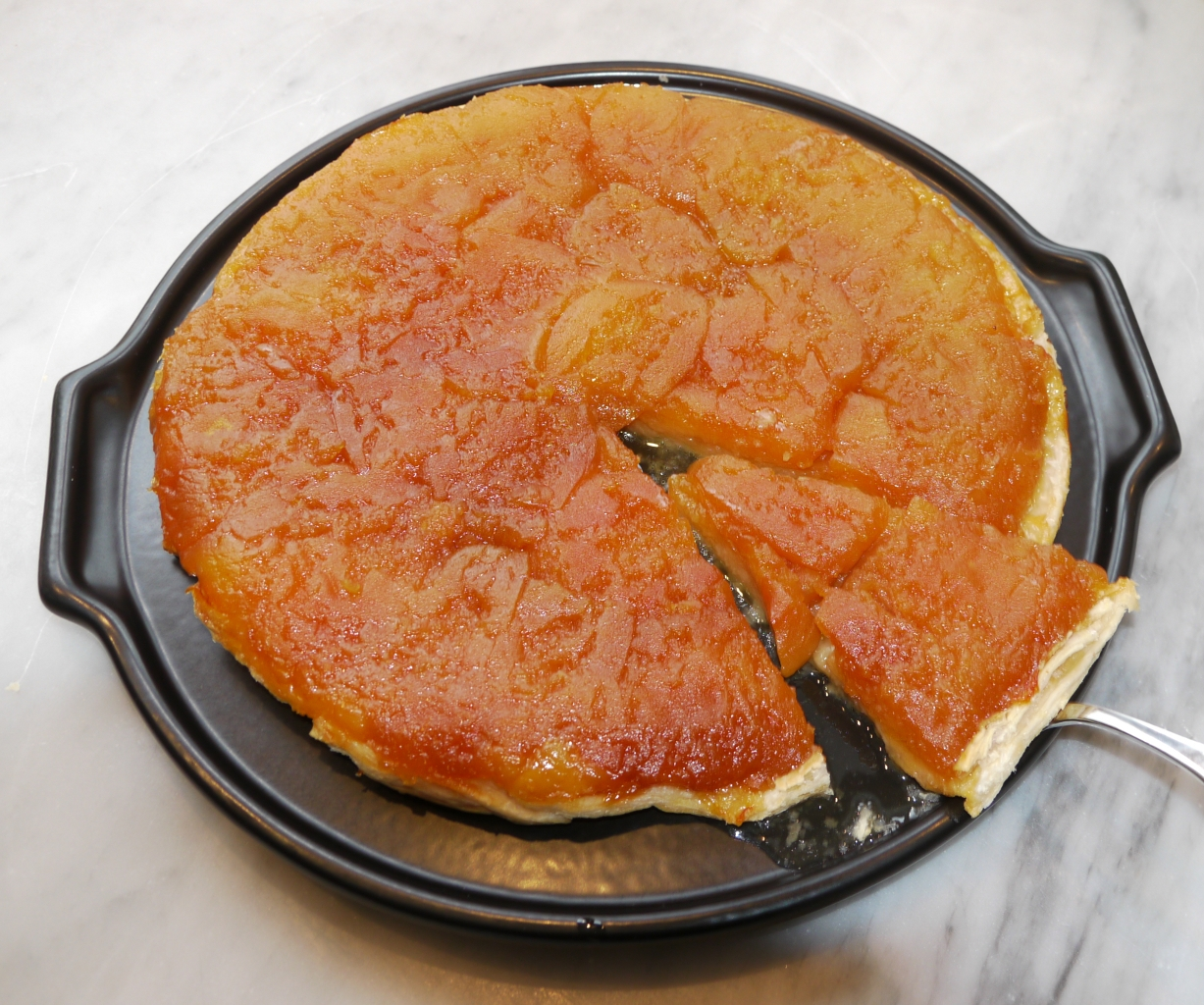
Tarte Tatin

A tart is a baked dish consisting of a filling over a pastry base with an open top not covered with pastry. The pastry is usually shortcrust pastry; the filling may be sweet or savory, though modern tarts are usually fruit-based, sometimes with custard.

- Bakewell tart
- Butter tart
- Caramel tart
- Charlotte
- Chocolate tart
- Conversation tart
- Crostata
- Custard tart
- Egg tart
- Gizzada
- Gypsy tart
- Lemon tart
- Manchester tart
- Melktert
- Neenish tart
- Norman Tart
- Pastel de nata
- Pineapple tart
- Quetschentaart
- Rhubarb tart
- Tarte à la Bouillie
- Tarte Tatin
- Treacle tart

=== Puddings ===
Pudding is usually a dessert, but it can also be a savory dish. In the United Kingdom and most Commonwealth countries, pudding can be used to describe both sweet and savory dishes. However, unless qualified, the term in everyday usage typically denotes a dessert. In the United States and Canada, pudding characteristically denotes a sweet milk-based dessert similar in consistency to egg-based custards, instant custards, or a mousse.

A

- Ábrystir
- Almond jelly
- Ashure
- Asida

B

- Bakewell pudding
- Banana pudding
- Bánh chuối
- Bebinca
- Blancmange
- Blodpalt
- Bread pudding
- Brown Betty

C

- Capirotada
- Carrot pudding
- Chè
- Cheese pudding
- Chocolate biscuit pudding
- Chocolate pudding
- Christmas pudding
- Clootie dumpling
- Cottage Pudding

D

- Diplomat pudding
- Dutch baby pancake

F

- Figgy duff
- Flummadiddle
- Flummery
- Fruit pudding
- Frumenty

G

- Goody
- Götterspeise

H

- Hasty pudding
- Haupia
- Herrencreme

J

- Junket

K

- Kalamai
- Kirschenmichel
- Kulolo
- Kutia

M

- Malva pudding
- Mango pudding
- Monmouth Pudding

P

- Panna cotta
- Persimmon pudding
- Pistachio pudding
- Po'e
- Put chai ko

R

- Rice pudding
- Rødgrød
- Rømmegrøt
- Rožata

S

- Sago pudding
- Semolina pudding

T

- Tapioca pudding
- Tembleque

W

- Welf pudding
Puddings

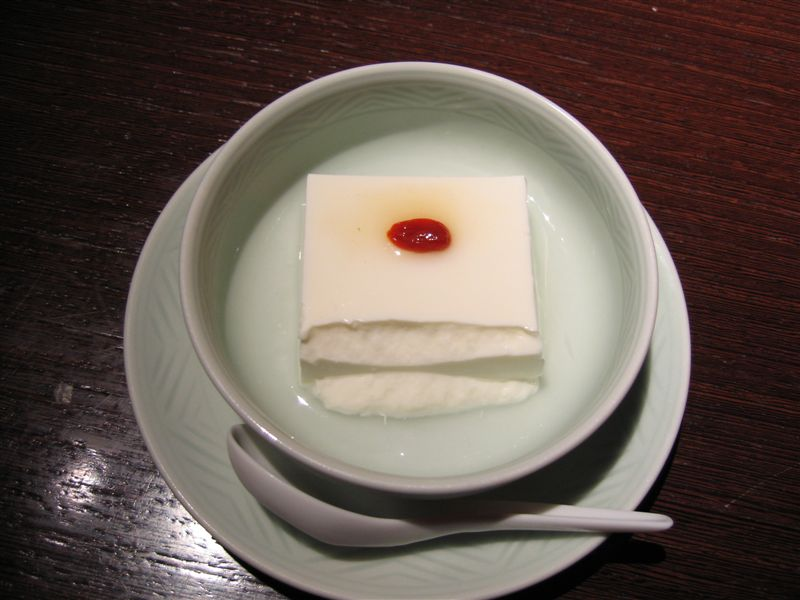
Almond jelly

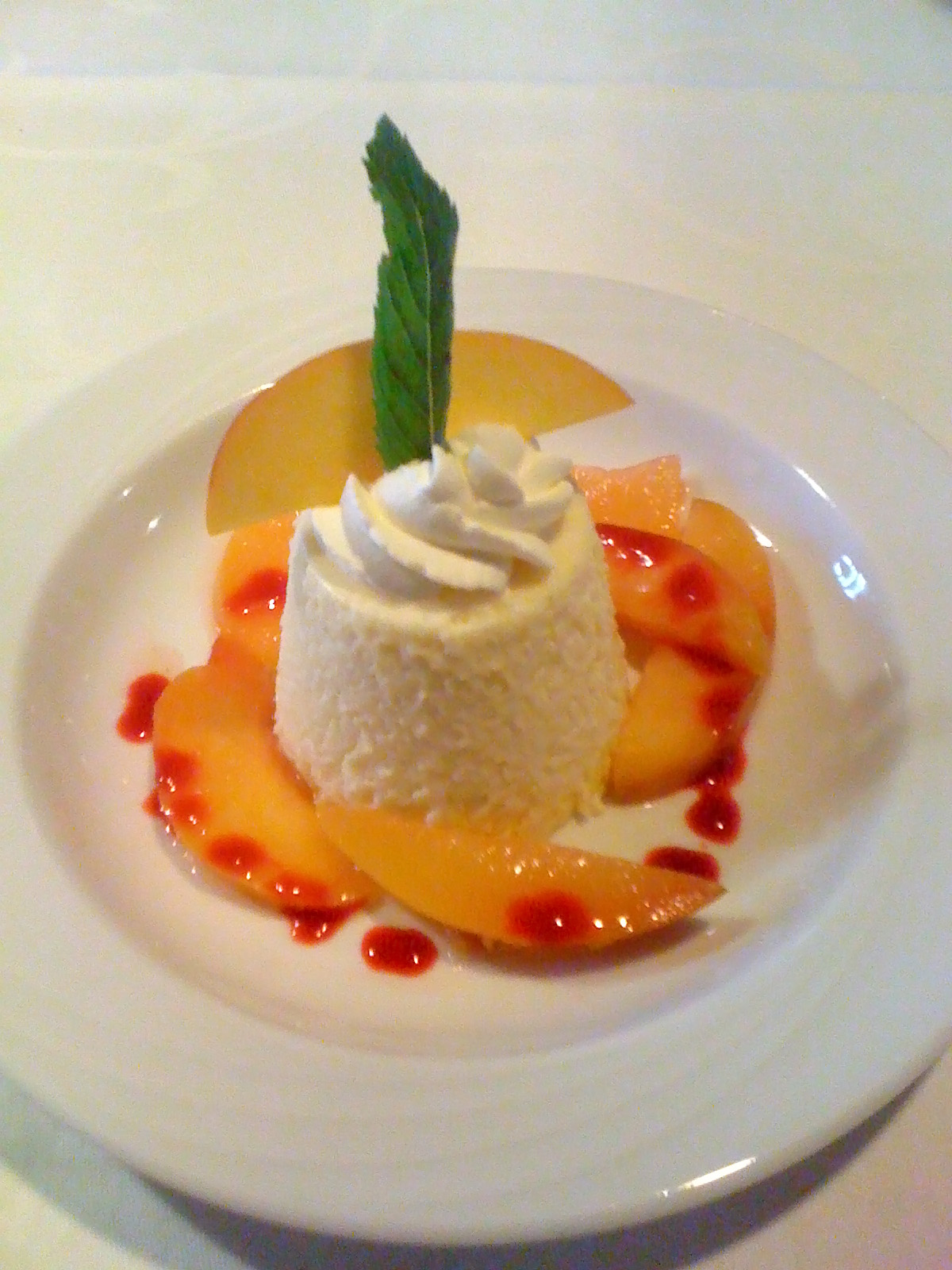
Flummery

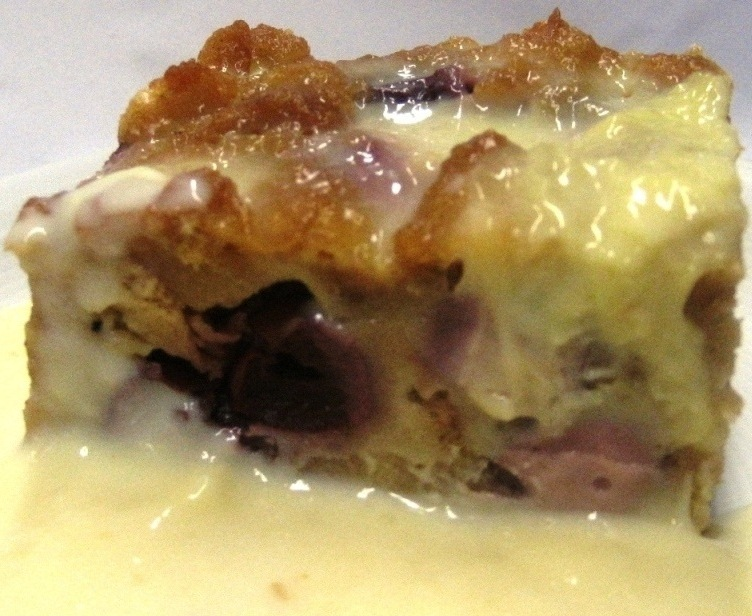
Kirschenmichel

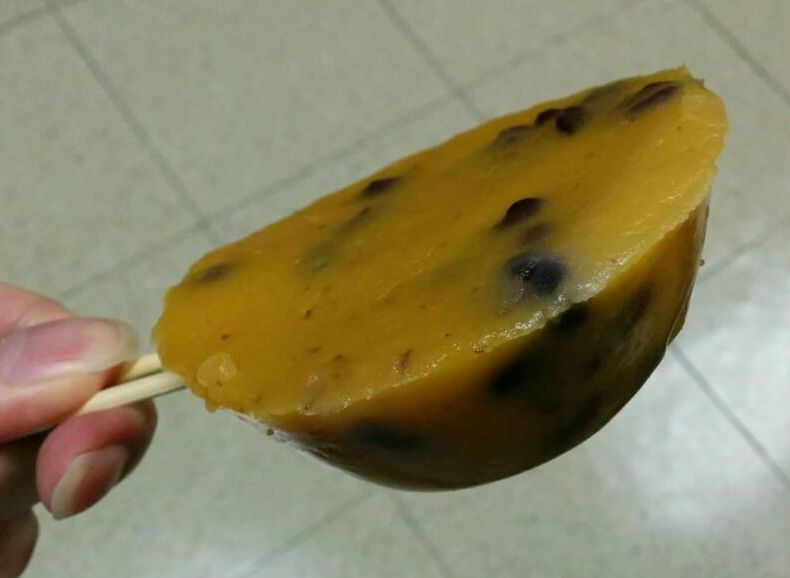
Put chai ko is a popular snack in Hong Kong.

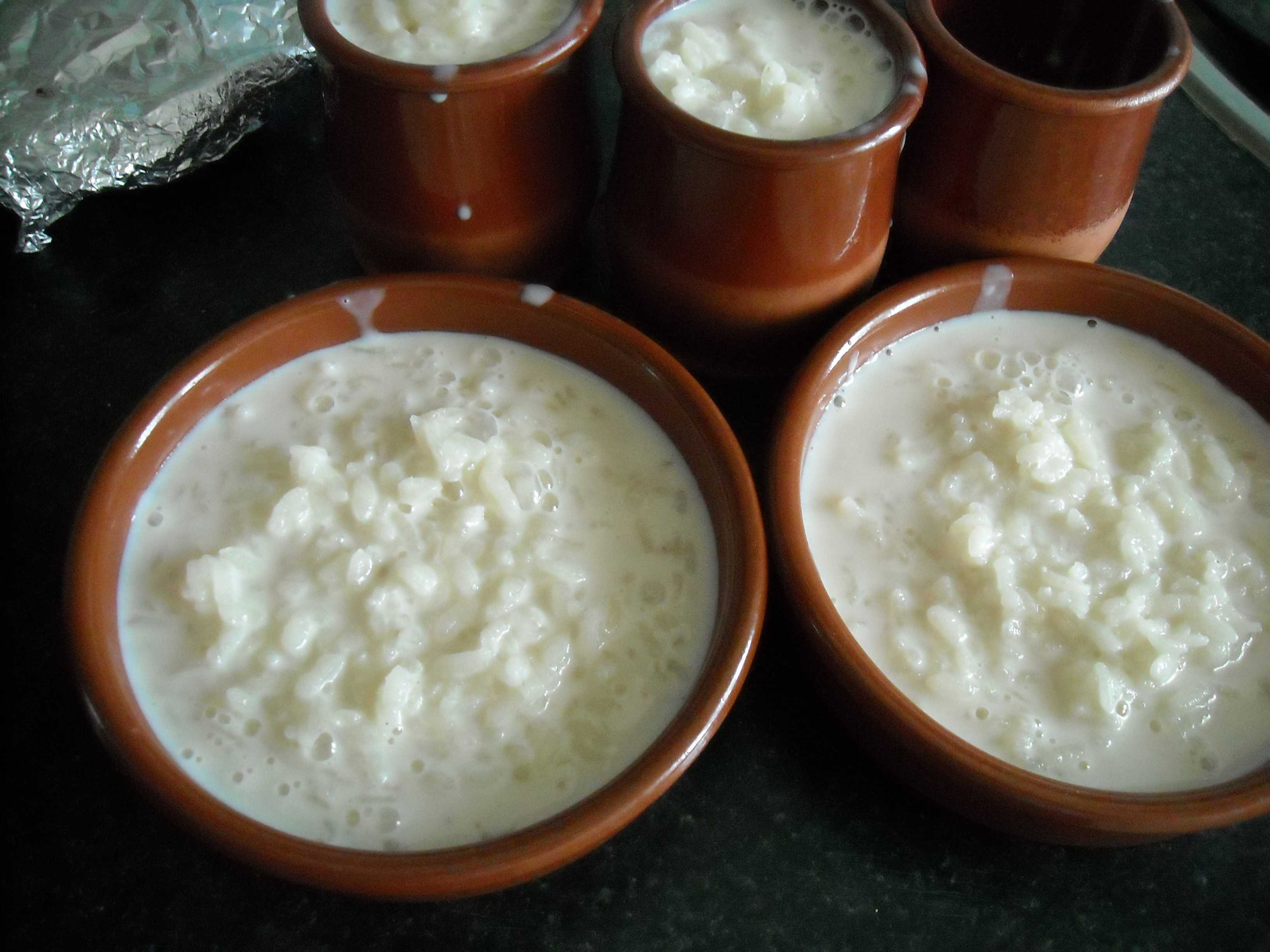
Rice pudding

== By country ==
=== Algeria ===
- Arayech
- Baklawa
- Bézid
- Bradj
- Chrik
- Créponnê
- Fanid
- Makrout Louz
- Charek
- Knidlet
- Dziriyet
- Sfendj
- Rfiss
- Mkhabez
- Tahboult n'tmelaline
- Tabaa
- Tamina
- Tamina dziriya
- Tej el moulouk
- Bniwen
- Boussou La Tmessou
- Kalb el louz
- Kastel annabi
- Ktayef
- Zirawi
- Zrira

=== Argentina ===
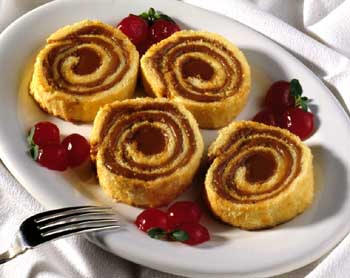
Argentine pionono with dulce de leche

=== Armenia ===
- Aghablit
- Adzik
- Alani
- Baghardzh
- Barourik
- Beeshee
- Bkhbkhik
- Cigarette cookies
- Gata
- Kaghtsr sujukh
- Marlenka
- Mikado
- Nazook
- Nshablit
- Pakhlava
- Pastegh
- Shakarats
- Shakarshee
- Sharots
- Shpot
- T'tu lavash
- Yughatert

=== Australia ===
- Anzac biscuit
- Chocolate crackles
- Fairy bread
- Frog cake
- Hedgehog slice
- Icebox cake
- Jelly slice
- Lamington
- Neenish tart
- Pavlova
- White Christmas

=== Azerbaijan ===
- Azerbaijani pakhlava
- Badambura
- Shekerbura
- Shorgoghali

=== Bangladesh ===
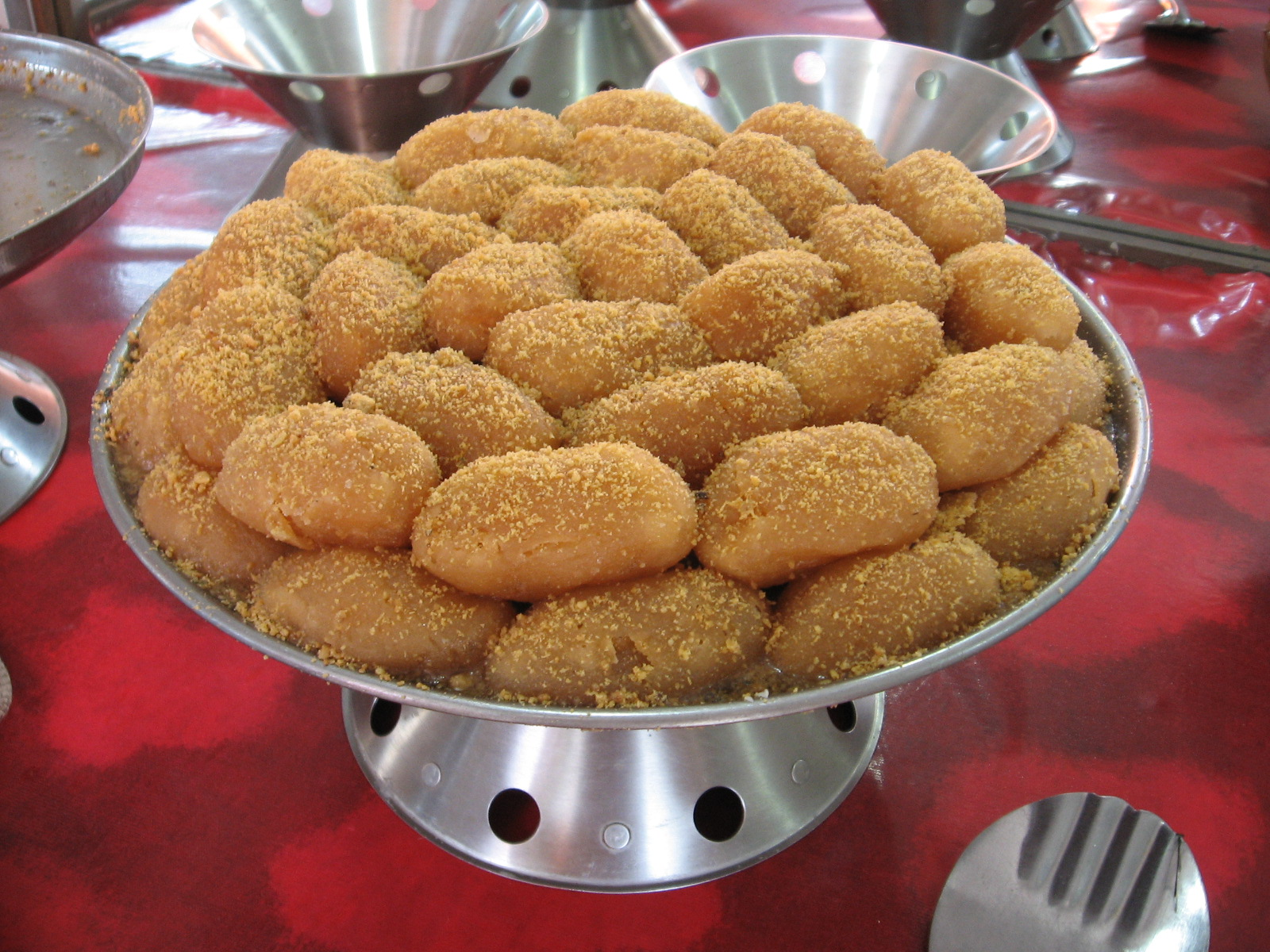
Chomchom, traditional Bengali sweet originated from Porabari, Tangail, Bangladesh.

=== Bosnia and Herzegovina ===
- Tufahija

=== Brazil ===
- Açaí na tigela
- Beijinho
- Bolo de rolo
- Brigadeiro
- Cajuzinho
- Canjica
- Creme de papaya
- Cuajada
- Curau
- Goiabada
- Manjar branco
- Maria-mole
- Paçoca
- Pamonha
- Papo-de-anjo
- Pé-de-moleque
- Quindim

=== Canada ===
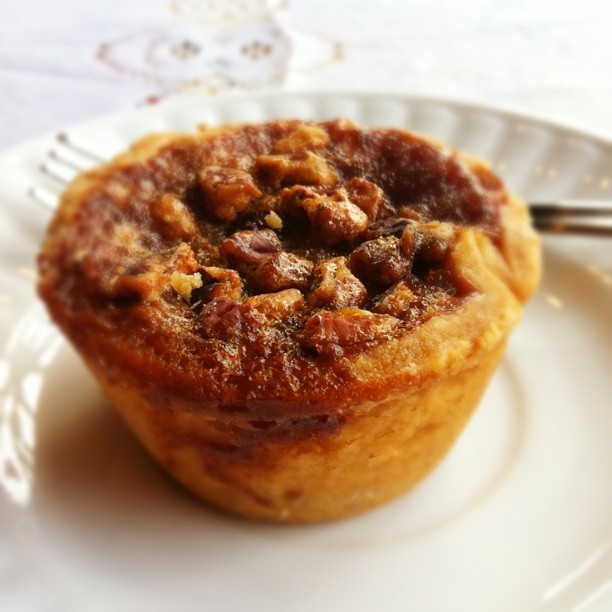
A pecan butter tart

- BeaverTails
- Butter tart
- Nanaimo bar
- Persian
- Pouding chômeur
- Saskatoonberry pie
- Sugar pie

=== Chile ===
- Chilean cuisine – Sweets, cakes, and desserts
- Kuchen
- Mote con huesillo
- Murta con membrillo

=== Czechia ===
- Kolach
- Marlenka
- Míša

=== Finland ===
- Finnish cuisine – Desserts

=== France ===
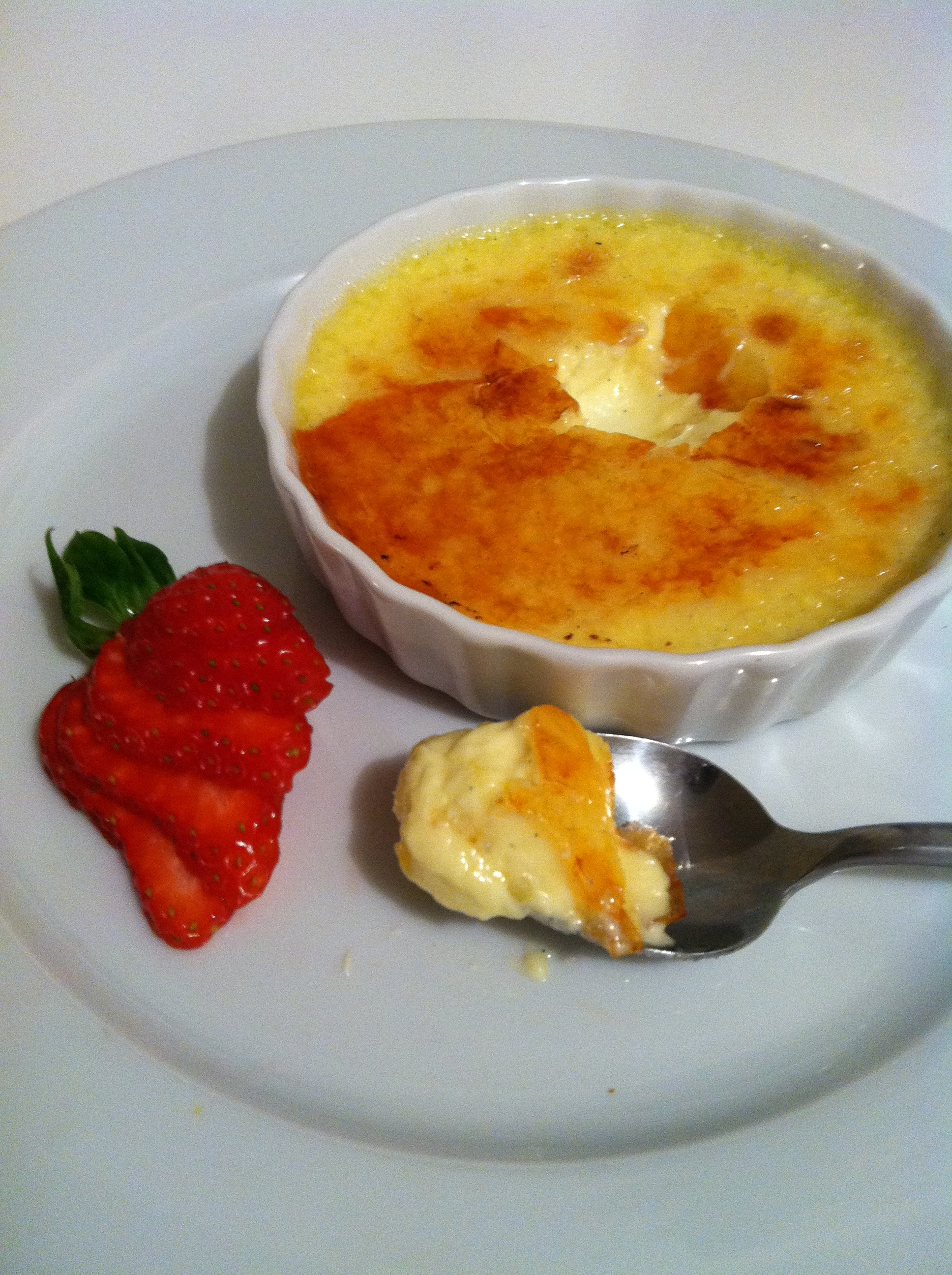
Crème brûlée

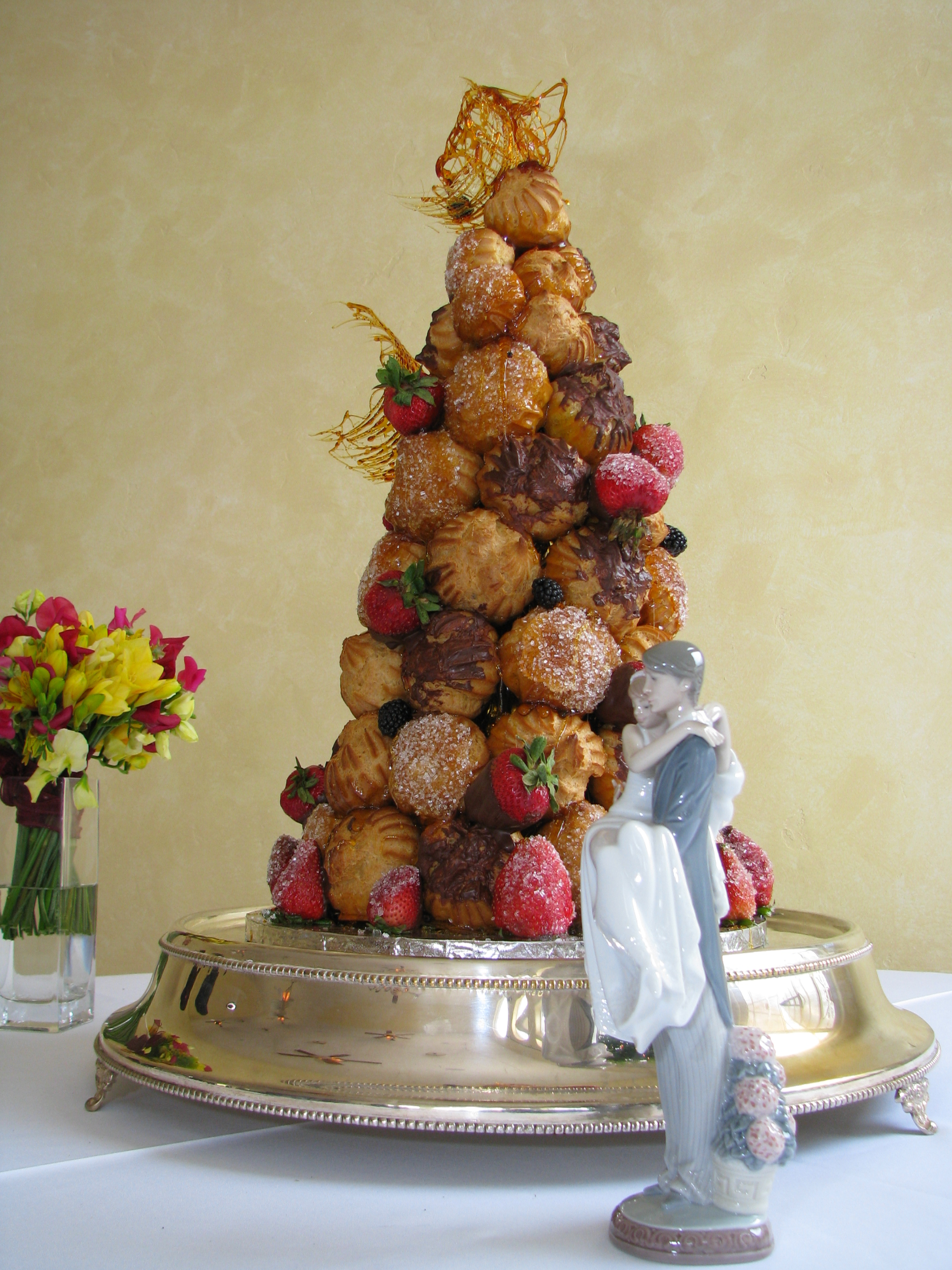
Croquembouche

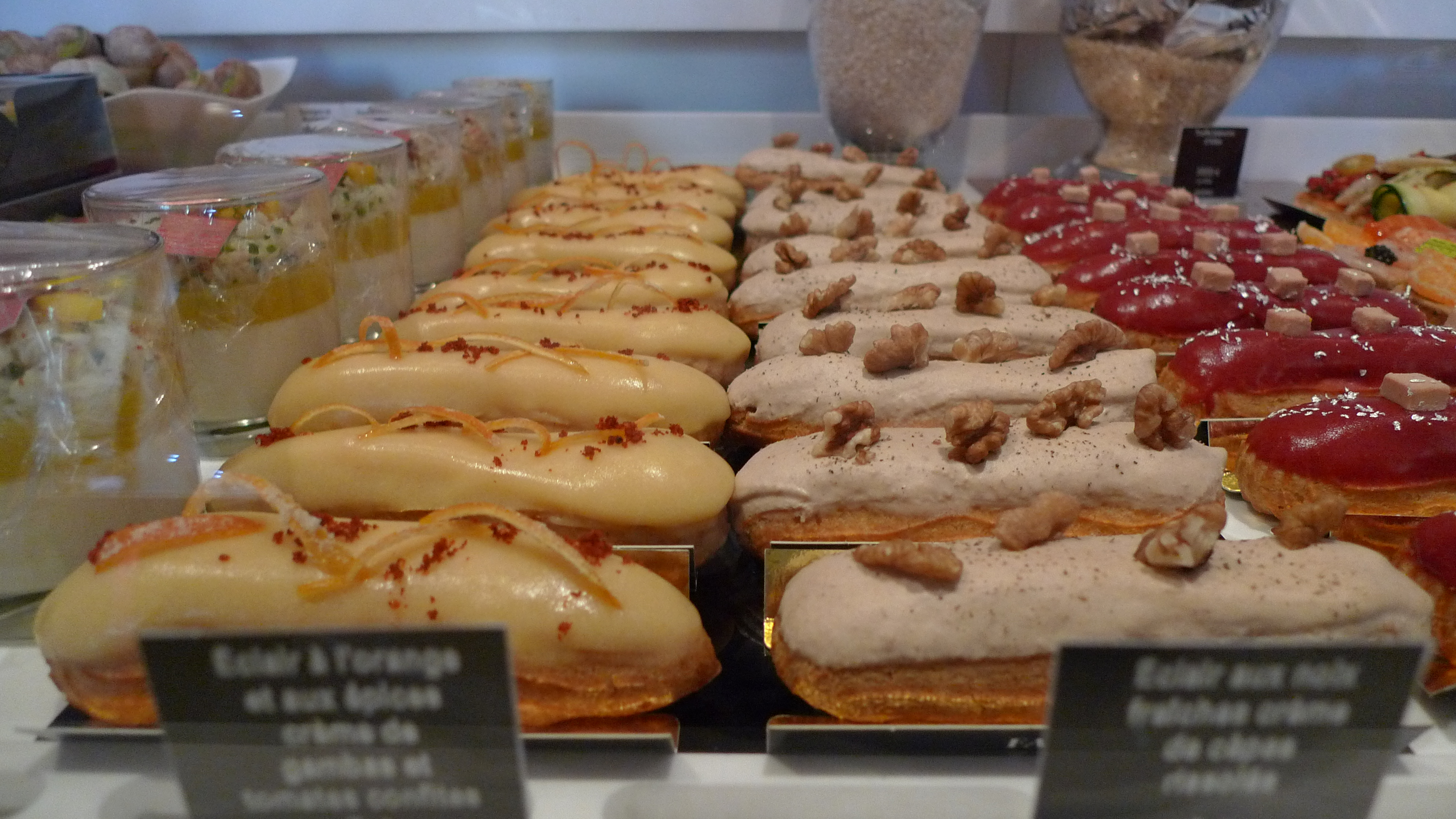
Éclairs

=== Germany ===
- Brenntar

=== Greece ===
- Bougatsa
- Diples
- Dondurma
- Finikia
- Galaktoboureko
- Koulourakia
- Loukoumades
- Melomakarono
- Moustalevria
- Nougat
- Qurabiya
- Sesame seed candy
- Spoon sweets
- Tahinopita
- Vasilopita

=== Hong Kong ===
- Egg tart
- Eggette
- Mango pomelo sago
- Put chai ko

=== Hungary ===
- Angel wings
- Apple strudel
- Buchteln
- Dobos torte
- Esterházy torte
- Fánk
- Floating island
- Gugelhupf
- Kalács
- Kürtőskalács
- Linzer torte
- Makówki
- Milk-cream strudel
- Poppy seed roll
- Rigó Jancsi
- Rum ball
- Strudel
- Vanillekipferl

=== India ===
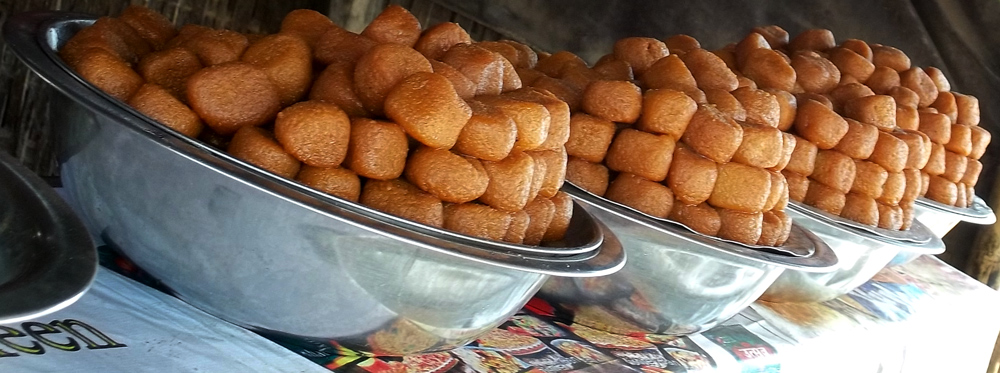
Chhena Gaja from Pahala, Orissa, India

=== Indonesia ===
- Bubur kacang hijau
- Bubur ketan hitam
- Cendol
- Corn cookie
- Es campur
- Es doger
- Es teler
- Grass jelly
- Klappertaart
- Kolak
- Lupis
- Nata de coco

=== Iran ===
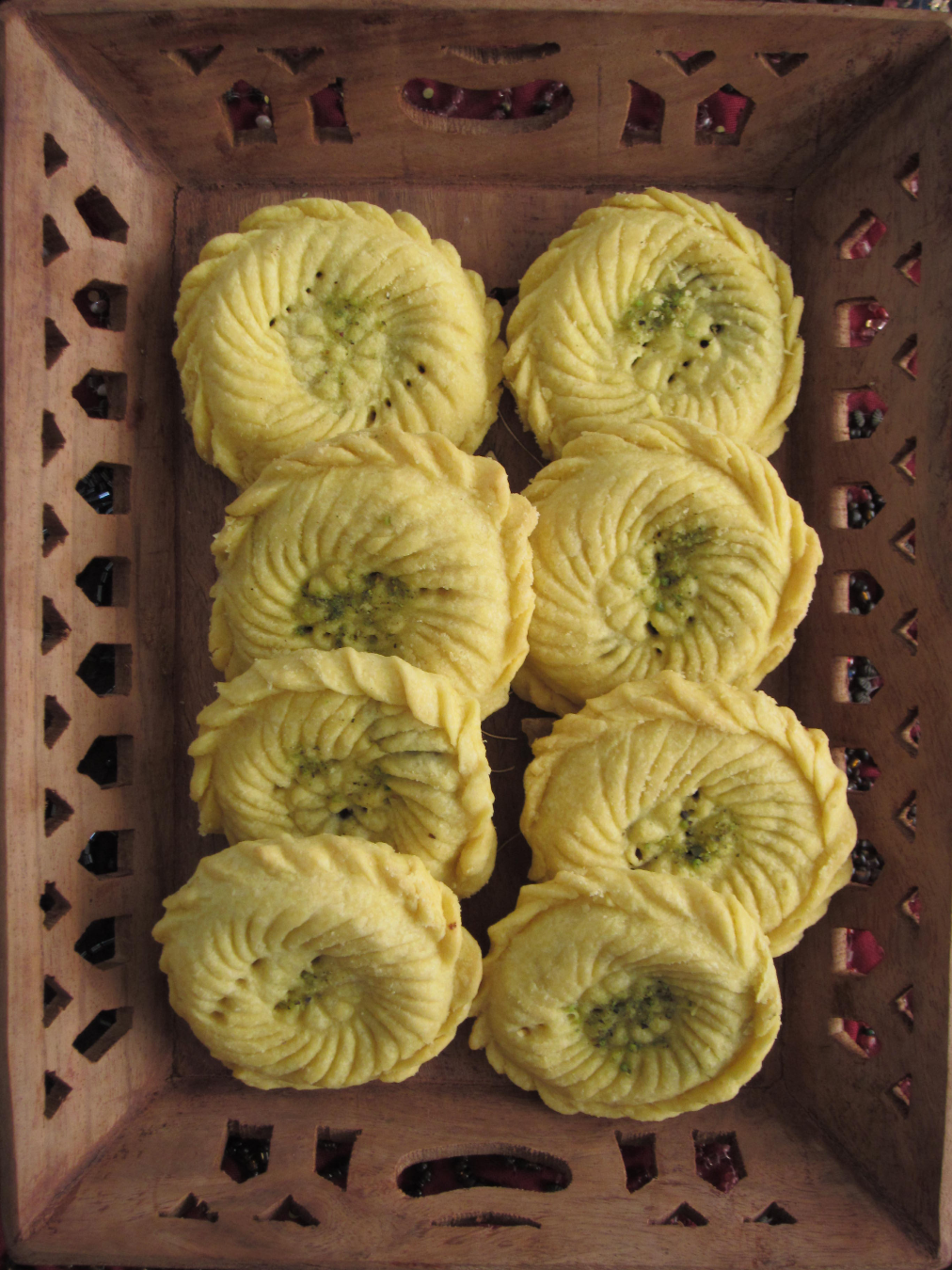
Kolompeh from Kerman, Iran

- Abnabat
- Bastani
- Faloodeh
- Gaz (candy)
- Halva
- Kolompeh
- Koloocheh
- Komaj sehen
- Noghl
- Pashmak
- Qottab
- Sholezard
- Yazdi cake

=== Italy ===
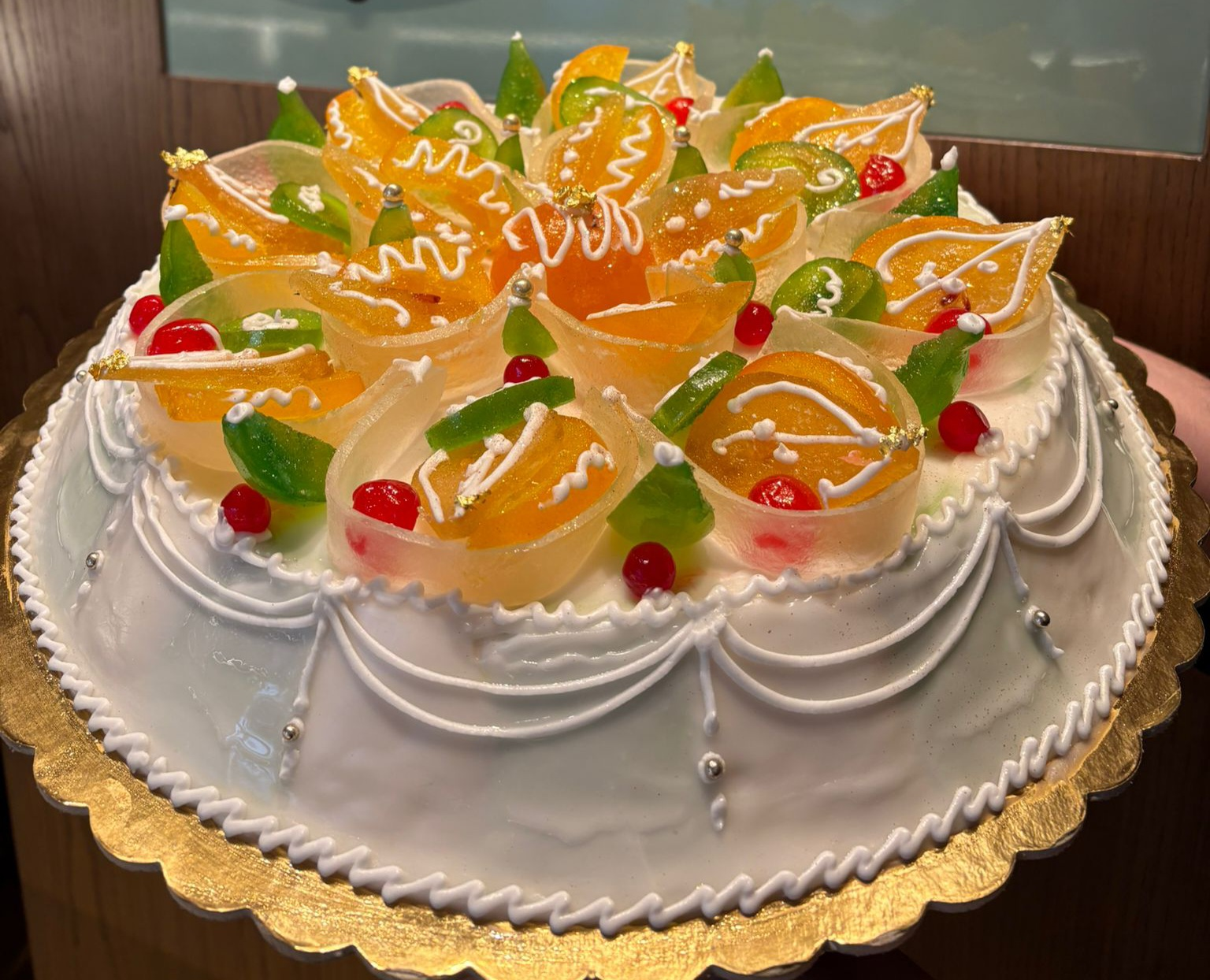
Cassatas are popular and traditional Sicilian desserts.

==== Italian pastries ====
- Baicoli
- Beignet
- Biscotti
- Biscotti Regina
- Bocconotto
- Bombolone
- Cannoli
- Ciarduna
- Crocetta di Caltanissetta
- Meringa
- Panettone
- Pandoro
- Pevarini
- Pignolata
- Pignolo
- Pizzelle
- Sfogliatelle
- Struffoli
- Torta Barozzi
- Torta caprese
- Zeppole

=== Japan ===
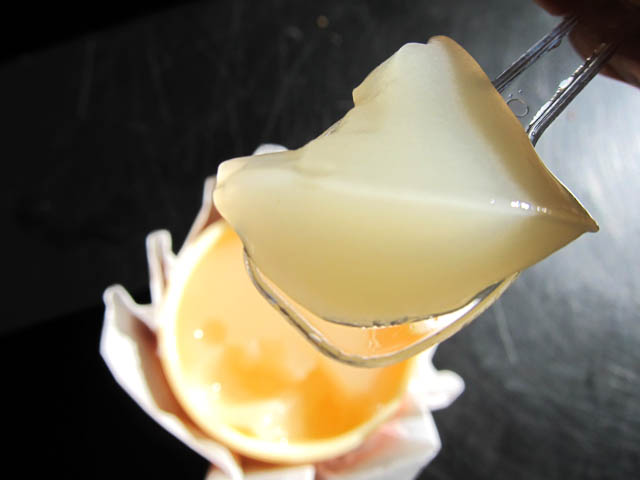
Hakuto jelly is a seasonal Japanese dessert available in the summer.

=== Luxembourg ===
- Quetschentaart
- Verwurelter

=== Malaysia ===
- Batik cake
- Bubur cha cha
- Sarawak layer cake
- Ais kacang
- Cendol
- Bubur Kacang

=== Mexico ===
- List of Mexican dishes – Desserts and sweets
- Alfajor
- Bionico
- Buñuelo
- Cajeta
- Capirotada
- Cocadas
- Coyotas
- Fried ice cream
- Manjar blanco
- Marzipan
- Nicuatole
- Paleta
- Rice pudding
- Rosca de reyes
- Tres leches cake

=== Netherlands ===
- Dutch cuisine – Desserts and puddings

=== New Zealand ===
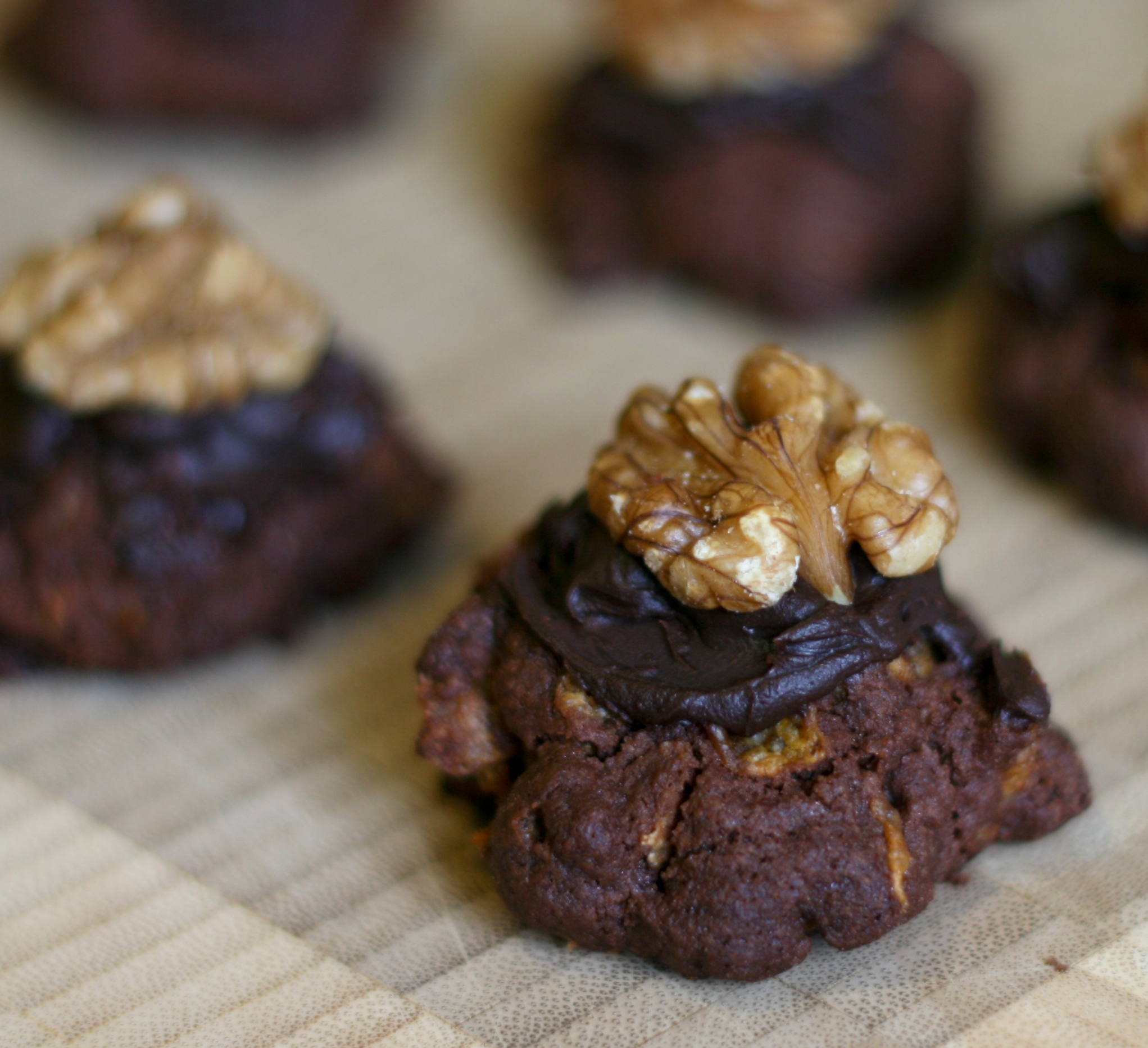
Afghan biscuits

- Afghan biscuit
- Anzac biscuit
- Fairy bread
- Hokey pokey
- Lolly cake
- Pavlova

=== Peru ===
- Picarones
- Turrón de Doña Pepa
- Suspiro a la limeña
- Mazamorra morada

=== Portugal ===
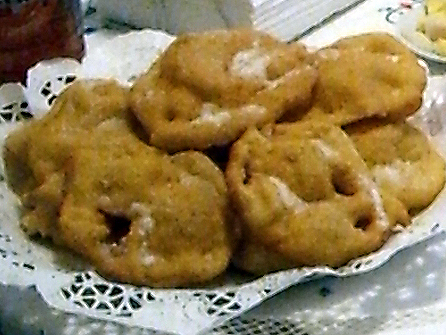
Filhos

- Aletria
- Baba de Camelo
- Bola de Berlim
- Bolo de arroz
- Bolo de mel
- Bolo Rainha
- Filhós
- Fios de ovos
- Malasada
- Natas do Céu
- Ovos Moles
- Pão de ló
- Pastel de Nata
- Queijada
- Rabanadas

=== Romania ===
- Clătită
- Colivă
- Colțunași
- Cozonac
- Griș cu lapte
- Halva
- Lapte de pasăre
- Magiun of Topoloveni
- Pască
- Rahat
- Scovardă
- Sfințișori
- Ștrudel

==== Romanian pastries ====
- Alivenci
- Amandine
- Cornulețe
- Gogoși
- Joffre cake
- Papanași
- Plăcintă

=== Russia ===
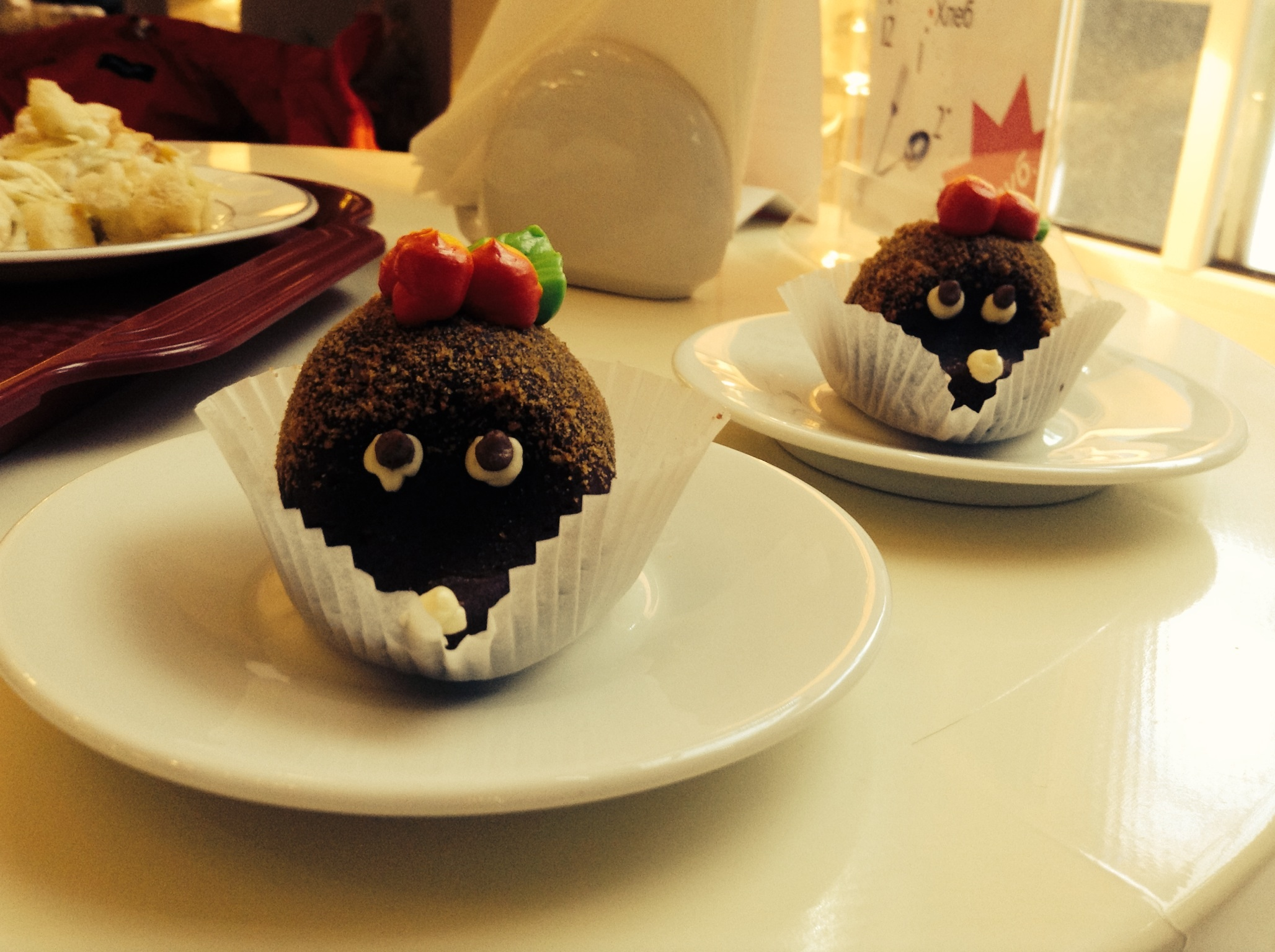
Russian kartoshka (potato) cake

- Blini
- Charlotte
- Halva
- Khvorost
- Guriev porridge
- Kogel mogel
- Napoleon
- Oladyi
- Pastila
- Ponchiki
- Ptichye moloko
- Sushki
- Syrniki
- Tula pryanik
- Varenye
- Vatrushka
- Zefir

=== Slovenia ===
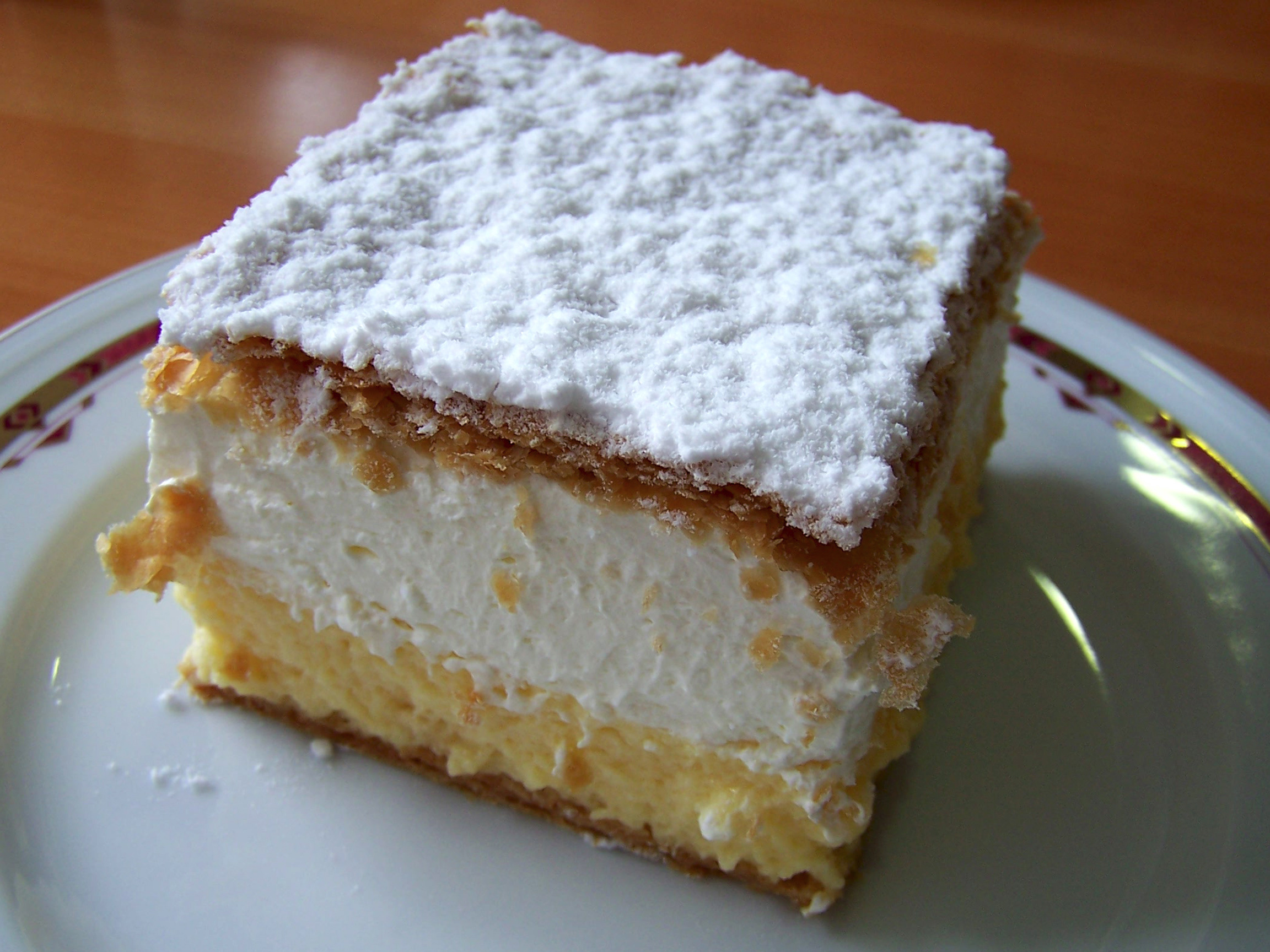
Kremna rezina

- Belokranjska povitica
- Funšterc
- Gugelhupf
- Kremna rezina
- Nut roll
- Pinca
- Prekmurska gibanica
- Strudel

=== South Africa ===
- Malva pudding

=== Spain ===
- Arroz con leche
- Casadiella
- Fartons
- Leche frita
- Pantxineta
- Sobao
- Tecula mecula
- Torrija
- Xuixo
- Yemas de Santa Teresa
- Crema catalana
- Mató de Pedralbes
- Menjablanc
- Marañuela
- Mel i mató
- Carquinyoli
- Catànies
- coques
- bunyols
- Panellet
- Tortell
- Torró
- Neules

=== Switzerland ===
==== Swiss pastries ====
- Blue cake
- Bündner Nusstorte

=== Syria ===
- Barazek
- Halawet el Jibn
- Knafeh
- Qatayef
- Rice pudding

=== Taiwan ===
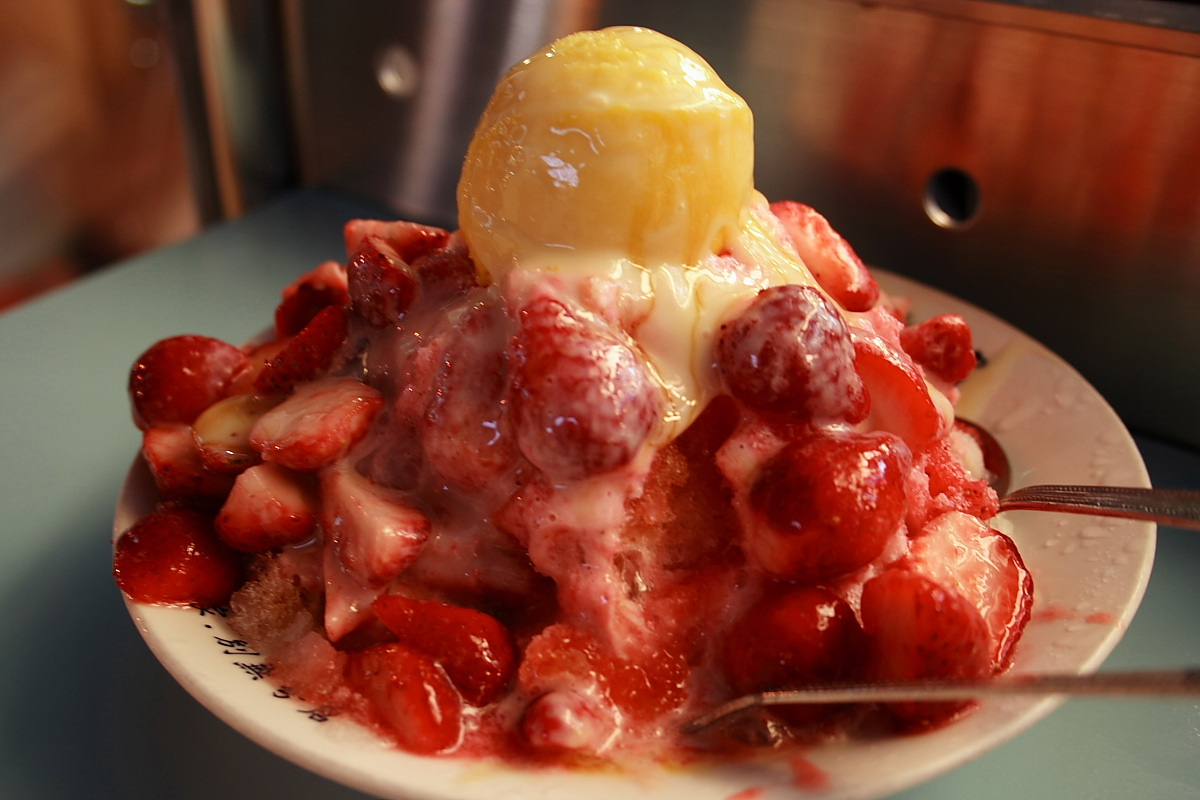
A plate of Bàobīng with strawberries and condensed milk

- Apple bread
- Aiyu jelly
- Belly button pastry
- Bubble tea
- Communist bandit pastry
- Egg yolk pastry
- Ji dan gao
- Kiâm-piánn
- Le̍k-tāu-phòng
- Mango shaved ice
- Naiyou subing
- Ngiu vun sui
- Peanut ice cream roll
- Pineapple cake
- QQ egg
- Scallion bread
- Shuangbaotai
- Square cookie
- Suncake
- Taro ball
- Taro pastry
- Taro shaved ice
- Tshuah-ping
- Wheel Pie

=== Thailand ===
- Cendol
- Coconut custard
- Foi thong
- Grass jelly
- Khanom krok
- Khanom bueang
- Khanom chan
- Khanom thuai
- Khao tom
- Kluay buat chee
- Mango sticky rice
- Namtan pan
- Thong yip
- Tub tim krob

=== Turkey ===
==== Turkish pastries ====
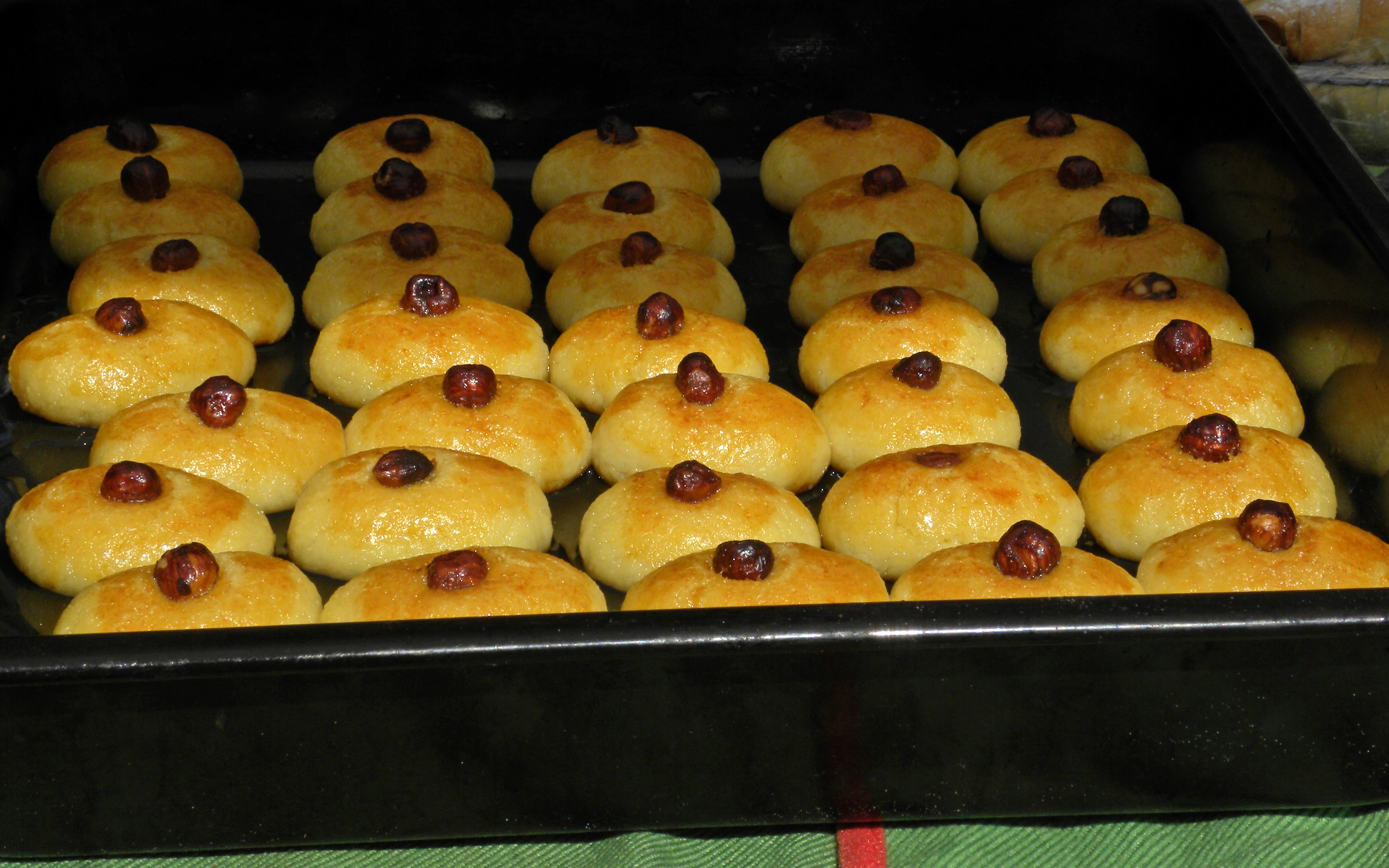
Şekerpare

- Baklava
- Bülbül yuvası
- Cezerye
- Ekmek kadayıfı
- Güllaç
- Kalburabastı
- Künefe
- Kurabiye
- Lady's navel
- Lokma
- Revani
- Sambali (Basbousa)
- Saray helva
- Şekerpare
- Sütlü Nuriye
- Tulumba

=== Ukraine ===
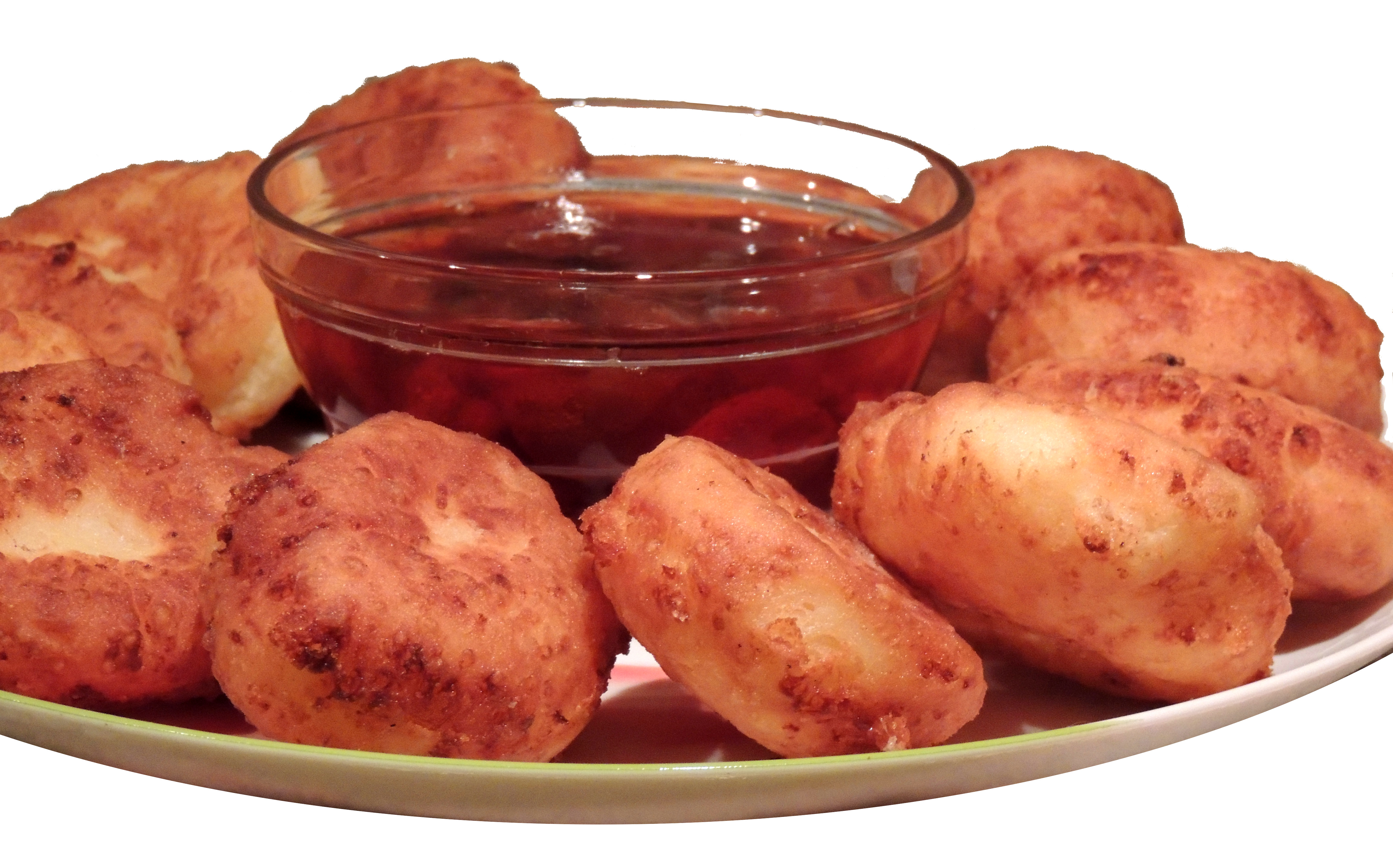
Syrnyky with jam

- Babka
- Mlyntsi
- Bublyk
- Kutia
- Kyiv cake
- Kysil
- Lviv syrnyk
- Mandryky
- Medivnyk (honey cake)
- Molozyvo
- Napoleon
- Oladky
- Pampushky
- Paska
- Pinnyk
- Pliatsky
- Prianyk
- Ptashyne moloko
- Pyrih
- Smetannyk
- Sushky
- Syrnyky
- Varennia
- Varenyky
- Vatrushka
- Vypichka
- Verhuny
- Yabchanka
- Zefir
- Zhele

=== United Arab Emirates ===
- Khabees

=== United Kingdom ===
==== Scotland ====
- Abernethy biscuit
- Black bun
- Clootie dumpling
- Cranachan
- Deep-fried Mars bar
- Dundee cake
- Empire biscuit
- Fudge doughnut
- Penguin
- Tipsy Laird

=== Uruguay ===
- Berliner

=== Vietnam ===
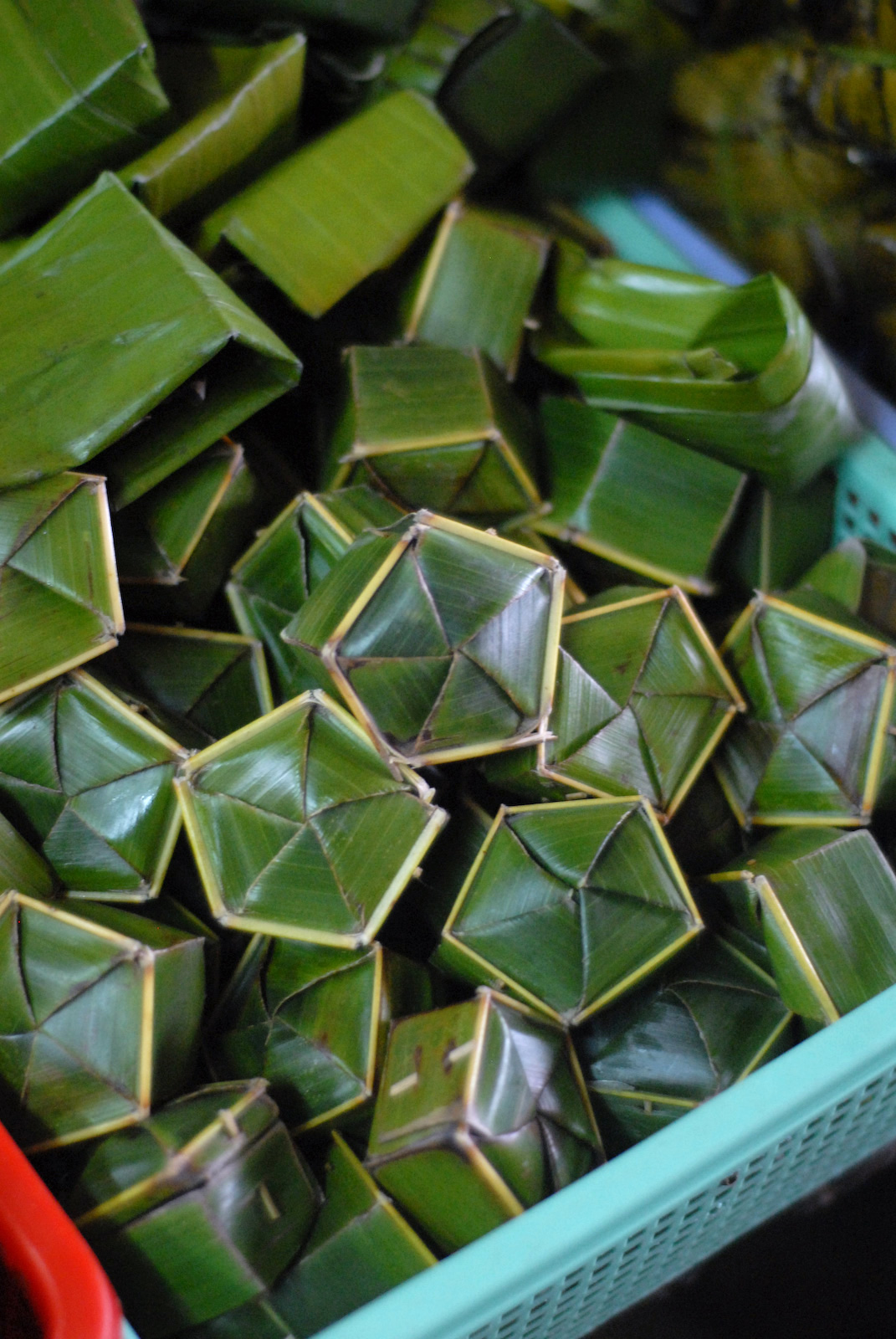
Bánh phu thê, wrapped in palm leaves

- Bánh bao bánh vạc
- Bánh bò
- Bánh chuối
- Bánh da lợn
- Bánh gối
- Bánh in
- Bánh lá / Bánh tẻ
- Bánh phu thê
- Bánh pía
- Bánh rán
- Chè
- Chè trôi nước
- Cơm rượu
- Mango sticky rice

== By region ==
=== Indian Subcontinent ===
Sweets from the Indian subcontinent
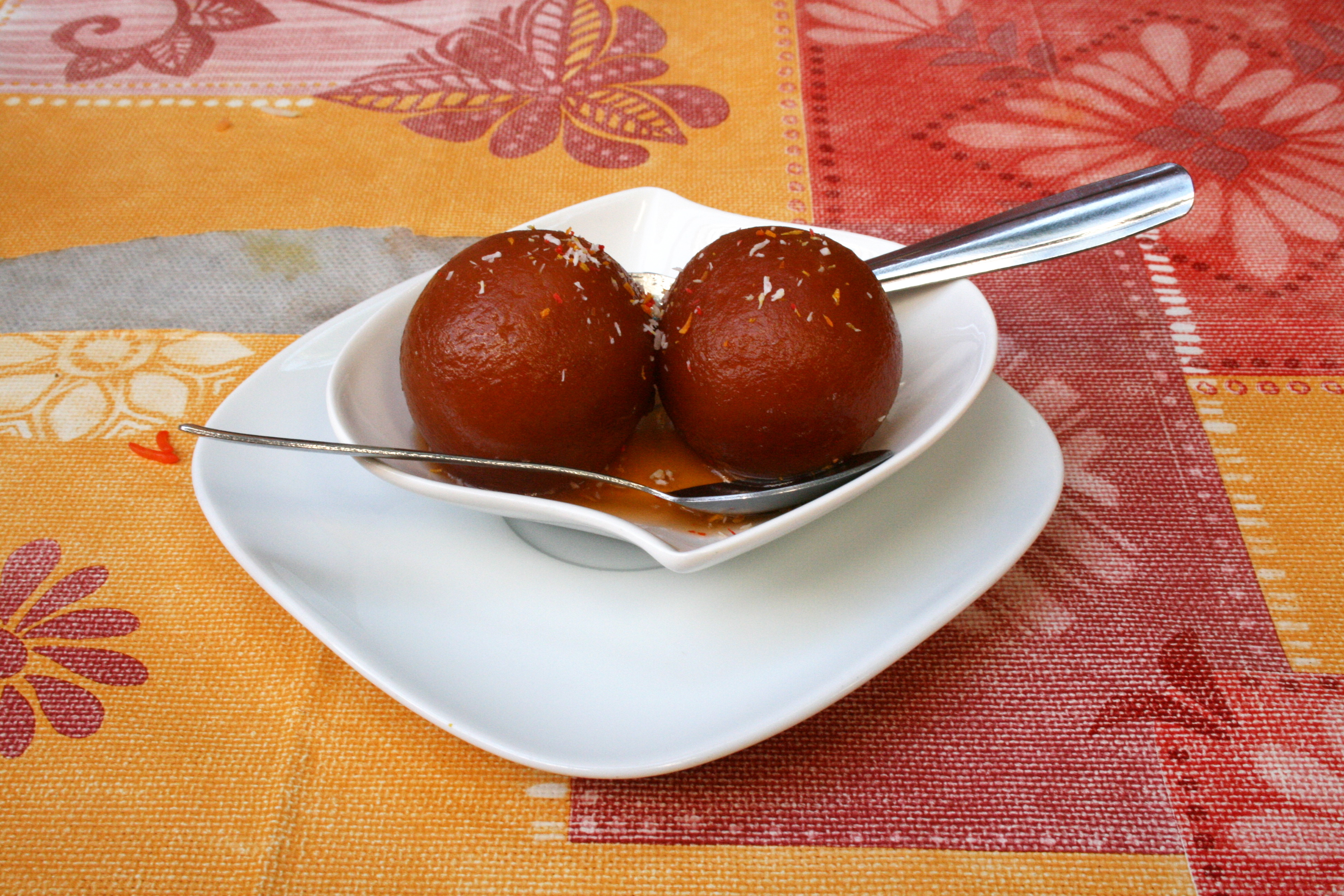
Gulab jamun

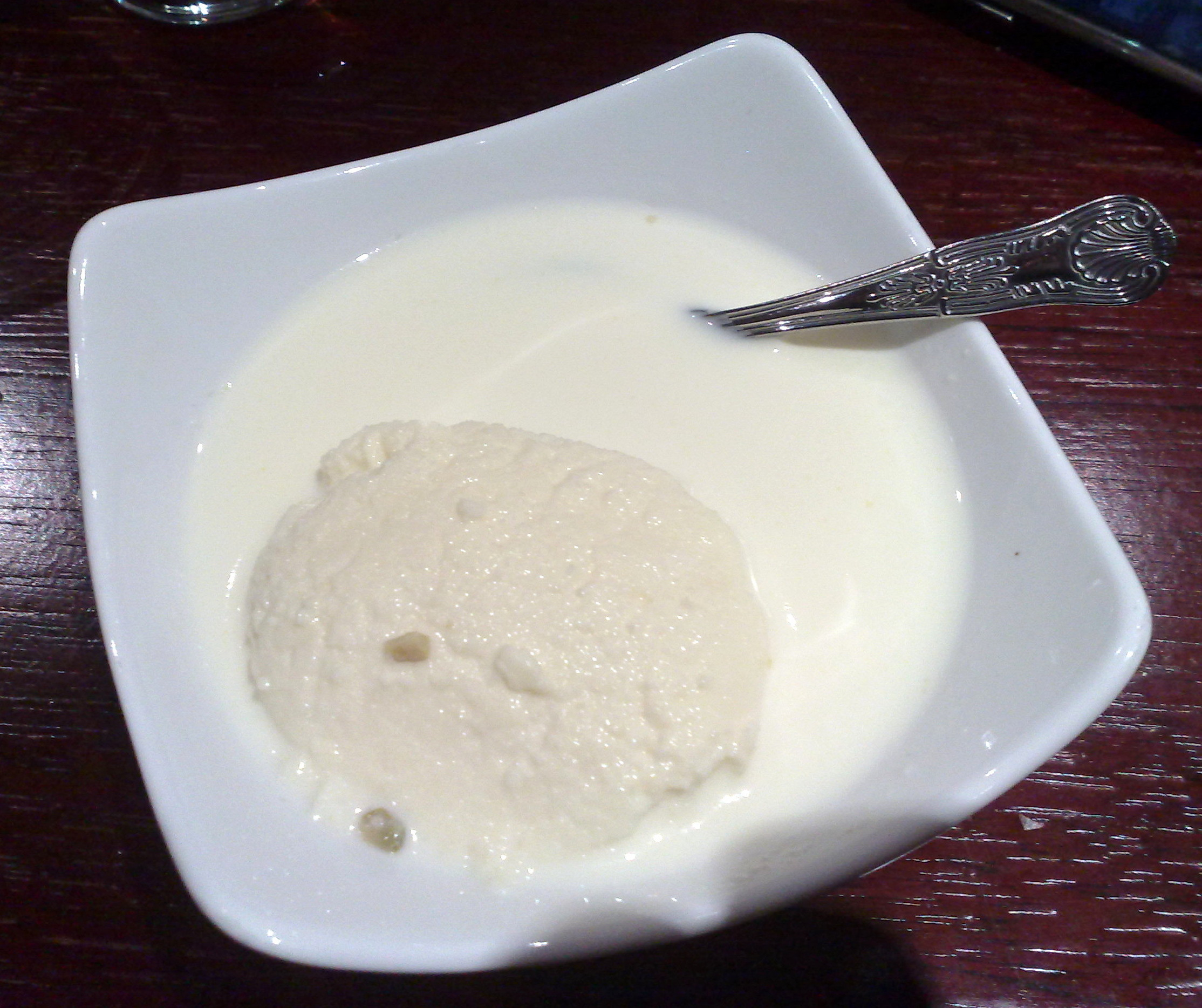
Rasmalai

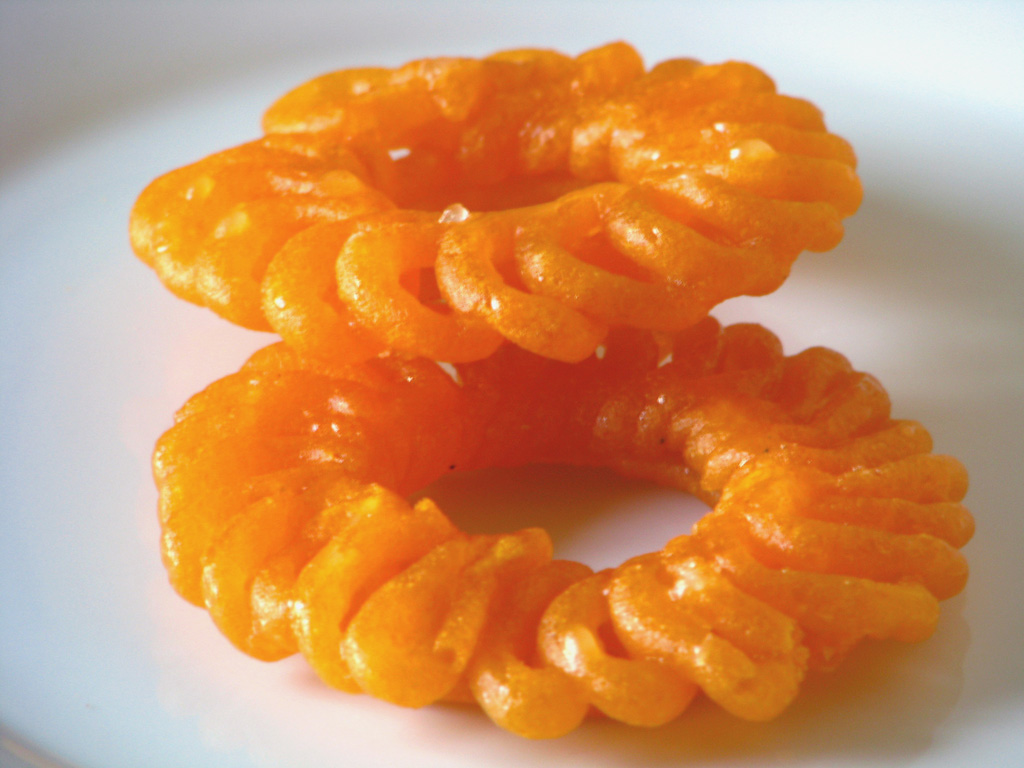
Jalebi

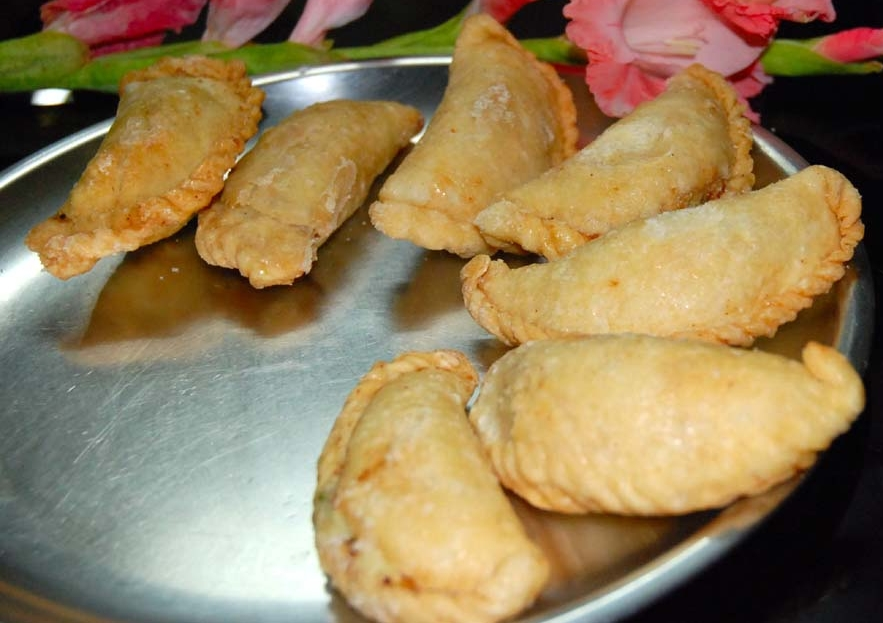
Gujiya

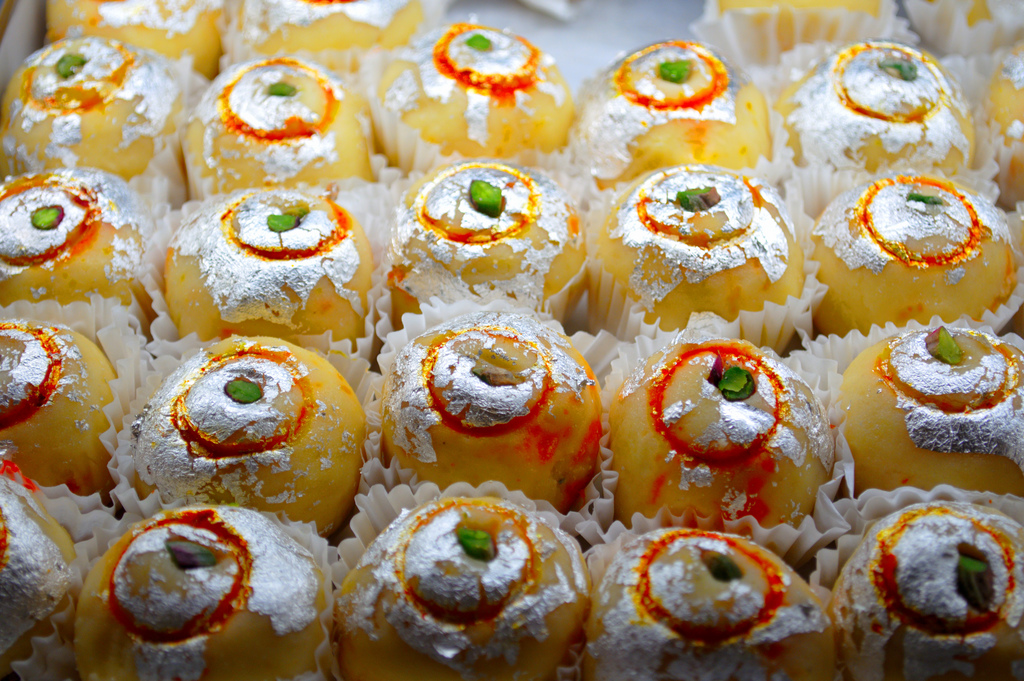
Khoya sweets with varaq

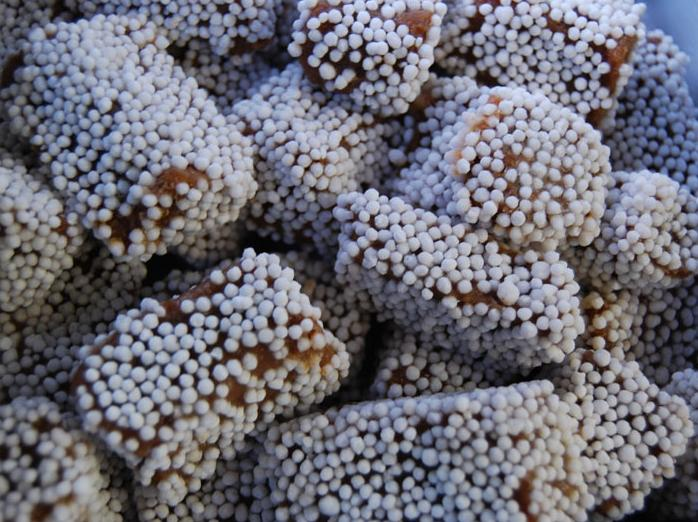
Bal mithai

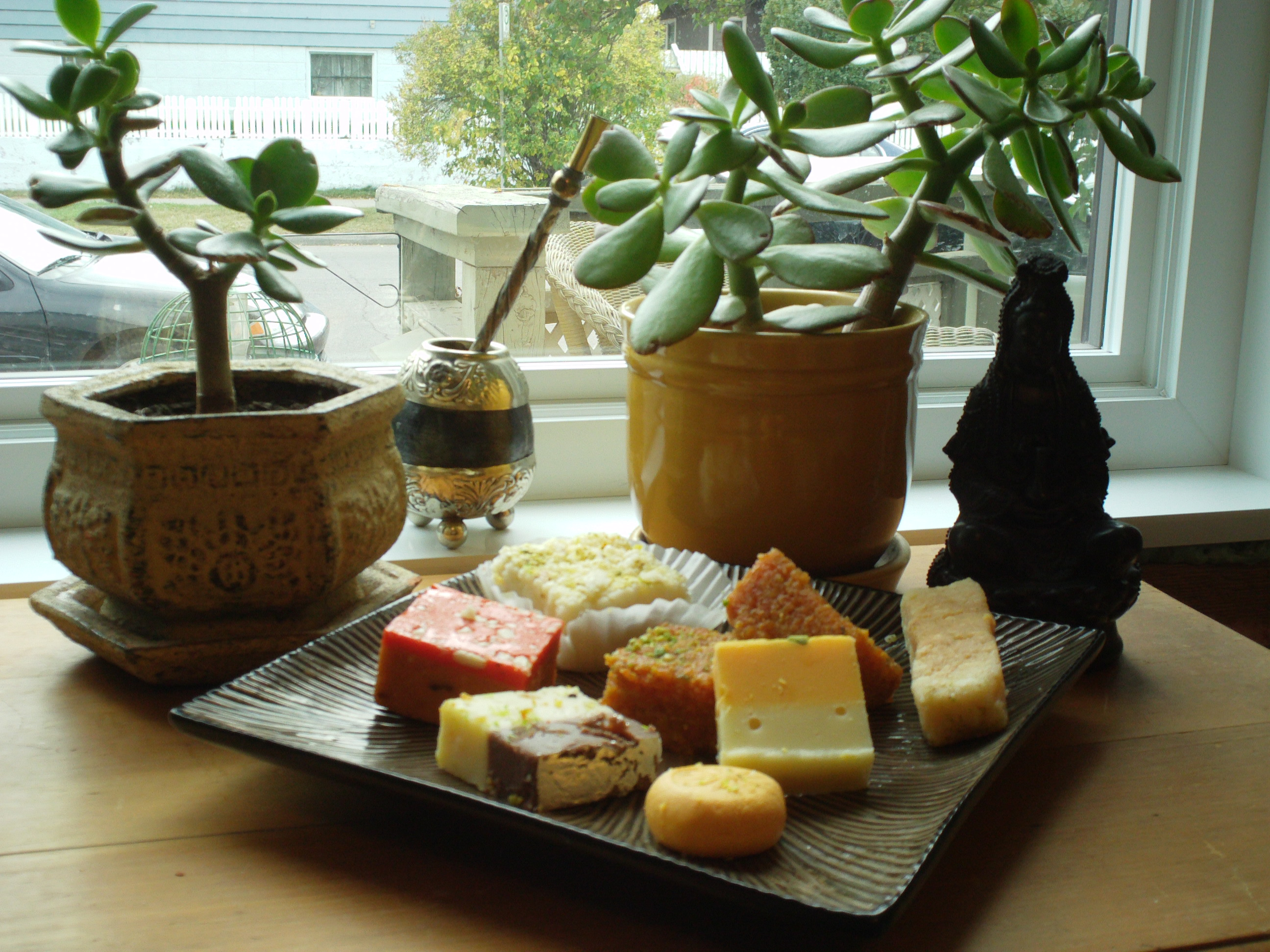
Khoa and almond mithais

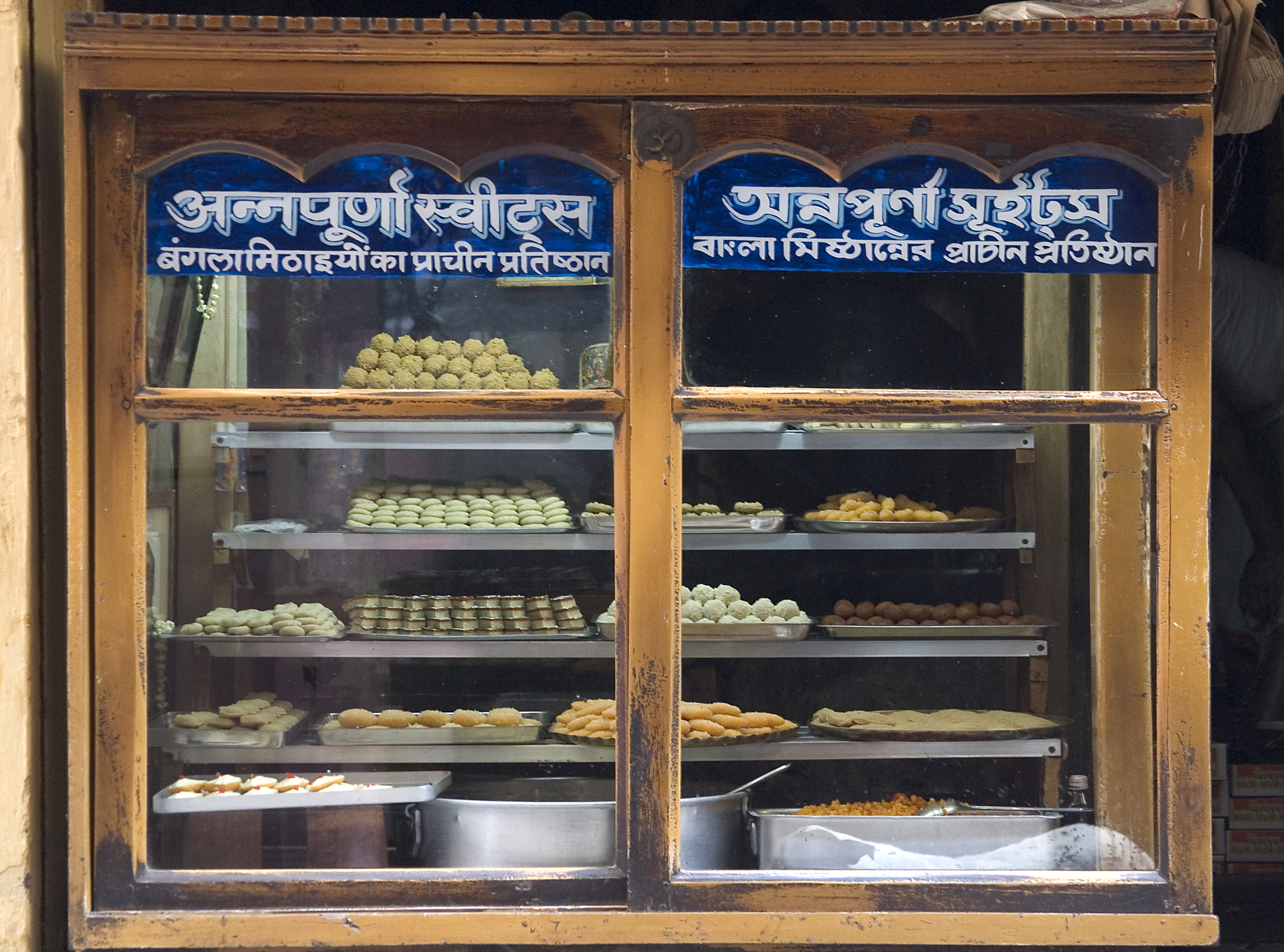
Bengal sweets in India

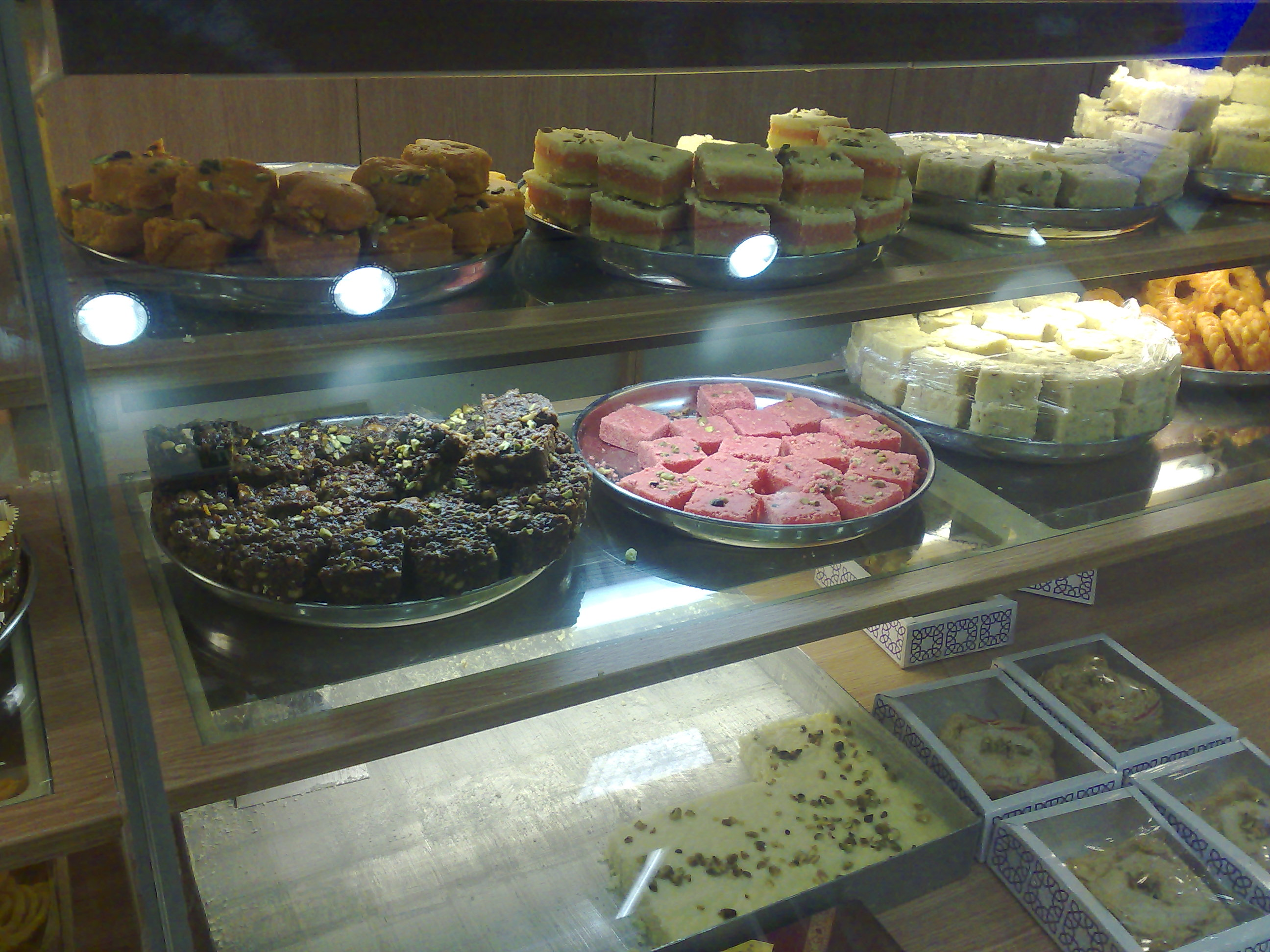
Collection in UK

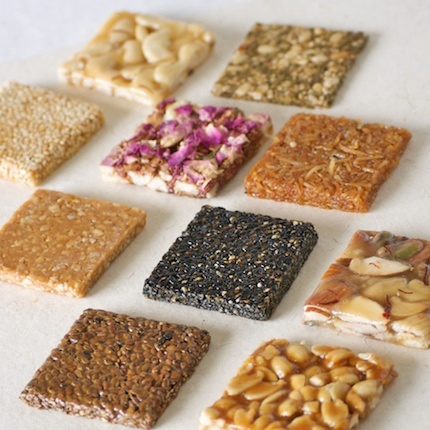
Chikki

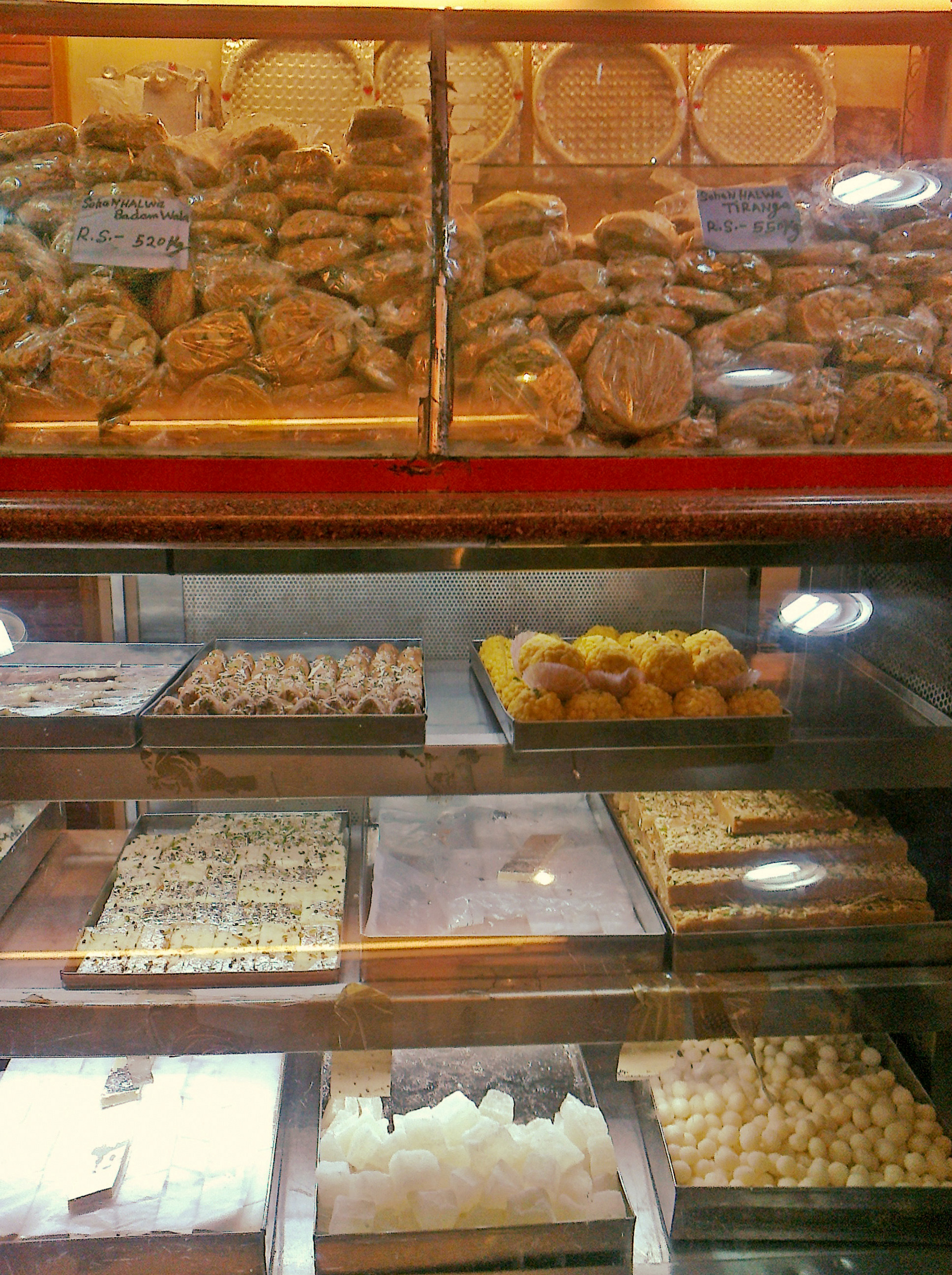
Sohan sweets in India

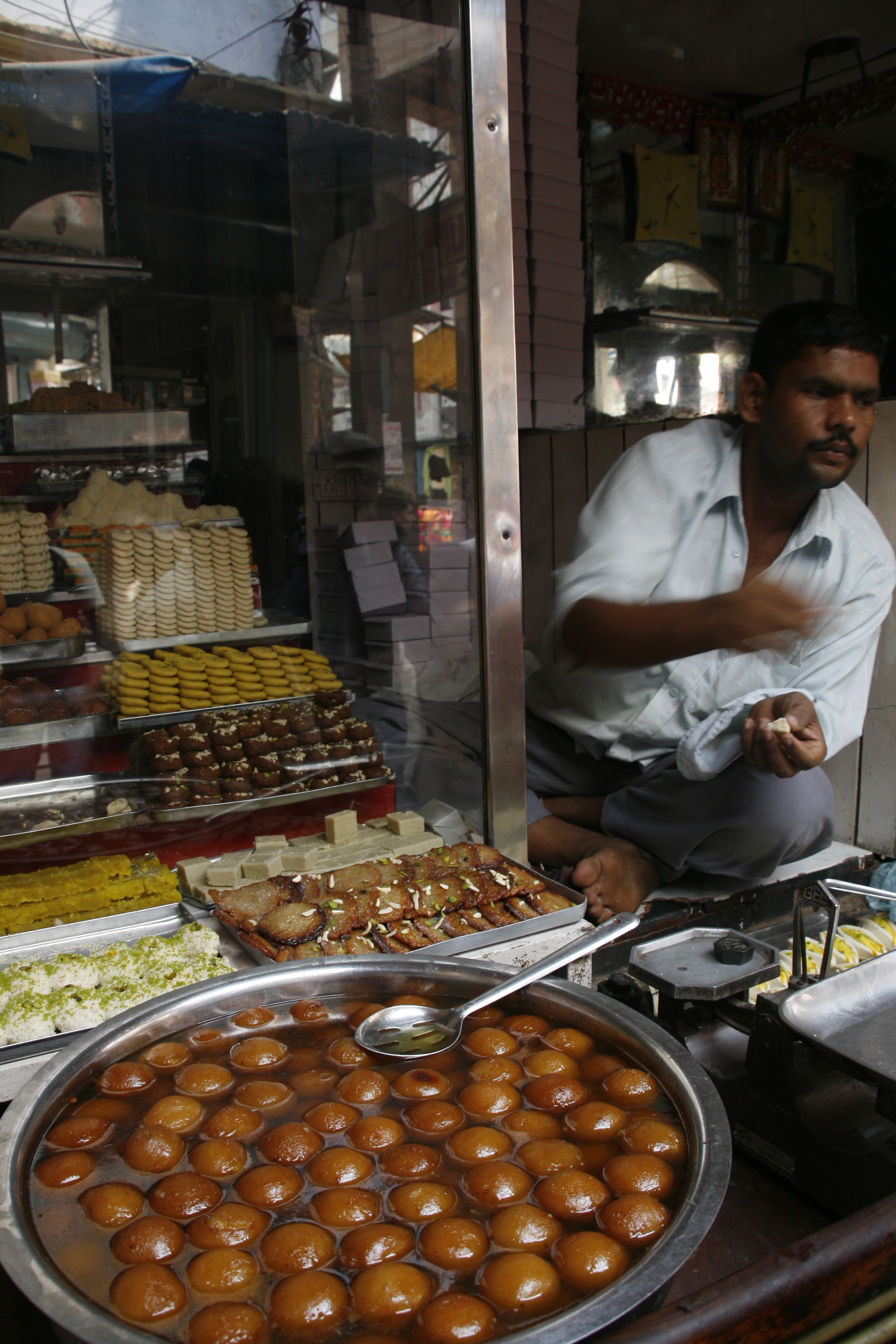
Street sweets in India
- A sample of sweets from the Indian subcontinent

==== Bengal ====
- Bengali cuisine – desserts

=== Latin America ===
Latin America is a highly diverse area with cuisines that vary from nation to nation. Desserts in Latin American cuisine include, rice pudding, tres leches cake, teja and flan.

=== Polynesia ===
- Po'e
- Poi

=== Southern Africa ===
In Southern Africa, desserts may simply be fruit, but there are some western style puddings, such as the Angolan cocada amarela, which was inspired by Portuguese cuisine.

== By time period ==
=== Middle Ages ===
- Medieval cuisine – sweets and desserts

== See also ==
- Cuisine
- Culinary arts
- Dessert-related lists (category)
- List of bean-to-bar chocolate manufacturers
- List of breads
- List of custard desserts
- List of dessert sauces
- List of ice cream flavors
- Pastry
- List of pastries
