= List of Taiwanese desserts and snacks =

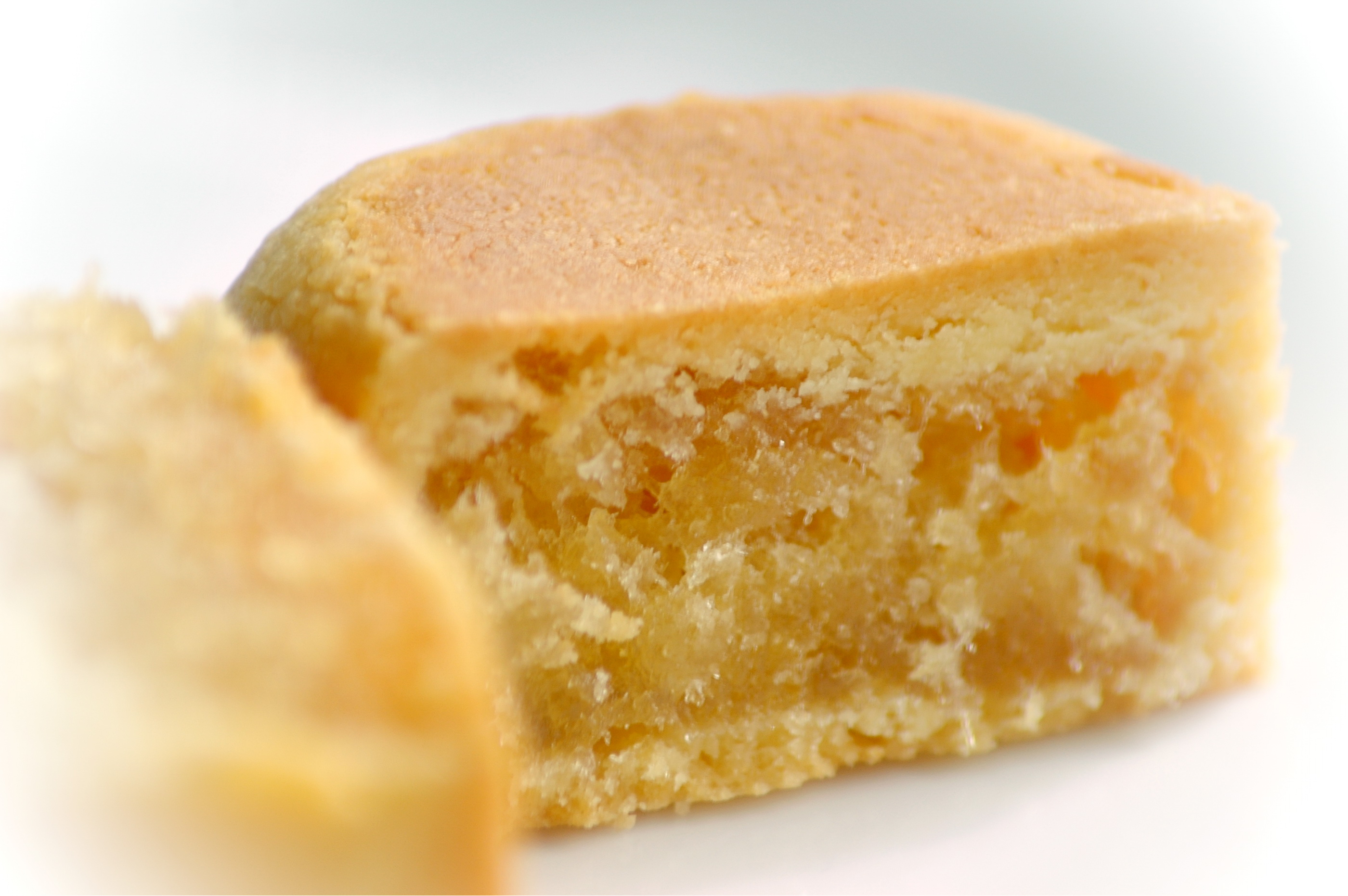
Pineapple cake

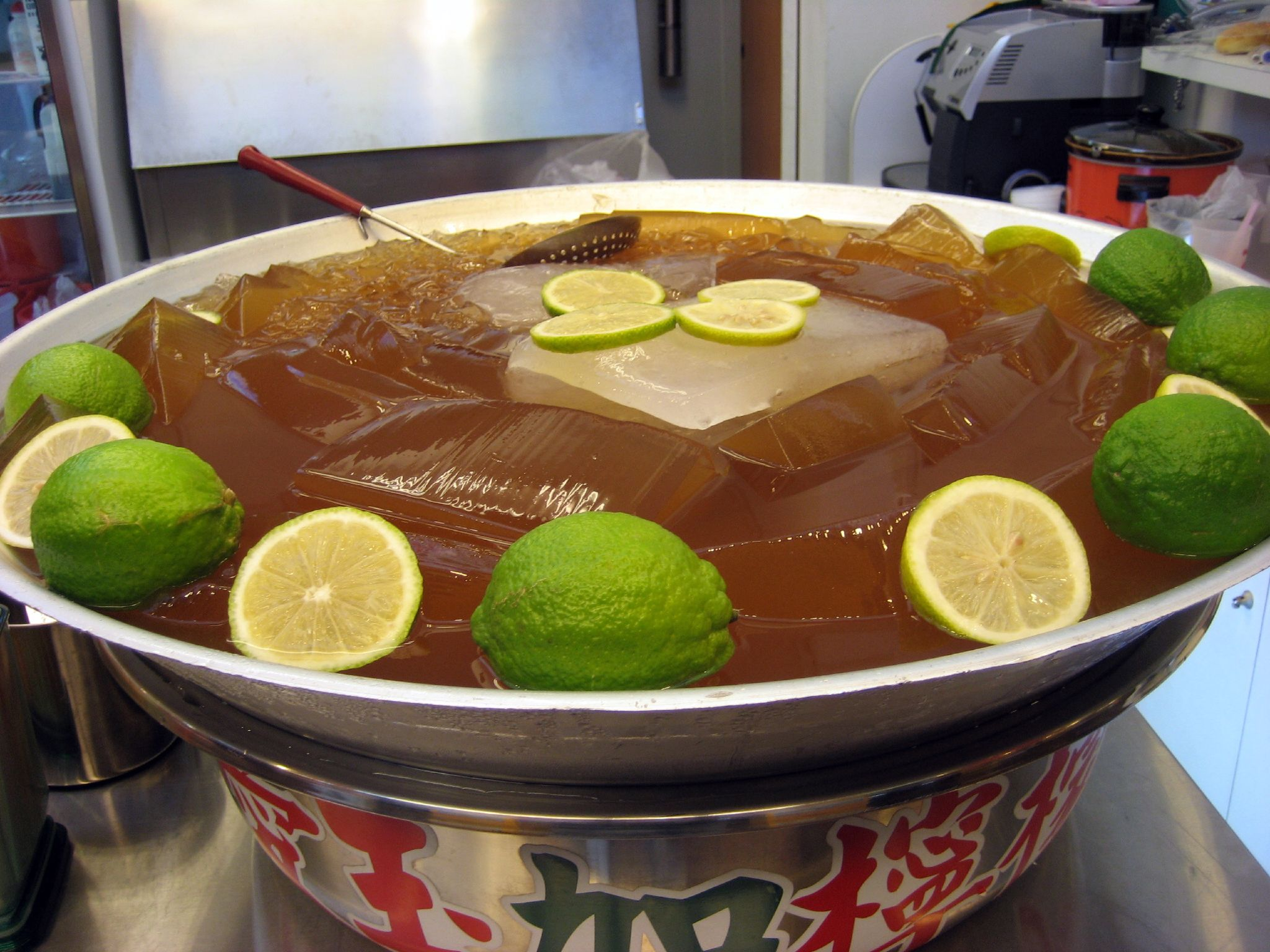
Aiyu jelly

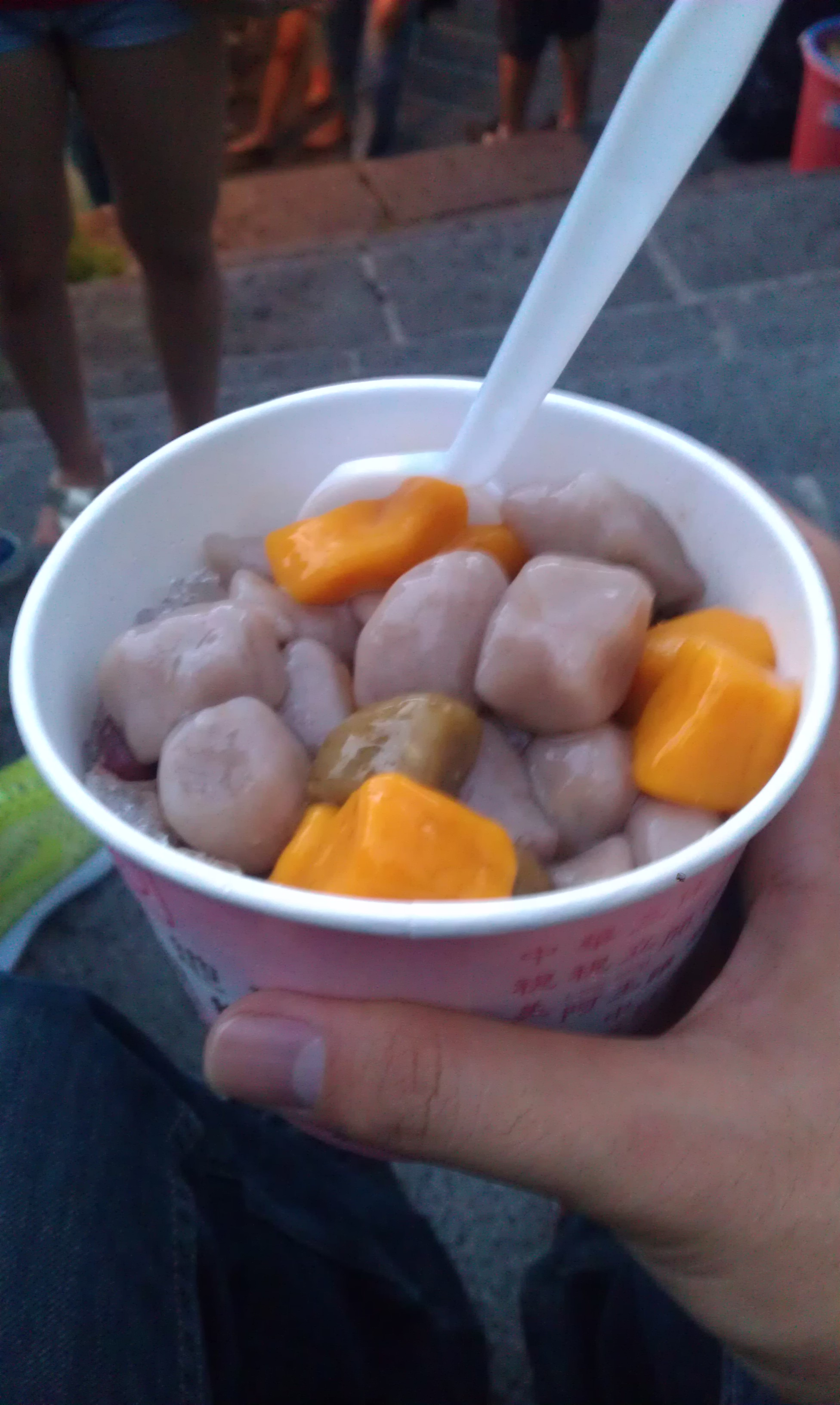
Taro ball

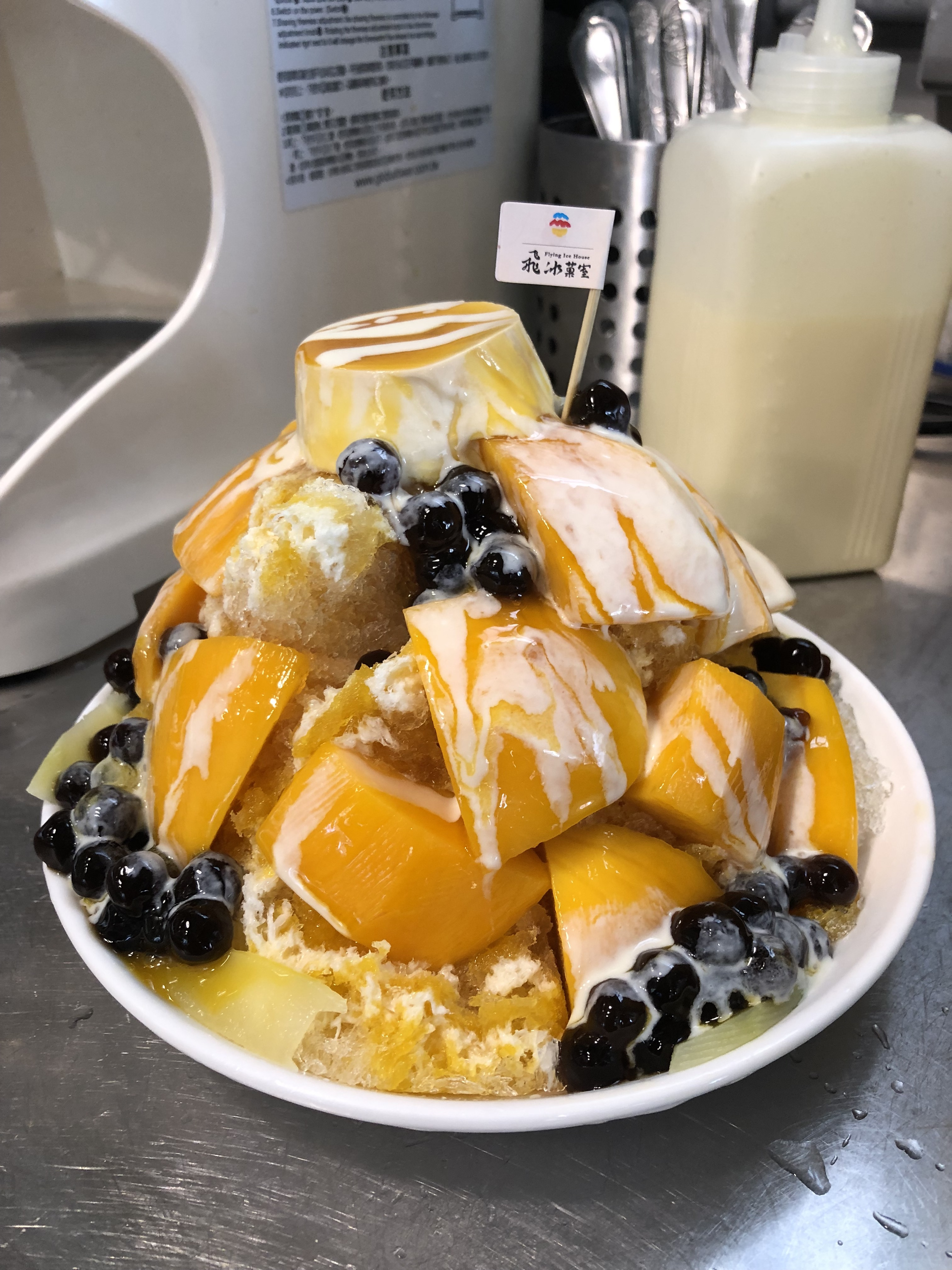
Tshuah-ping

This is a list of notable Taiwanese desserts and snacks. Some of these dishes are also a part of other cuisines.

== Taiwanese desserts and snacks ==
- Aiyu jelly – Jelly popular in Taiwan and Singapore
- Apple bread – Taiwanese aromatic bread
- Bakkwa – Salty-sweet dried meat product
- Belly button pastry – Traditional Hakka pastry from Miaoli, Taiwan
- Brown sugar cake
- Cactus ice
- Chhau-a-koe – Glutinous rice dumplings colored green with herbs
- Coconut bar – Chilled, gelatinous dessert made from coconut milk
- Concave cake – Type of confectionery
- Douhua – Chinese dessert made with tender tofu
- Dried shredded squid – Seafood product
- Egg yolk pastry – Taiwanese mooncake pastry filled with salted duck egg yolk and red bean paste
- Grass jelly – Asian jelly-like dessert
- Ji dan gao – Taiwanese sponge cake
- Kiâm-nn̄g-ko – Taiwanese savory sponge cake from Fengyuan, Taichung
- Kiâm-piánn – Taiwanese salty biscuit
- Kuai Kuai – Food company
- Lek-tau-phong – Taiwanese mung bean minced meat mooncake pastry
- Mango shaved ice – Taiwanese shaved ice dessert with mango topping
- Mochi – Japanese rice cake
- Naiyou subing – Taiwanese buttery, flaky pastry made into a thin circle
- Ngiu vun sui
- Peanut soup – Soup made from peanuts
- Peanut ice cream roll – Taiwanese ice cream burrito
- Pineapple cake – Taiwanese sweet pastry
- QQ egg – Taiwanese fried sweet potato snack
- Scallion bread – Taiwanese green onion bread
- Shuangbaotai – Taiwanese crispy, deep-fried dough of Hokchew origin
- Square cookie – Taiwanese cookie originated from Chiayi
- Suncake – Taiwanese flaky cakes filled with maltose
- Taro ball – Traditional Taiwanese dessert made of taro
- Taro pastry – Taiwanese buttery, flaky pastry with taro fillings
- Taro shaved ice – Taiwanese frozen dessert
- Tshuah-ping – Shaved ice dessert
- Wheel Pie – Taiwanese pastry dessert
- Youtiao – Deep-fried pastry of Chinese origin

== See also ==
- List of desserts
- Taiwanese cuisine
- List of Taiwanese inventions and discoveries
