= Belly button pastry =

Traditional Hakka pastry from Miaoli, Taiwan

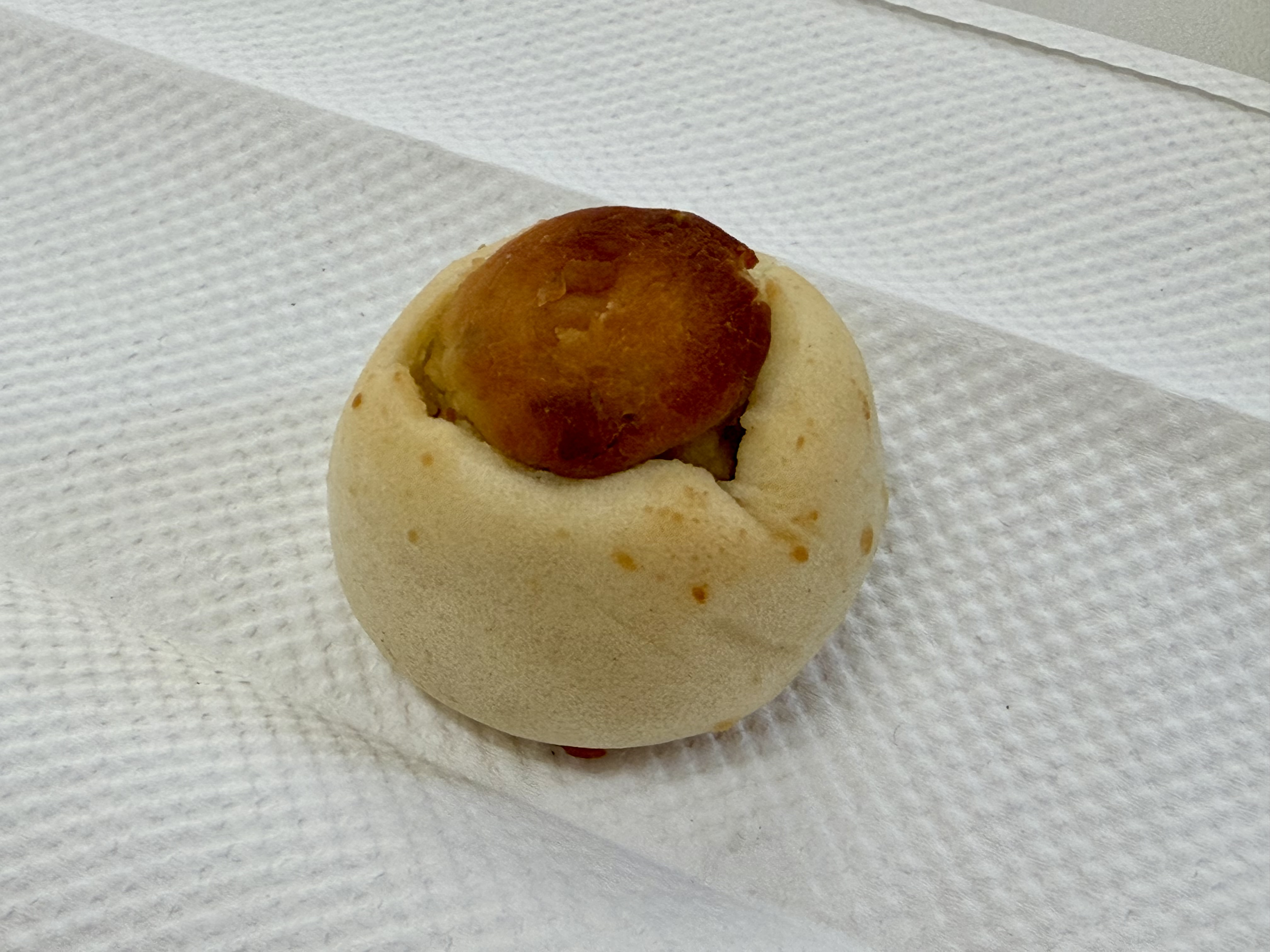
- Alternative names: Tōo-tsâi-piánn, navel cake, mung bean cake
- Type: Pastry
- Place of origin: Taiwan
- Region or state: Miaoli County
- Serving temperature: Cold
- Main ingredients: Mung bean paste, sweet potato, flour

Belly button pastry
- Traditional Chinese: 肚臍餅
Transcriptions
Standard Mandarin
- Tongyong Pinyin: Dùcíbǐng
Southern Min
- Tâi-lô: Tōo-tsâi-piánn

Belly button pastry (Chinese: 肚臍餅; Tongyong Pinyin: Dùcíbǐng; Tâi-lô: Tōo-tsâi-piánn) is a traditional pastry associated with the Hakka communities of Miaoli County, Taiwan. Occasionally, it is called moonlight cake (月光餅), nipple cake (奶頭餅), pacifier cake (奶嘴餅), mung bean cake (綠豆餅), and mung bean puff (綠豆凸).

There are contradictory accounts of how it originated. In one account, when Taiwan under Japanese rule, the Hakka served the pastry to important visitors by relying on local ingredients. In a second story, during that same era, the Miaoli Sugar Factory's workers relied on locally sourced ingredients to create an imitation of Japanese sweets. A third account held that the pastry's shape took inspiration from sweet potato that had been molded into an infant's pacifier. A fourth account said that it came from a mung bean puff that in which the crust ruptured and was breached by the filling.

== See also ==
- List of Taiwanese desserts
- List of desserts
- Lek-tau-phong
- Hakka cuisine
- Egg yolk pastry
- Taro pastry
