= Square cookie =

Taiwanese cookie originated from Chiayi

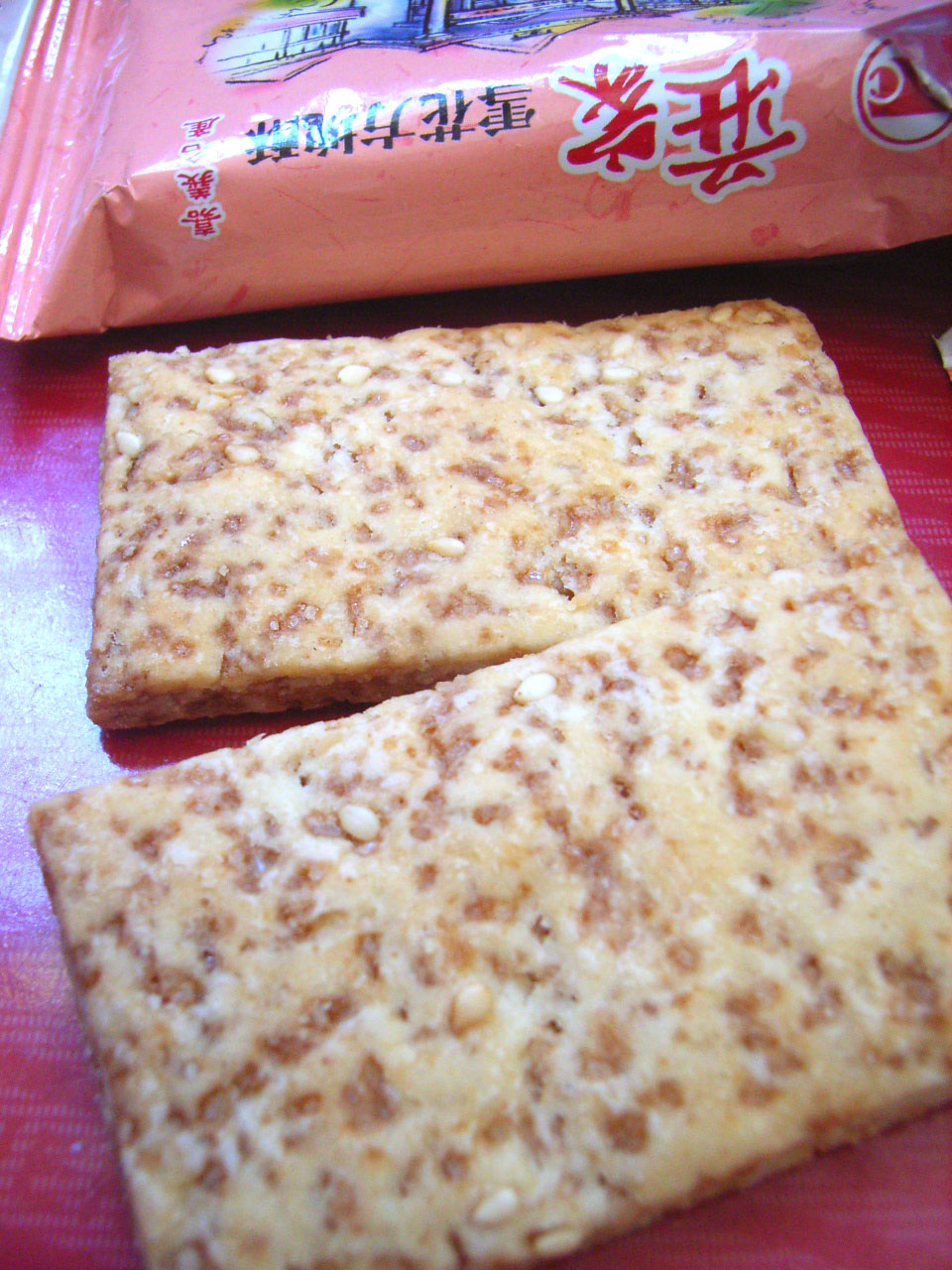
- Alternative names: Fangkuaisu, Cubic cracker
- Place of origin: Taiwan
- Region or state: Chiayi
- Created by: Tang Chang-fa
- Main ingredients: flour, water, sugar, salt, sesame seeds, milk powder, lard

Square cookie
- Traditional Chinese: 方塊酥
Transcriptions
Standard Mandarin
- Hanyu Pinyin: Fāngkùaisū
Southern Min
- Hokkien POJ: hong-tè-so̍

Square cookie, (Chinese: 方塊酥; pinyin: fāngkùaisū; Pe̍h-ōe-jī: hong-tè-so̍), is a traditional Taiwanese cookie, originating from Chiayi County.

== History ==
The famous cookie were first crafted by Tang Chang-fa in 1956. Tang, a retired military officer who retreated from China to Taiwan with the Kuomintang in 1949, innovatively combined the method of making northern Chinese flatbread with traditional Taiwanese pastry techniques, modifying the shape to a square for better packaging and convenience. These cookies have since become emblematic of Chiayi's culinary heritage, frequently chosen as souvenirs and included in prestigious lists such as Taiwan's top 100 souvenirs and state banquet desserts.

== Ingredients and Preparation ==
The primary ingredients for square cookies include baked milk powder, butter or lard, sesame seeds, and sugar. The preparation involves mixing low-gluten flour with these ingredients to form a dough, which is then divided into small portions. Separately, medium-gluten flour is kneaded to create the outer layer. Each portion of the filling is wrapped in the outer layer, flattened, folded multiple times, and then baked until crispy. The resulting texture and flavor, characterized by the rich taste of butter and sesame, are what make these cookies particularly appealing.

== Variations ==
Square cookies are a staple in Chiayi, often considered the best in the region. En Dian Square Cookies, established in 1945, is a well-known local bakery that specializes in these cookies, boasting a delicate 243-layered crispy texture. The cookies come in various flavours, including original, honey, chocolate, and seaweed. They are also a popular choice for souvenirs and are included in gift packages for tourists.

== See also ==
- List of Taiwanese desserts
- List of desserts
- Kiâm-piánn
