= Kiâm-piánn =

Taiwanese salty biscuit

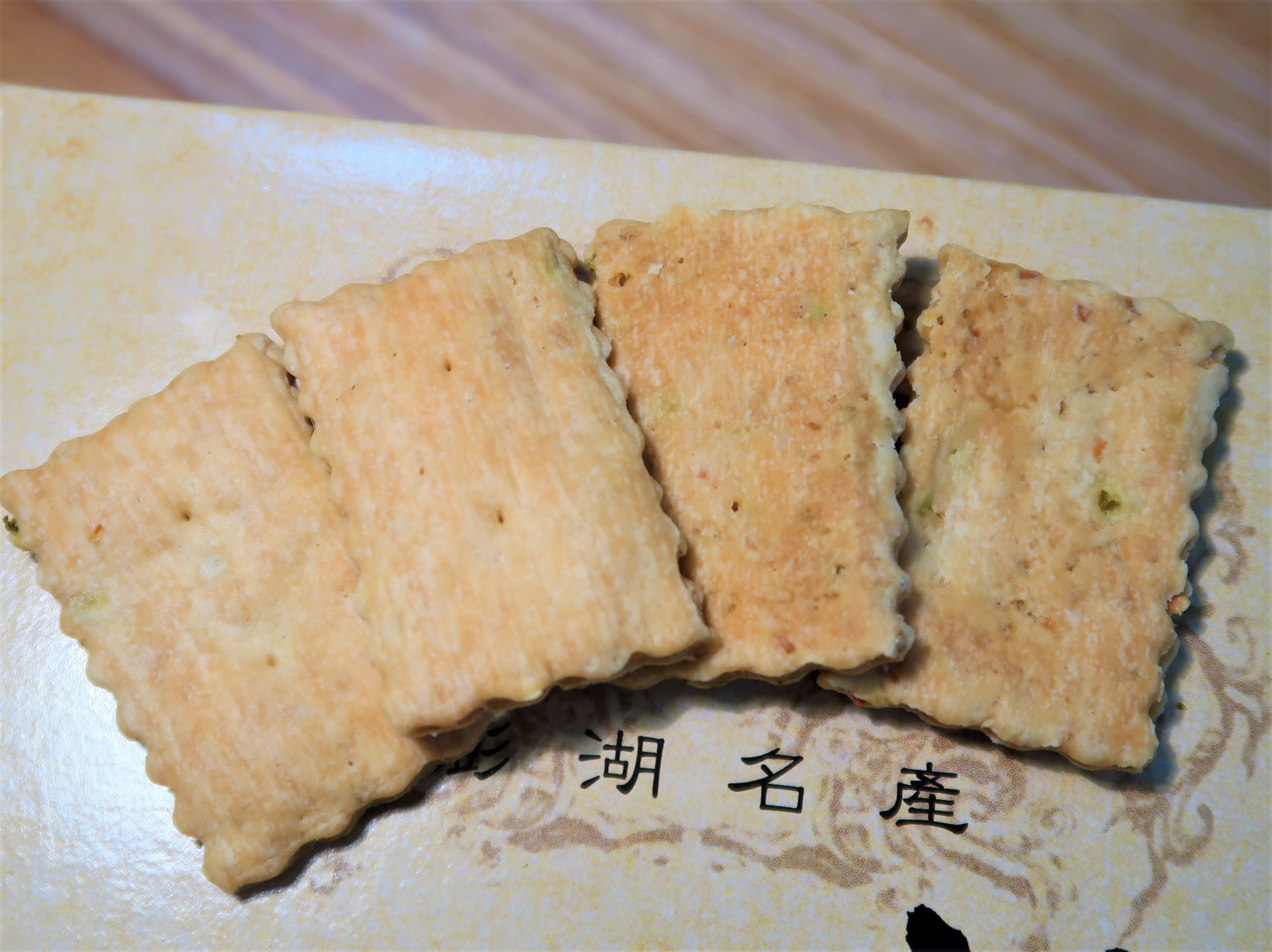
- Alternative names: Penghu Salty Biscuit
- Place of origin: Taiwan
- Serving temperature: Cold
- Main ingredients: flour, water, sugar, lard, scallions, salt, sesame seeds

Kiâm-piánn
- Traditional Chinese: 澎湖鹹餅
- Literal meaning: salty biscuit
Transcriptions
Standard Mandarin
- Tongyong Pinyin: Pónghú Syán Bǐng
Southern Min
- Tâi-lô: kiâm-piánn

Kiâm-piánn, (Chinese: 澎湖鹹餅; Tongyong Pinyin: Pónghú Syán Bǐng; Tâi-lô: Kiâm-piánn) or Penghu Salty Biscuit, is a traditional Taiwanese biscuit, originating from the island of Penghu.

== History ==
The origin of kiâm-piánn dates back to the Qing Dynasty. The first pastry chef to create these biscuits relocated to Penghu from China, where he introduced a savory variation to the predominantly sweet Taiwanese pastries of the time. This innovation was well-received, and for over a century, the shop has faithfully adhered to the original recipe, establishing salty biscuits as a signature delicacy in Penghu. Initially round, the biscuits were later changed to a rectangular shape to facilitate packaging and handling. The biscuits are characterized by a crispy texture and a savory taste with a hint of pepper, which becomes subtly sweet upon chewing.

== Ingredients and preparation ==
The traditional recipe for salty biscuits includes low-gluten flour (40%), water (15%), lard (25%), pepper powder (7%), chopped scallions, salt, sesame seeds, and white sugar (13%). The preparation involves combining low-gluten flour with all the ingredients to form a dough, which is then divided into small portions called the "filling." Separately, medium-gluten flour is kneaded to create the "skin," which is also portioned into small pieces. Each piece of filling is wrapped in the skin, flattened, folded several times, and then pressed into small rectangular shapes using a machine. The biscuits are baked for approximately fifteen minutes and, once cooled, are packaged.

== Variations ==
A vegetarian version of the biscuit is available, catering to different dietary needs.

== See also ==
- List of Taiwanese desserts
- List of desserts
- Egg yolk pastry
- Taro pastry
