= Le̍k-tāu-phòng =

Taiwanese mung bean minced meat mooncake pastry

Lek-tau-phong
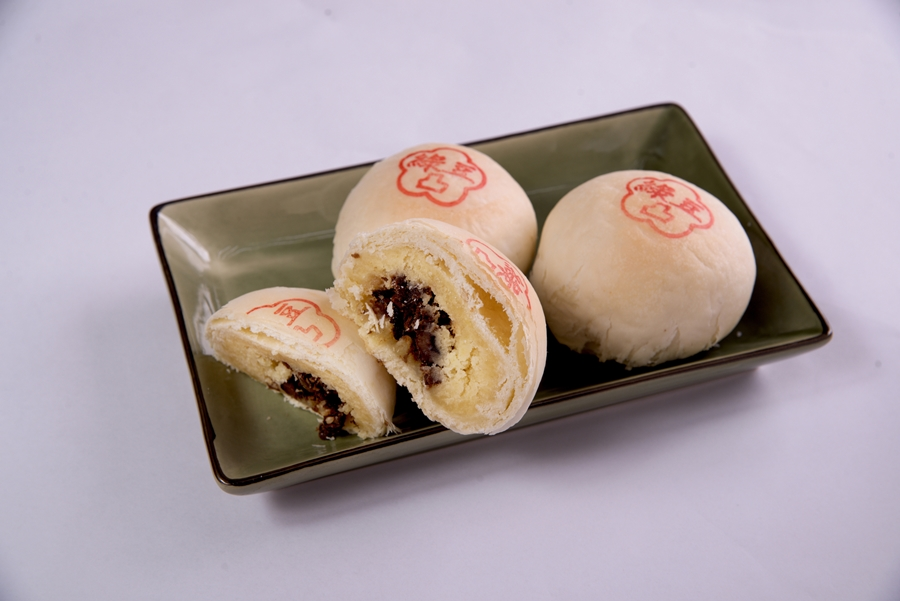
- Alternative names: Ludoupong, Taiwan Mung Bean Pastry
- Place of origin: Taiwan
- Serving temperature: Cold
- Main ingredients: flour, sugar, pork, lard, mung bean

Le̍k-tāu-phòng
- Traditional Chinese: 綠豆椪
- Simplified Chinese: 绿豆椪
Transcriptions
Standard Mandarin
- Hanyu Pinyin: Lǜdòu pèng
Southern Min
- Hokkien POJ: le̍k-tāu-phòng
- Tâi-lô: lı̍k-tāu-phòng

Le̍k-tāu-phòng or lǜdòu pèng is a traditional Taiwanese mooncake. The filling is made of sweet mung bean paste stuffed with lard and shallots and baked, and sometimes a little pork is added. In recent years, due to the emphasis on health, many operators have also introduced versions that do not contain pork, lard and other ingredients, and are purely filled with mung bean puree.

Traditional Taiwanese mooncakes are large in size (as big as the palm of your hand). Since the early 1980s, the industry in Fengyuan District, Taichung, known as the "Pastry Capital" of Taiwan, has invented small mooncakes that have no lard residue and are filled with mung bean puree filling. The portion is half the size of traditional mooncakes.

== History ==
The Lek-tau-phong emerged in the 1940s. During the Japanese colonial period in Taiwan, Japanese confectionery culture moved into Taiwan. In order to cater to Japanese tastes, Fengyuan's local pastry manufacturers learned Japanese wagashi technology, used sweeter fillings, and reduced the size of pastries, promoting the popularity of Japanese confectionery. Fengyuan's local cake shops also developed a small mooncake with mung bean paste as the filling, called gourd dun cake (葫蘆墩餅), which is the predecessor of lek-tau-phong。.

== See also ==
- List of Taiwanese desserts
- List of desserts
- Egg yolk pastry
- Taro pastry
