= Peanut ice cream roll =

Taiwanese ice cream burrito

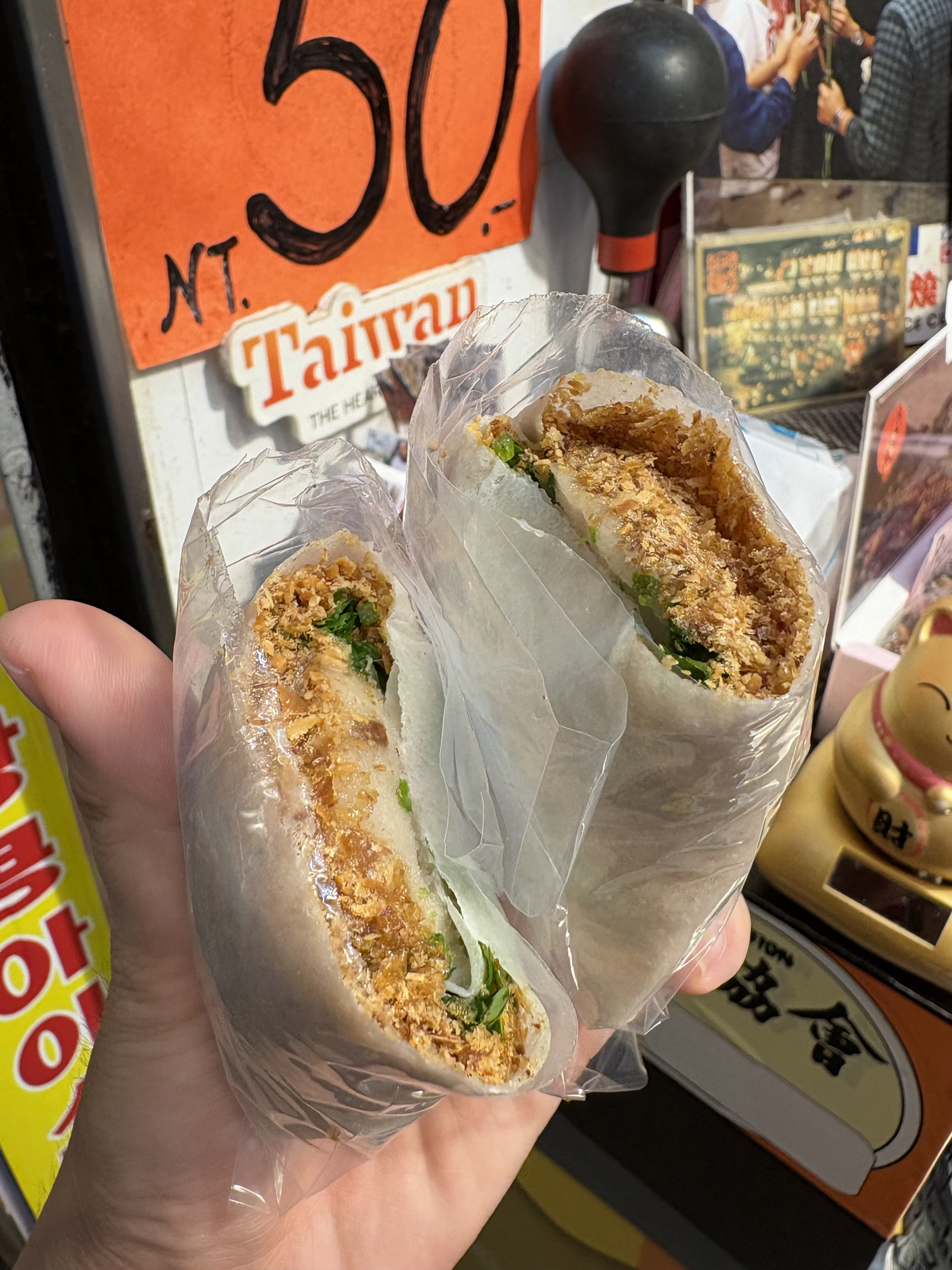
- Course: Snack
- Place of origin: Taiwan
- Region or state: Yilan County
- Main ingredients: rùn bǐng wrapper, peanut brittle, ice cream, cilantro

Peanut ice cream roll (Chinese: 花生捲冰淇淋) is a traditional vegetarian Taiwanese snack that originated from Yilan County and is commonly found at night markets and temple fairs. The snack is made up of a thin wheat-based wrapper similar to that used for rùn bǐng that is filled with shaved peanut brittle bound with malt sugar, ice cream scoops, and fresh cilantro. For the vegan version, taro is frequently used as it imparts a firm texture to ice cream without the need for dairy or eggs, as well as a traditional non-dairy, tapioca-based ice-cream called "babu". After all the ingredients are added, the wrapper is folded into a roll that resembles a burrito in both appearance and preparation. Hence it is often referred to as "ice cream burrito" in western media.

== See also ==
- Taiwanese cuisine
- List of Taiwanese desserts and snacks
- List of peanut dishes
