= Mango shaved ice =

Taiwanese shaved ice dessert with mango topping

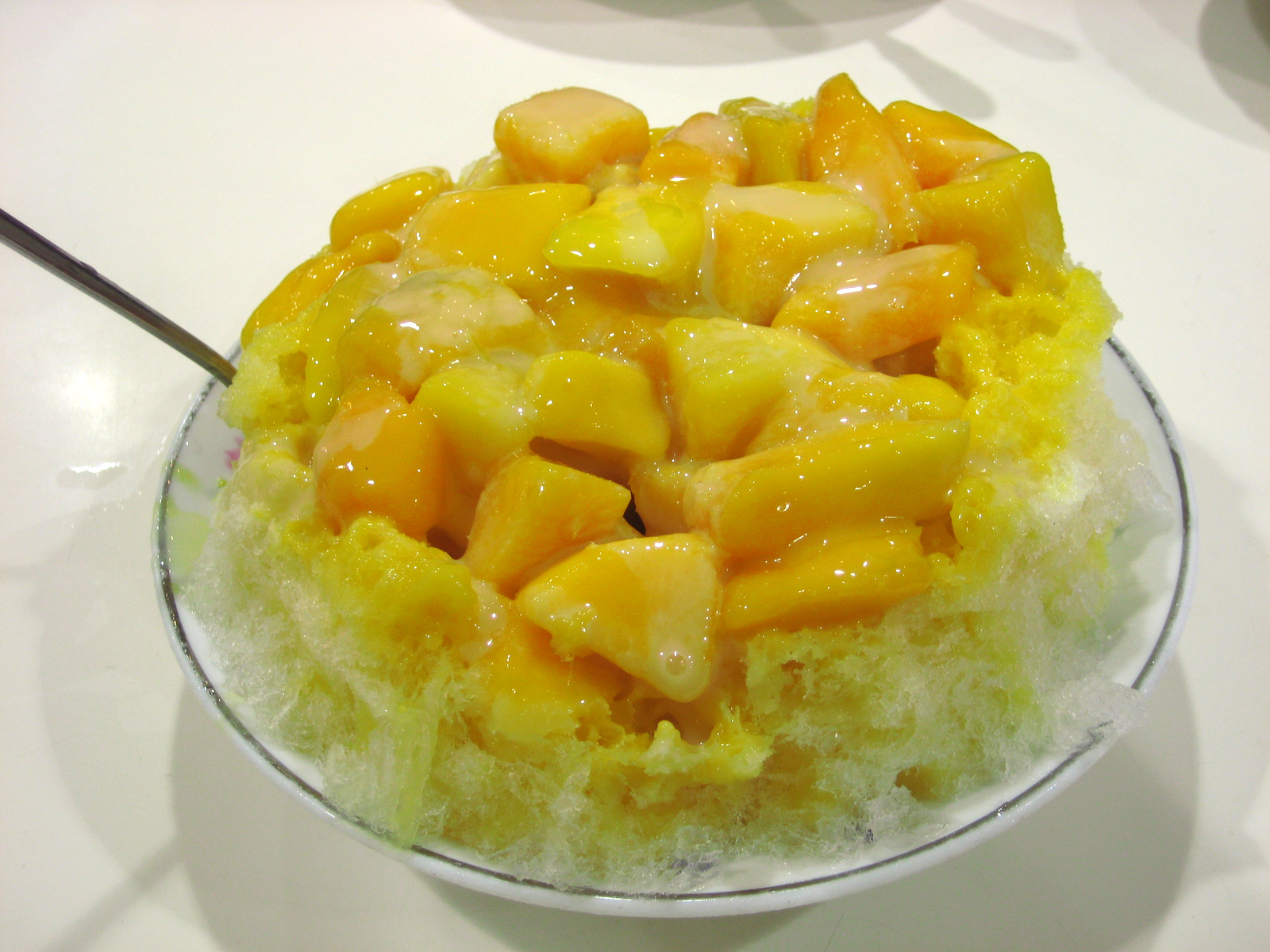
- Course: Dessert
- Place of origin: Taiwan
- Serving temperature: Cold
- Main ingredients: mango, condensed milk, ice cream, shaved ice

Mango shaved ice
- Chinese: 芒果冰
- Literal meaning: mango ice
Transcriptions
Standard Mandarin
- Hanyu Pinyin: mánggǔobīng

Alternative Chinese name
- Chinese: 檨仔冰
Transcriptions
Southern Min
- Hokkien POJ: soāiⁿ‑á-peng

Mango shaved ice is a popular dessert in Taiwan, especially enjoyed during the hot summer months. Distinct from traditional shaved ice which typically includes toppings such as tapioca pearls, taro balls, and grass jelly, mango shaved ice features fresh mango chunks, condensed milk, and mango ice cream atop shaved or finely crushed ice. This combination creates a refreshing and cooling treat that is favoured by both locals and tourists. According to surveys by CNN and various travel magazines, Taiwan's mango shaved ice has been recognized as one of the world's best desserts.

== History and origin ==
The exact origins of mango shaved ice are unclear, but it is believed to have evolved as a way to utilize surplus mangoes that were not suitable for sale due to their sour taste. Farmers would soak these underripe mangoes in salt water and then marinate them with sugar, resulting in a tangy-sweet flavour.

== Ingredients ==
The key components of mango shaved ice are fresh mango pieces, condensed milk, and mango-flavored ice cream. The mangoes are typically diced into small cubes, which are then layered over the shaved ice. Condensed milk is drizzled on top to add sweetness, and a scoop of mango ice cream often crowns the dessert, enhancing the fruity flavor and creamy texture.

== See also ==
- Red bean ice
- Ice kachang
