= Meet Fresh =

Taiwanese dessert restaurant chain

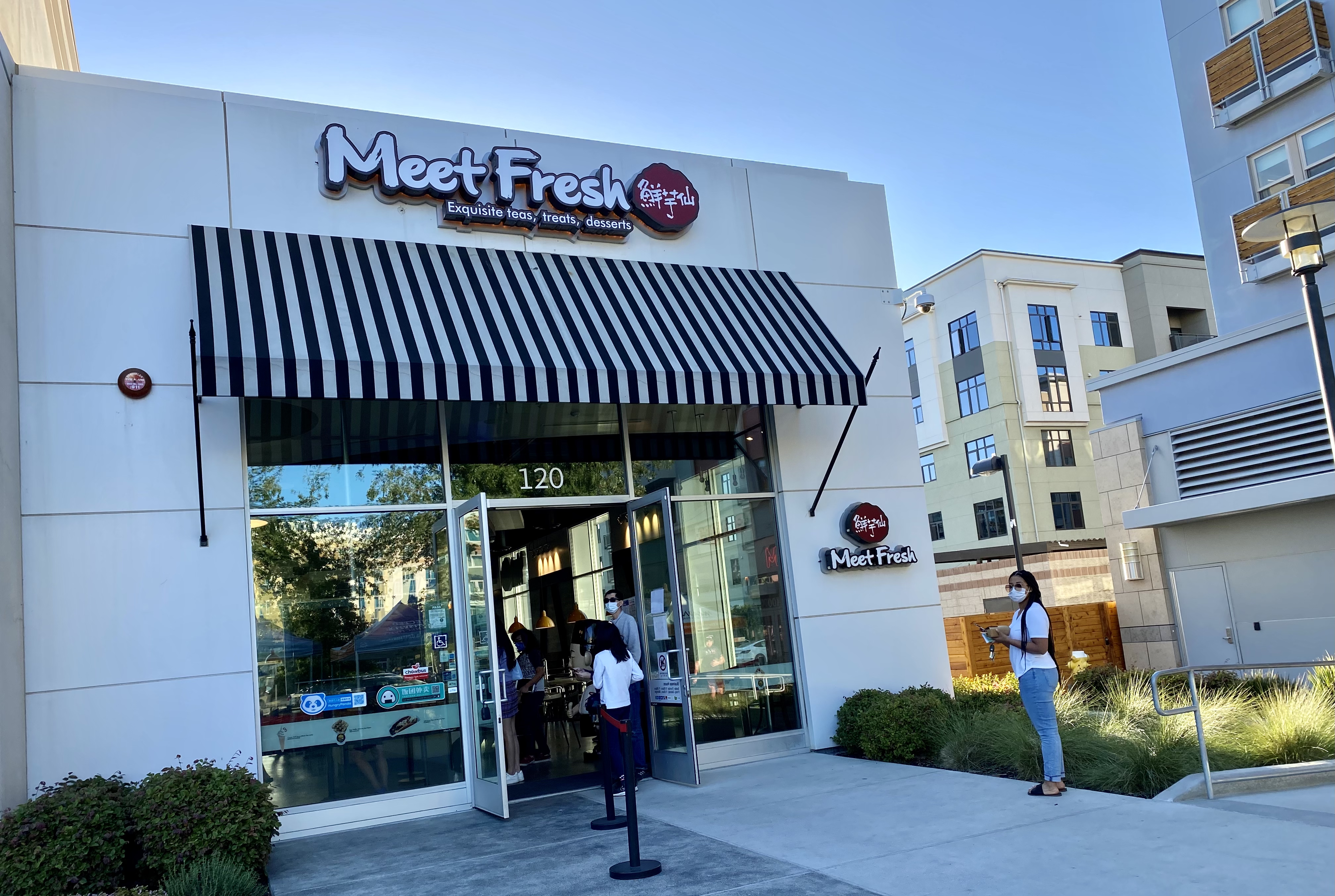
- A Meet Fresh store in California
- Native name: 鮮芋仙
- Industry: Restaurant
- Founded: 2007
- Headquarters: New Taipei City, Taiwan
- Area served: Australia, China, Hong Kong, United States, Taiwan, UK, New Zealand, Canada
- Products: dessert, taro balls, bubble tea
- Website: www.meetfresh.com.tw

Meet Fresh (Chinese: 鮮芋仙; pinyin: Xiānyùxiān) is a Taiwanese dessert restaurant chain, with locations in Asia, Australia, New Zealand, UK, Canada and the United States. Its corporate headquarters are located in New Taipei City.

Founded in 2007, the chain specializes in fresh Taiwanese desserts and drinks, such as soft taro balls, herbed jelly, shaved ice, and teas. As of 2021, the chain has over 800 locations worldwide.

== See also ==
- List of companies of Taiwan
