= Kiâm-nn̄g-ko =

Taiwanese savory sponge cake from Fengyuan, Taichung

- Alternative names: Savory sponge cake
- Type: Cake
- Course: Dessert
- Place of origin: Taiwan
- Main ingredients: flour, braised minced pork, shallots, and minced bamboo shoots

Kiâm-nn̄g-ko (Chinese: 鹹蛋糕; Tongyong Pinyin: Sián dàn gāo) is a traditional Taiwanese savory sponge cake from Fengyuan District, Taichung.

Like sponge cake, the dish is made by steaming, but with Taiwanese braised minced pork, shallots, and minced bamboo shoots sandwiched between two pieces of cake. Kiâm-nn̄g-ko first gained international attention after being introduced in the novel Taiwan Travelogue by Yang Shuang-zi after it won the 2026 International Booker Prize.

The origin of the dish dates back to 1908 during the Japanese colonial era when the construction of Taiwan's North-South Railroad was completed. Prince Kan'in Kotohito, the younger brother of Emperor Meiji, attended the ceremony which took place in Taichū Prefecture (modern day Taichung). To welcome the prince, who had previously lived in Europe and particularly liked Western-style pastries, the officials commissioned a confectioner named Lī-tsuí (呂水) to prepare a cake. Nevertheless, the kitchen had run out of sugar, so Lī-tsuí decided to use bah-sò (braised minced pork) instead. Prince Kan'in Kotohito praised highly of the cake after tasting it and awarded Lī-tsuí a large sum of money as a mark of his satisfaction. And the dessert eventually gained the status of a famous Taichung specialty.

== See also ==
- Taiwanese cuisine
- List of Taiwanese desserts and snacks
- List of cakes
