= Apple bread =

Taiwanese aromatic bread

- Type: bread
- Course: Dessert
- Place of origin: Taiwan
- Region or state: Taichung
- Created by: Liu Zheji
- Main ingredients: wheat germ, egg

Apple bread (Chinese: 蘋果麵包; pinyin: píngguǒ mìanbāo) is a popular vegetarian snack in Taiwan, commonly enjoyed as a breakfast item or a light snack. The recipe was created by Liu Zheji (Chinese: 劉哲基) and is widely available in school canteens, local grocery stores, convenience stores, and supermarkets across Taiwan. The bread is inspired by US military rations and is made from a dough enriched with wheat germ and eggs. The name Apple Bread was chosen due to the popularity of Apple Sidra advertisements at the time and the status of apples as a rare and valuable fruit in the country in the 1960s.

== History ==
Liu Zheji, born in Shandong Province and a former major in the Republic of China Army, moved to Taiwan in 1949 with the Kuomintang. After retiring from the military in 1959, he battled and recovered from third-stage tuberculosis, a recovery he attributed to his Christian faith. To support himself post-retirement, Liu started selling steamed buns. Under the suggestion of Canadian missionary Liu Dongkun (Chinese: 劉東崑), Liu developed the Apple Bread recipe and began selling it to American military personnel stationed in Taiwan. Despite initial setbacks, including health inspection failures and the severance of diplomatic ties between the United States and Taiwan, Liu eventually established a successful bakery both in the United States and in Taiwan.

== Cultural significance and evolution ==
Apple bread, primarily made from wheat germ and eggs, does not contain apples but symbolizes rarity and desirability due to the fruit's status when the bread was named. Over the years, the recipe evolved to include apple filling. The bread, with its unique wheat aroma, is considered a classic Taiwanese bread and holds a nostalgic value for many Taiwanese people.
