= Pineapple cake =

Taiwanese sweet pastry

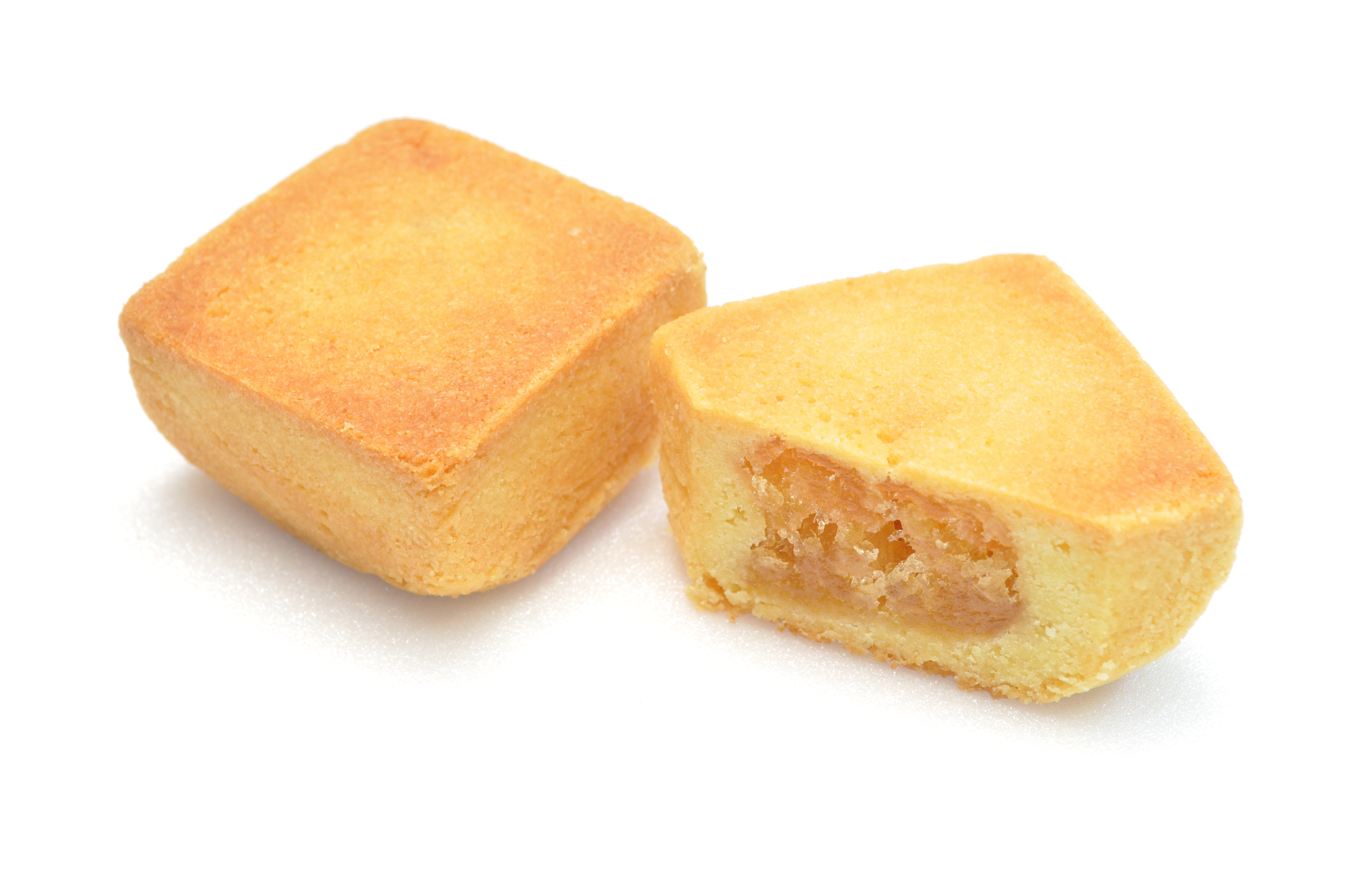
- Fenglisu, pastry with pineapple filling
- Alternative names: fènglísū, pineapple shortcake, pineapple pastry
- Course: Dessert
- Place of origin: Taiwan
- Region or state: East Asia
- Associated cuisine: Taiwanese cuisine
- Main ingredients: Pastry (butter, egg yolk, sugar), pineapple jam
- Food energy (per serving): 450 kcal (1,900 kJ)
- Other information: Pineapple tart

Pineapple cake (Chinese: 鳳梨酥; pinyin: fènglísū; Taiwanese Hokkien: 王梨酥 ông-lâi-so͘) is a Taiwanese sweet traditional pastry where pineapple filling is covered in a thin golden pastry shell.

== History ==
Both pineapple cake and pineapple tart likely came into fruition around the 16th century when the pineapple, a fruit native to South America, was introduced by Portuguese merchants to the region. Around this time, the Portuguese established a presence in places such as Malacca, Singapore and Taiwan, which they referred to as the (now archaic) name "Formosa" for the island.

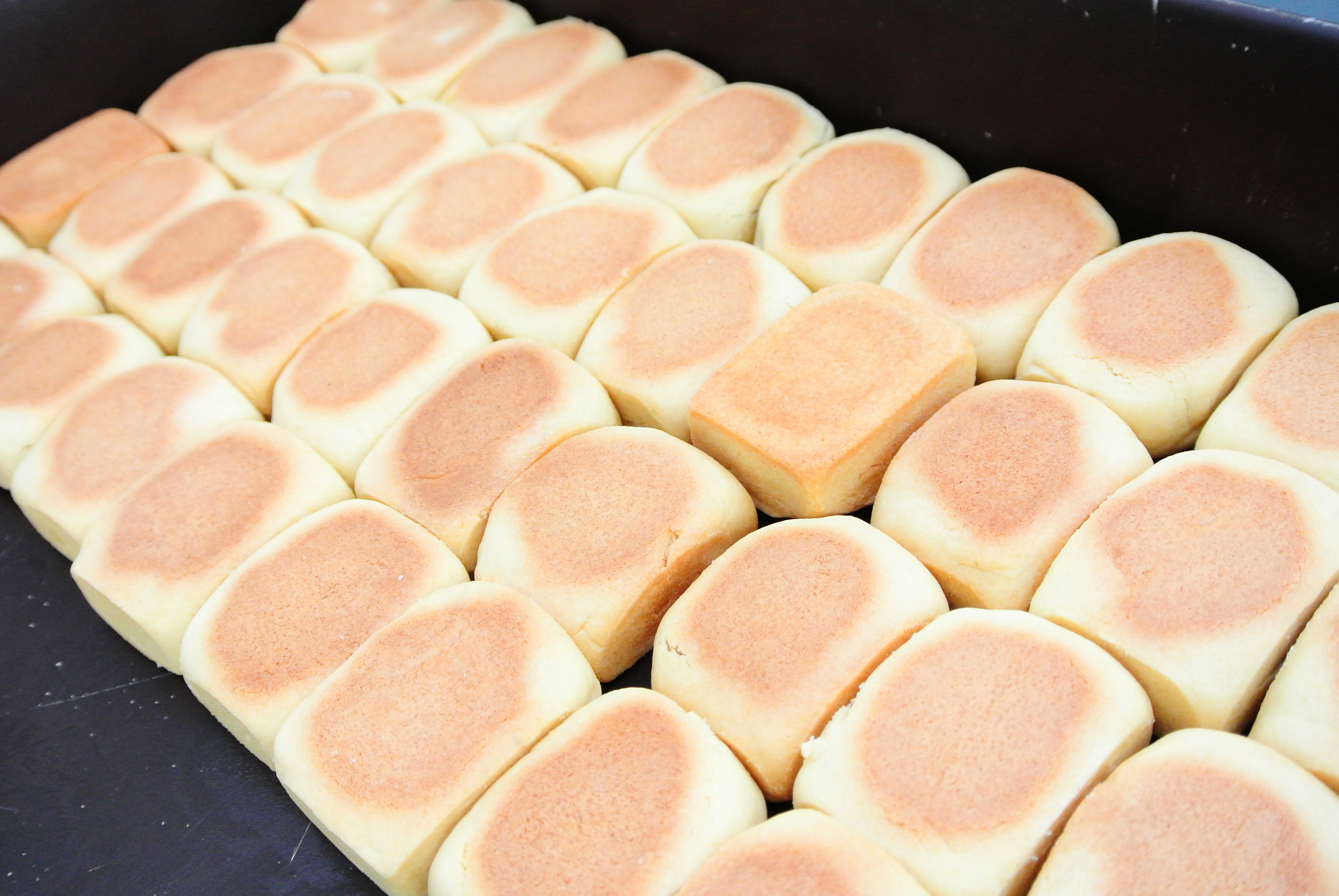
Freshly baked fenglisu

During the Japanese colonial era, the pineapple fruit became a critical component of Taiwan's economy during which Japanese industrialists imported a wide variety of pineapple cultivars and established numerous processing plants.

By the late 1930s, Taiwan had become the third-largest exporter of pineapples in the world. However, when pineapple production in Taiwan shifted toward domestic sales and use of fresh pineapple, local bakeries sought to use this surplus in pastries. While pineapple cakes had historically been produced as a ceremonial food, a combination of governmental promotion and globalization popularized the pineapple cake. Pineapple cakes have become one of the top-selling souvenirs in Taiwan.

Starting in 2005, the Taipei City Government ran an annual Taipei Pineapple Cake Cultural Festival for several years to foster the growth the local tourism industry and promote sales of the pineapple cake. In 2013, the revenue from Taiwan's pineapple cake bakeries totaled NT$40 billion (US$1.2 billion), and sales of pineapple cakes have also bolstered agricultural economies in rural parts of the country.

== Symbolism ==
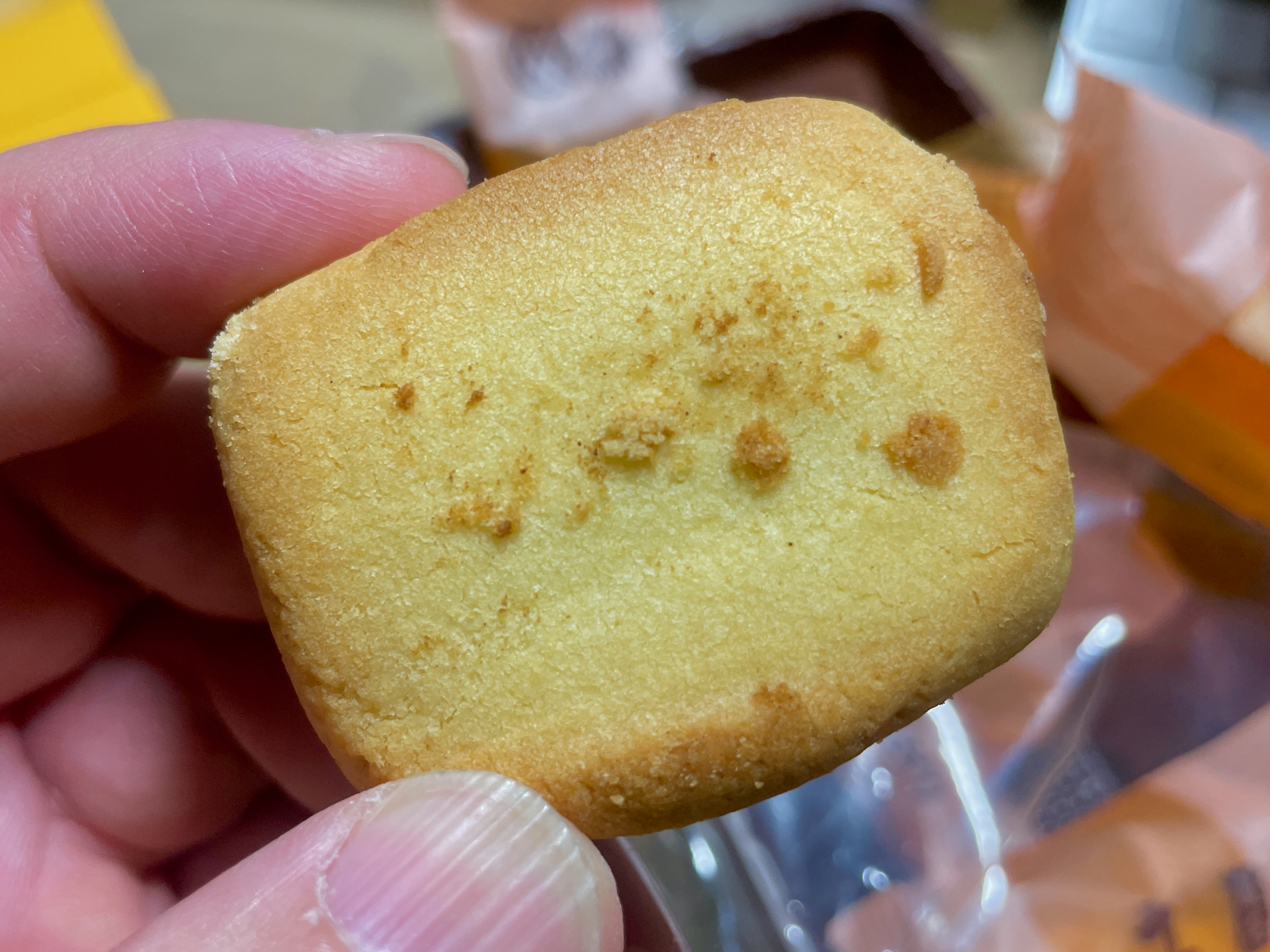
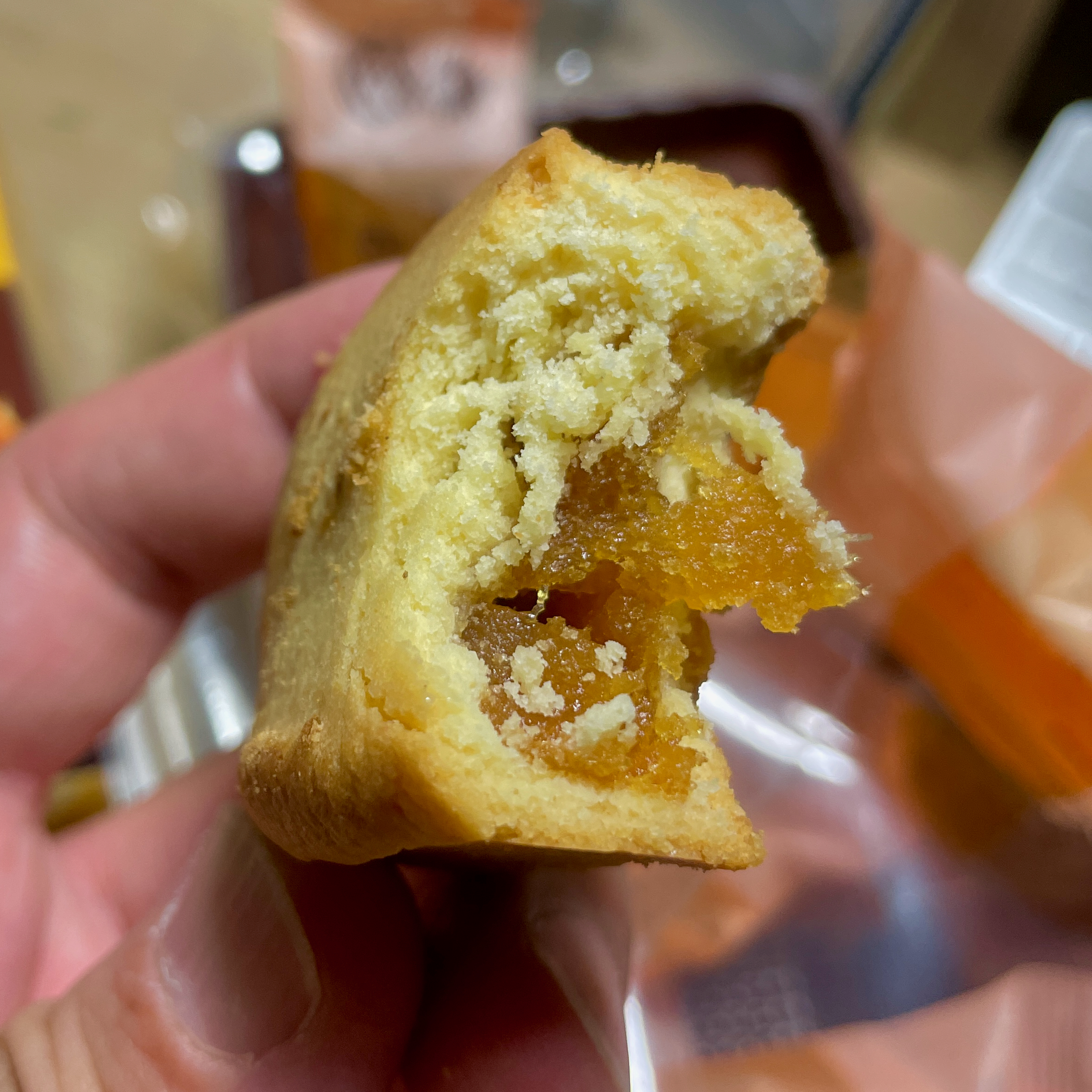
Fenglisu with pineapple filling inside

In Taiwanese Hokkien, "pineapple" (王梨; ông-lâi) sounds similar to a phrase meaning "to come forth, prosperous and thriving" (旺來; ōng-lâi). This phrase conveys the hope that many children will be born to the family. As a result, pineapple cakes are often given as engagement gifts, or simply as well-wishing presents in an everyday context. Today, pineapple cake is considered one of Taiwan's culinary symbols.

== Varieties ==
Contemporary pineapple cake bakeries have created variations on the traditional pineapple cake. The filling may also incorporate preserved egg yolks or other dried fruits such as cranberries or strawberries.

Bakeries may also add winter melon to the pineapple jam. This practice was initially an effort to make the tart pineapple filling more palatable. However, in contemporary bakeries, adding winter melon to the filling may be seen as an indicator of lower quality.

The annual Taipei Pineapple Cake Cultural Festival often featured a contest in which bakeries competed to create pineapple cakes that incorporated unconventional ingredients, such as rice or Taiwanese tea.

== Production ==
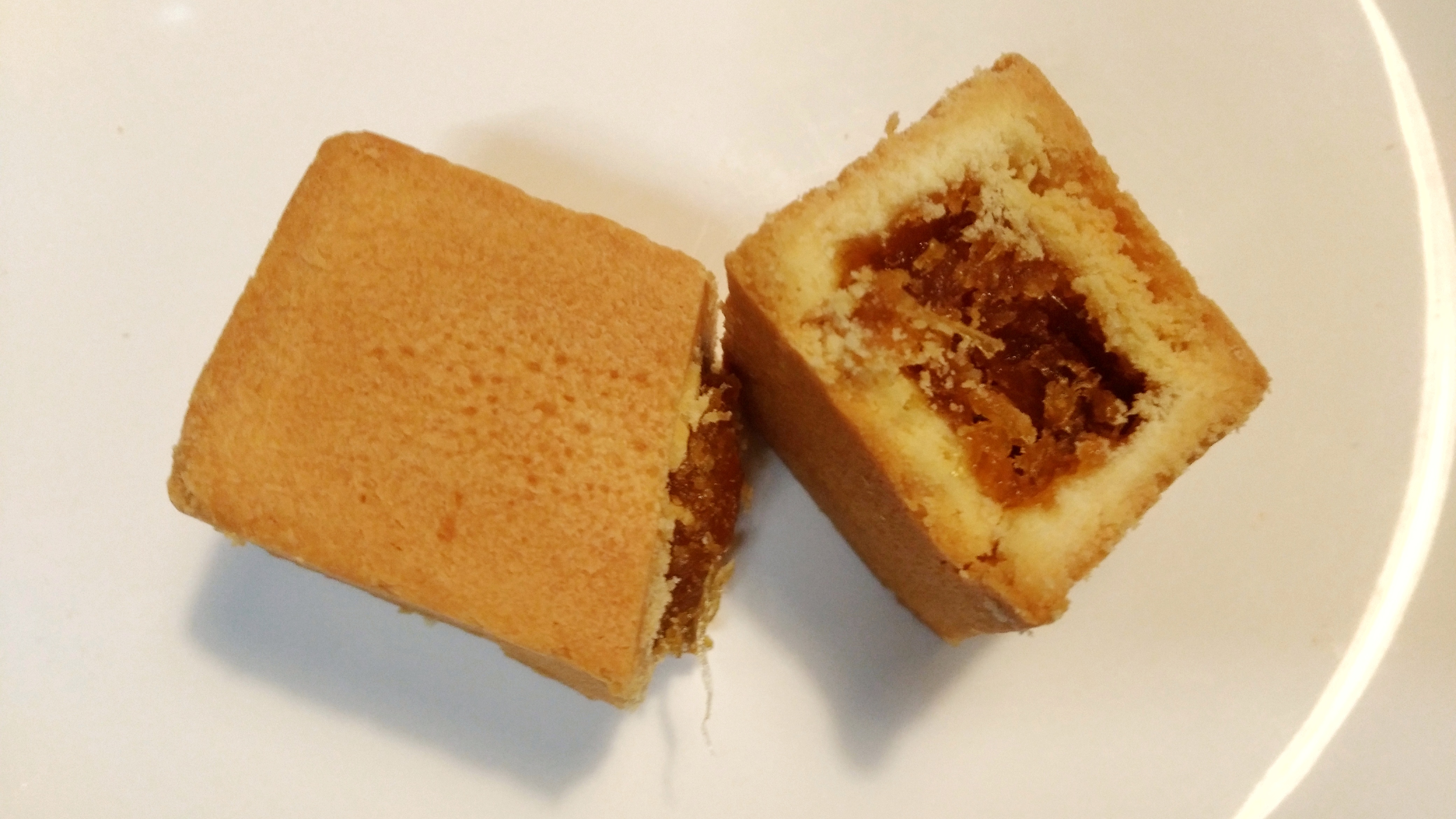
Fenglisu skin is typically made with butter or lard

The outer skin of traditional pineapple cake is made of lard, but today, butter is more commonly used. The filling is mostly made of pineapple mixed with winter melon. In recent years, many merchants have used pure pineapple to make filling. Although its taste is not as dense and soft as the winter melon filling, the unique and rich fruity flavor with such sweet and sour taste of pure pineapple filling are incomparable with winter melon filling.

== See also ==
- Pineapple production in Taiwan
- List of Taiwanese desserts and snacks
- List of pastries
- Taiwanese cuisine
- Taro pastry
