= Taro shaved ice =

Taiwanese frozen dessert

- Alternative names: Ōo-á-ping
- Type: frozen dessert
- Place of origin: Taiwan
- Main ingredients: taro, sugar, water, starch

Taro shaved ice (Chinese: 芋頭冰; Tâi-lô: ōo-á-ping) is a traditional Taiwanese frozen dessert from Taichung. The dish is primarily made from taro, sugar, water and starch. The taro is cooked, mashed, sweetened, and frozen into rectangular or square blocks. The resulting texture is firm yet crumbly rather than creamy.

The origin of the dish dates back to the Japanese colonial era when Japan introduced ice-making machines and industrial artificial ice plants to the island. The dish only gained national attention after former Taiwanese Premier and President Chiang Ching-kuo visited a shop called "Meifang Taro Ice Shop" (美芳芋仔冰城) in Dali District that sold taro shaved ice during the Mid-Autumn Festival in 1975. After its gain in popularity, the dish can now be found all across Taiwan, including southern Taiwan.

== See also ==
- Taiwanese cuisine
- List of Taiwanese desserts and snacks
- List of cakes
