= QQ egg =

Taiwanese fried sweet potato snack

QQ eggs
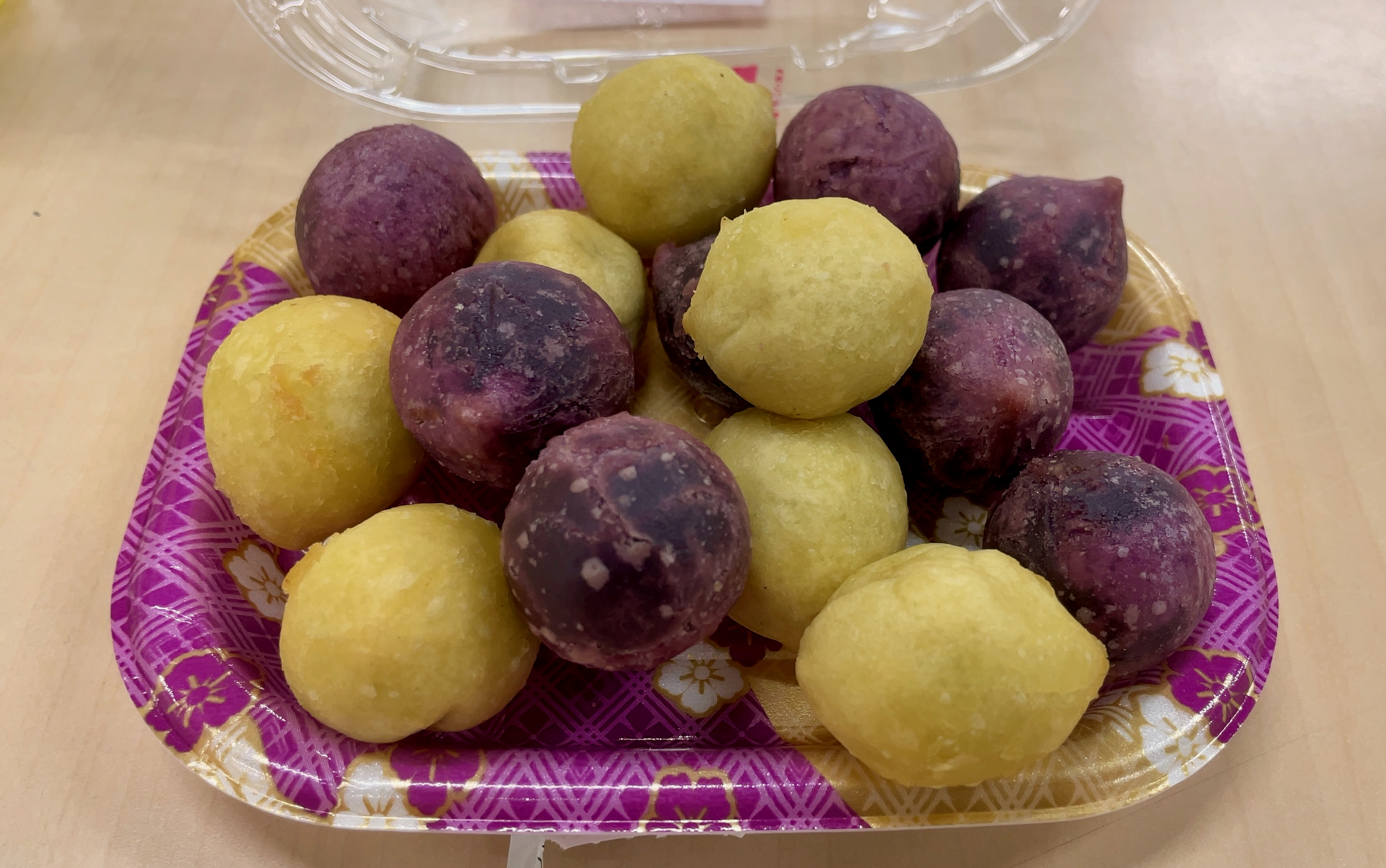
- QQ eggs freshly fried at a Taiwanese night market
- Type: Fried food
- Course: Snack
- Place of origin: Taiwan
- Region or state: Southern Taiwan
- Main ingredients: Sweet potato flour, sugar, tapioca starch
- Variations: Sweet potato balls (地瓜球), Chewy balls (啾啾蛋)

QQ eggs (Chinese: QQ蛋; pinyin: QQ dàn) are a popular Taiwanese night market snack made from sweet potato flour and tapioca starch, deep-fried into golden, crispy spheres. They are also known as sweet potato balls (Chinese: 地瓜球; pinyin: dìguā qiú).

== History ==
The origins of sweet potato balls is told through two different accounts. In the first account, an elderly man cultivated sweet potatoes beneath a bridge. After a construction crew mistakenly dig up the potatoes he had planted, he fried the potatoes for sale to avoid letting them go to waste. The snack gained widespread popularity. In the second account, the snack features Taiwan's plentiful sweet potatoes and draws inspiration from sesame balls, a deep-fried Chinese dish.

It is a signature snack at Taiwanese night markets. QQ eggs have a Q texture that has been described as chewy. In North Taiwan, the dish is called sweet potato balls (地瓜球). In Central Taiwan in places such as Chiayi County, Nantou County, and Yunlin County, the dish is called chiu chiu tan (啾啾蛋) or QQ egg (QQ蛋). In Southern Taiwan, the dish is called QQ egg.

== See also ==
- Taiwanese cuisine
- List of Taiwanese desserts and snacks
- Taiwanese night markets
