= Shengang District =

District of Taichung, Taiwan

Shengang 神岡區 Kamioka
- District
- Shengang District
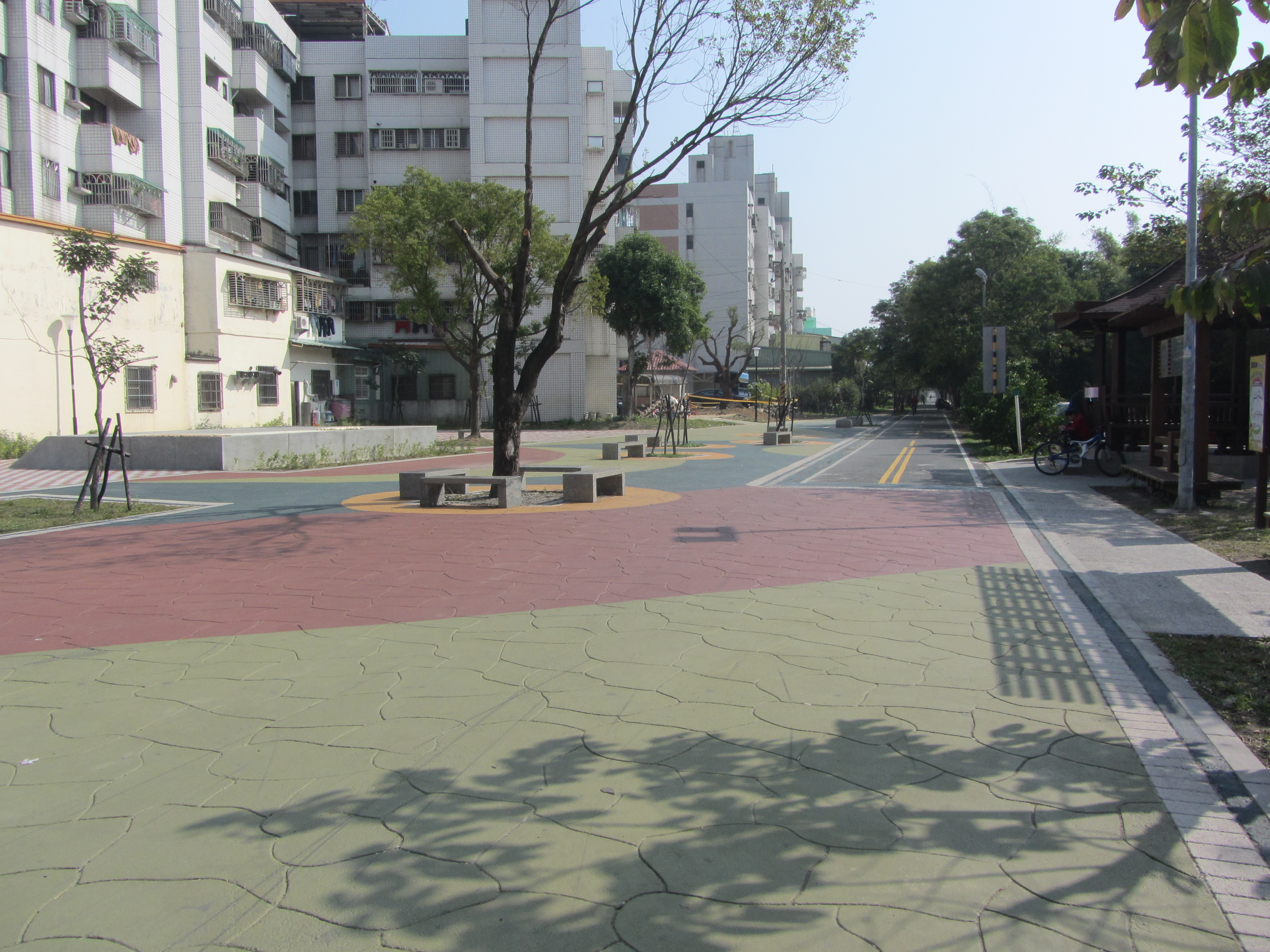

- Location in Taichung City
- Coordinates: 24°15′32.3″N 120°39′47.2″E
- Country: Taiwan
- Special municipality: Taichung
- Established (District): 2010

Area
  - Total: 35.0445 km^{2} (13.5308 sq mi)

Population (February 2023)
  - Total: 64,362
  - Density: 1,836.6/km^{2} (4,756.7/sq mi)
- Time zone: UTC+8 (CST)
- Website: www.shengang.taichung.gov.tw (in Chinese)

Shengang District (Chinese: 神岡區; pinyin: Shéngāng Qū) is a district in northwestern Taichung City, Taiwan, known for its origin of suncakes.

== Administrative divisions ==
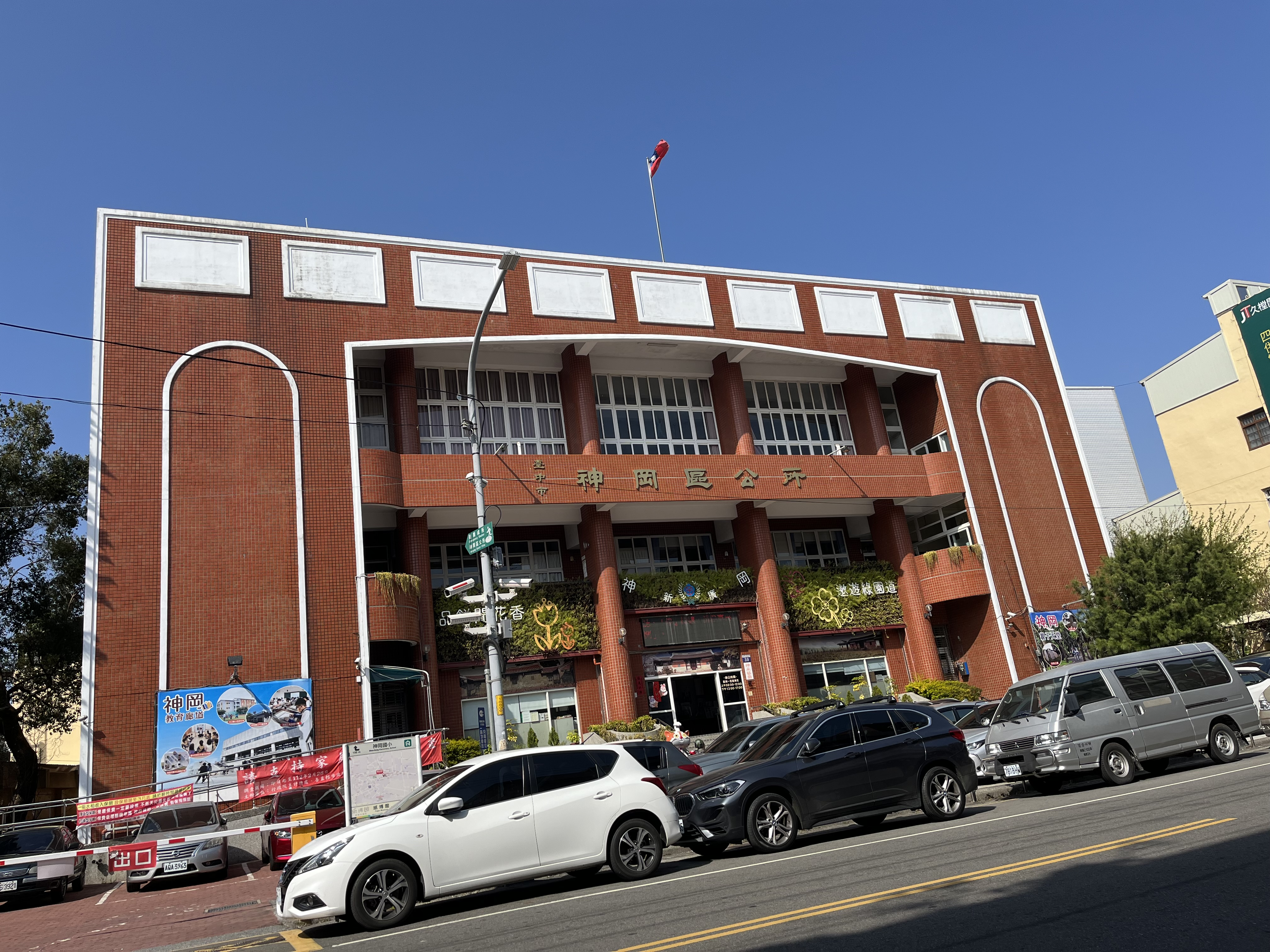
Shengang District Office

Shengang, Zhuangqian, Beizhuang, Zhuanghou, Zunqian, Zundu, Xinzhuang, Shanpi, Shekou, Shenan, Sanjiao, Dashe, Anli, Fengzhou, Shenzhou and Xizhou Village.

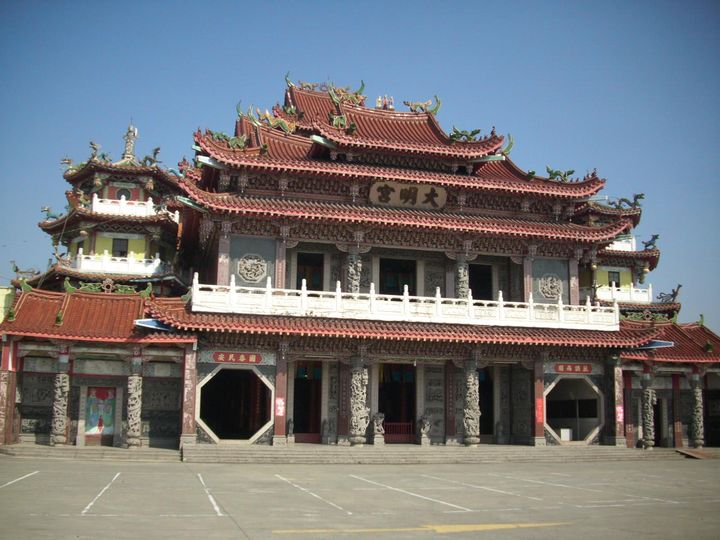
Ming Dynasty palace

== Native products ==
- Longan
- Lychee
- Rice
- Pumpkin
- Moon cake
- Suncake

== Tourist attractions ==
- Taiwan Balloons Museum

== Transportation ==
National Highway 1 and National Highway 4 run through Shengang.

== Notable natives ==
- Chang Hung-lu, member of Legislative Yuan
