= Suncake (Taiwan) =

Taiwanese flaky cakes filled with maltose

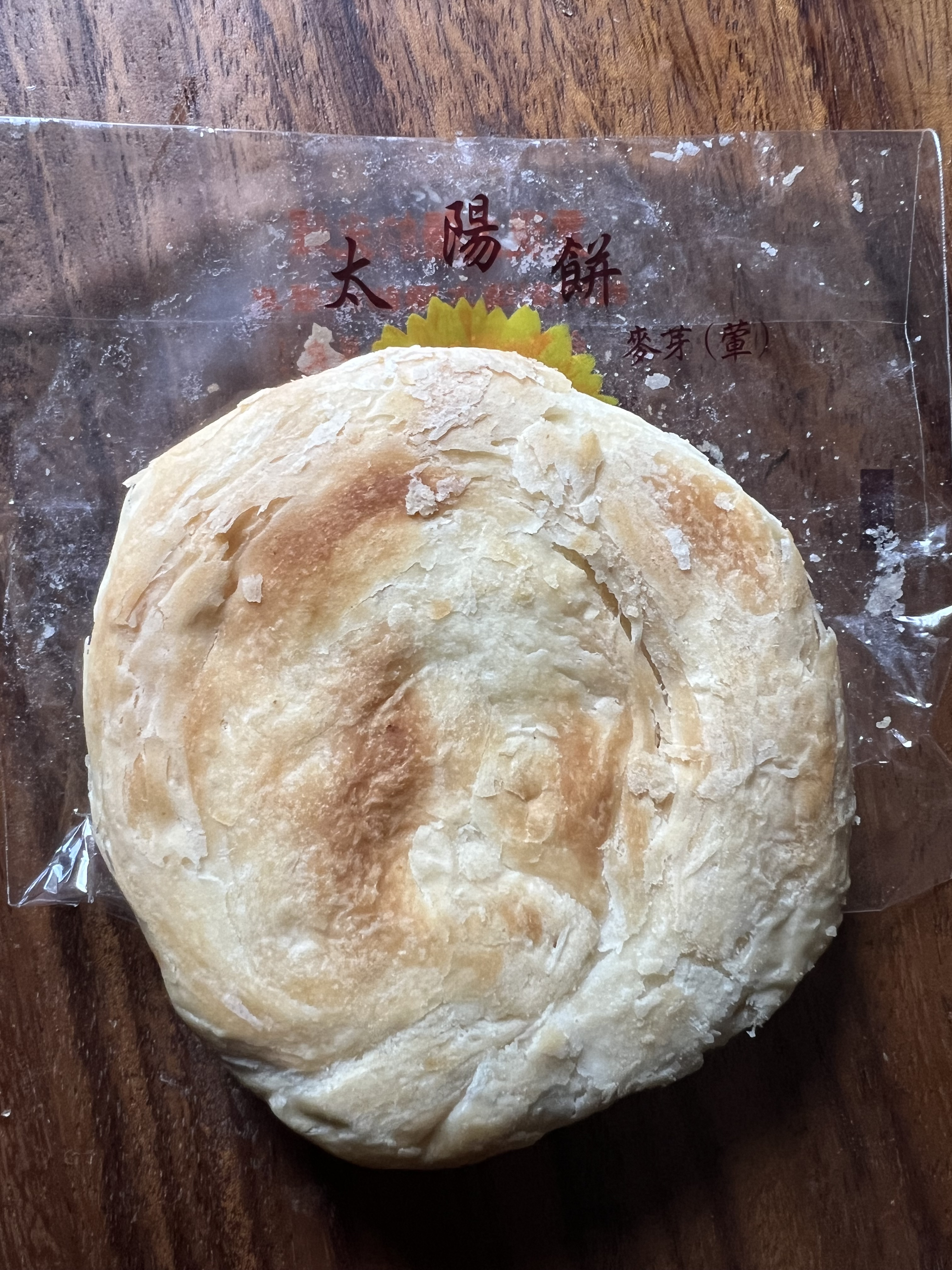
- Alternative names: Taiyang bing
- Type: Pancake
- Course: Dessert
- Place of origin: Taichung, Taiwan
- Created by: Lin family
- Main ingredients: Maltose
- Food energy (per serving): 460 kcal (1,900 kJ)

Suncake
- Traditional Chinese: 太陽餅
- Simplified Chinese: 太阳饼
Transcriptions
Standard Mandarin
- Hanyu Pinyin: tàiyángbǐng
Yue: Cantonese
- Jyutping: taai3 joeng4 beng2
Southern Min
- Hokkien POJ: thài-iông-piáⁿ

A suncake, or taiyang bing, is a Taiwanese dessert originally from the city of Taichung, in central Taiwan. The typical fillings consist of maltose (condensed malt sugar), and they are usually sold in special gift boxes as souvenirs for visitors. Some famous suncake pastry shops always have long lines of people waiting to buy boxed suncakes.

Suncakes are round, and they may vary in size. They are characterized by flaky crusts. Most people eat them with tea, and some people dissolve them in hot water to make a porridge-like dessert.

== Origin ==
The first suncakes were made by the Lin family in the Shekou area of Shengang Township, Taichung County (now part of Taichung City). The Lin family used condensed malt sugar as a filling for cake pastries. Later, pastry maker Wei Qing-hai modified the cakes to their current form.

Though not originally called "suncakes", they were given the name by the owner of "Sun Booth", one of the most famous pastry shops that sells them. The name was not trademarked, and other pastry shops have used the same name for their own suncakes.

== See also ==
- Mooncake
- Sweetheart cake
- Taiwanese cuisine
- List of Taiwanese desserts and snacks
- List of pastries
