= Apple Sidra =

Taiwanese soft drink

- Type: Soft drink
- Manufacturer: Oceanic Beverage Co., Inc
- Origin: Taiwan
- Introduced: 1963; 63 years ago
- Colour: Caramel color
- Flavor: Apple cider
- Ingredients: Carbonated water; Fructose; Cane sugar; Apple flavor; Natural apple juice concentrate juice; Caramel; Citric acid; Natural apple flavor; Apple juice

Apple Sidra (Chinese: 蘋菓西打; pinyin: Píngguǒ Xīdǎ) is a Taiwanese carbonated soft drink which was first distributed in 1965. It is manufactured by Oceanic Beverages Co., Inc. and is mainly sold in Taiwan. It has a sweet natural apple flavor with a bit of citrus and is made without any preservatives or artificial flavors. It is sold in 250 and 330 ml cans, 275 ml glass bottles, and 600 ml, 1250 ml, and 2 liter bottles.

== History ==
Apple Sidra was first conceptualized in 1963 and then produced in 1965 with the help of Taiwanese investors from the Philippines and the United States. It was introduced to the Philippines in 1969 where it was sold in glass bottles. It was first made in three-piece aluminium cans, though in 1981 became one of the first drinks in Asia to use the new two-piece can designs. Today, Apple Sidra is manufactured in Taiwan and it is available in other countries in niche stores for soft drinks.

== Safety problems ==
In 2019, Oceanic Beverages started getting complaints of contaminants being found in the two-liter bottles of Apple Sidra. This led them to recall 1.2 million bottles of Apple Sidra because of a contamination in them. The contamination was suspected to be because of a sterilization failure in their factories. Around 80,000 two-liter bottles produced between July 4 and July 18, 2018, are believed to have been contaminated according to Oceanic Beverages. The company was fined twice in 2018 due to a different contamination in Apple Sidra products which violates the Act Governing Food Safety and Sanitation. They were fined NT$1,000,000 in November 2018 and NT$1,200,000 in December 2018.

Following Health Bureau inspections in April and May, 2023, production was suspended until remaining quality issues were addressed. The company sold real estate with an estimated value of NT$138 million in order to cover lost revenue and the cost of facility upgrades. Production resumed in November after new batches of the drink passed inspections. It returned to store shelves in December.
