= Concave cake =

Type of confectionery

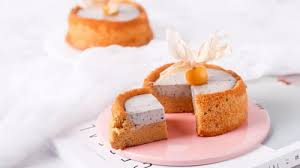
- Place of origin: Taiwan
- Main ingredients: egg, honey, sugar, flour

Concave cake (Chinese: 凹蛋糕; pinyin: āodàngāo, half-cooked cake) became popular in Chinese society after a Taiwanese variety show introduced it. The cake filling leaks out when sliced, similar in appearance to a volcano. The traditional recipe combines egg, egg yolk, honey, white sugar and low-gluten flour. Filling flavors range from traditional honey to exotic flavors like cheese, matcha and chocolate.

Concave cake was initially considered unsuccessful due to its namesake shape. However, it caught traction in China, and the cake is now part of popular culture.

== Ingredients ==
Concave cakes are commonly made using eggs, egg yolk, low-gluten flour, honey and a small portion of sugar.

== History ==
Concave cake is believed to have originated from Portugal during the Age of Discovery. Women who worried about their husbands and family members traveling as sailors baked concave cakes as a symbol of “sunny days” and good luck.

Between the 15th and 17th centuries, the cake was introduced to Nagasaki, a city in Japan best known for its roles in ending the Second World War.

The original variety of this cake was honey, but as its popularity grew, different flavors such as strawberry, Earl Grey and matcha emerged.

== Popularity ==
=== Onset ===
The variety show Kangxi Lai Le in Taiwan is credited with sparking the concave cake trend in April 2013 when it recommended the cake. Due to the show's popularity, online searches for the term "concave cakes" rose overnight. Although the cake had previously garnered attention in Japan, the show helped increase popularity of the cakes in Taiwan and China. Today, several shops in Taiwan advertise themselves as offering “authentic” concave cake.

=== Celebrities and television programs ===
Celebrities and television programs lauded the concave cake. Kangxi Lai Le introduced the cake on June 16, 2013. The host Dee Shu and Kevin Tsai recommended and praised it, creating a trend among the Taiwanese public. Taiwanese comedian Na Dou once claimed that “If someone wants to eat a half-cooked cake, they will have to wait for half a year,” to represent how difficult it was to buy one. Other variety shows such as Super Taste also introduced this cake.

=== Hong Kong ===
This trend arrived in Hong Kong after Taiwan. The owner of a dessert shop decided to introduce this cake after reducing the sweetness and making the cake spongier in order to cater to local tastes. Bakeries across the city sell this cake as they see the potential in other Asian countries.

== Counterfeit controversy ==
Some China stores were blamed for “shanzhai,” or fake cakes. In 2014, a bakery in China called Grandpa Rick was forced to shut down after it was accused of illegally claiming itself as the franchisee of a Japanese Concave Cake store called Rikuro; Grandpa Rick used its name, logo and false promotion of its history. It used egg yolks and whites out of cartons rather than fresh ones, as promoted, the company is now under investigation.
