= Taro ball =

Traditional Taiwanese dessert made of taro

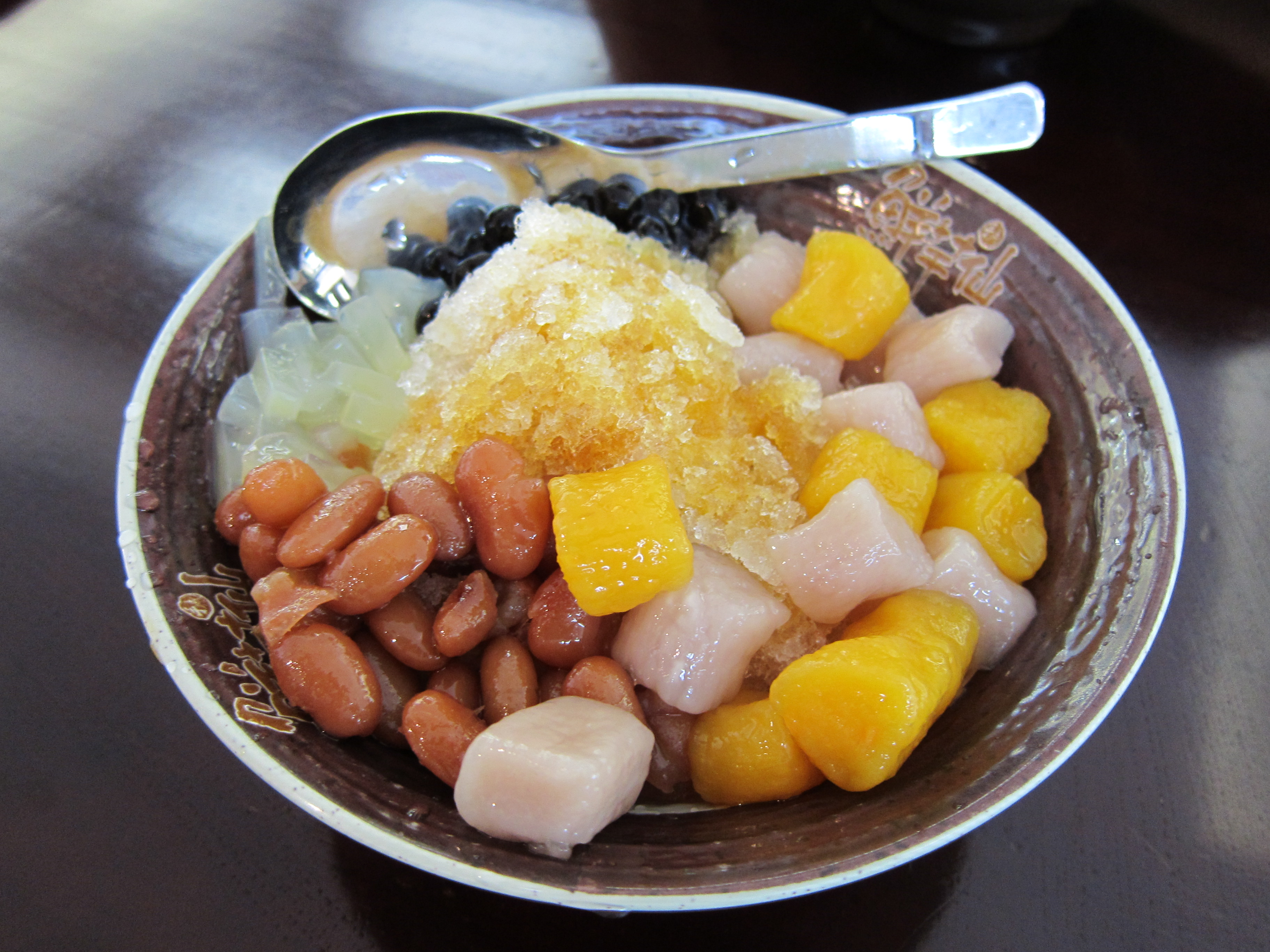
- A cup of taro and sweet potato balls from Meet Fresh
- Course: Dessert
- Place of origin: Taiwan
- Main ingredients: Taro, sweet potato or potato flour, water

Taro ball (Chinese: 芋圓; Pe̍h-ōe-jī: ō͘-îⁿ) is a traditional Taiwanese cuisine dessert made of taro. It can be found in almost every part of Taiwan and other parts of the world selling Taiwanese desserts, among which Jiufen's taro ball is said to be the most famous.

The taro balls can be made by mixing mashed taro with water and sweet potato flour or potato flour, making the taro balls more springy or softer respectively. The colour of mashed taro makes the dessert appear crystal purple or grey. The mashed taro can be replaced by mashed sweet potato or ground mung bean and becomes the yellow sweet potato ball (地瓜圓) or the green mung bean ball (綠豆圓).

The dessert can be served with syrup either icy or hot. It is also very common to use taro balls and sweet potato balls to top other Taiwanese desserts like douhua or tshuah-ping.

== See also ==
- Taiwanese cuisine
- List of Taiwanese desserts and snacks
