= Egg yolk pastry =

Taiwanese mooncake pastry filled with salted duck egg yolk and red bean paste

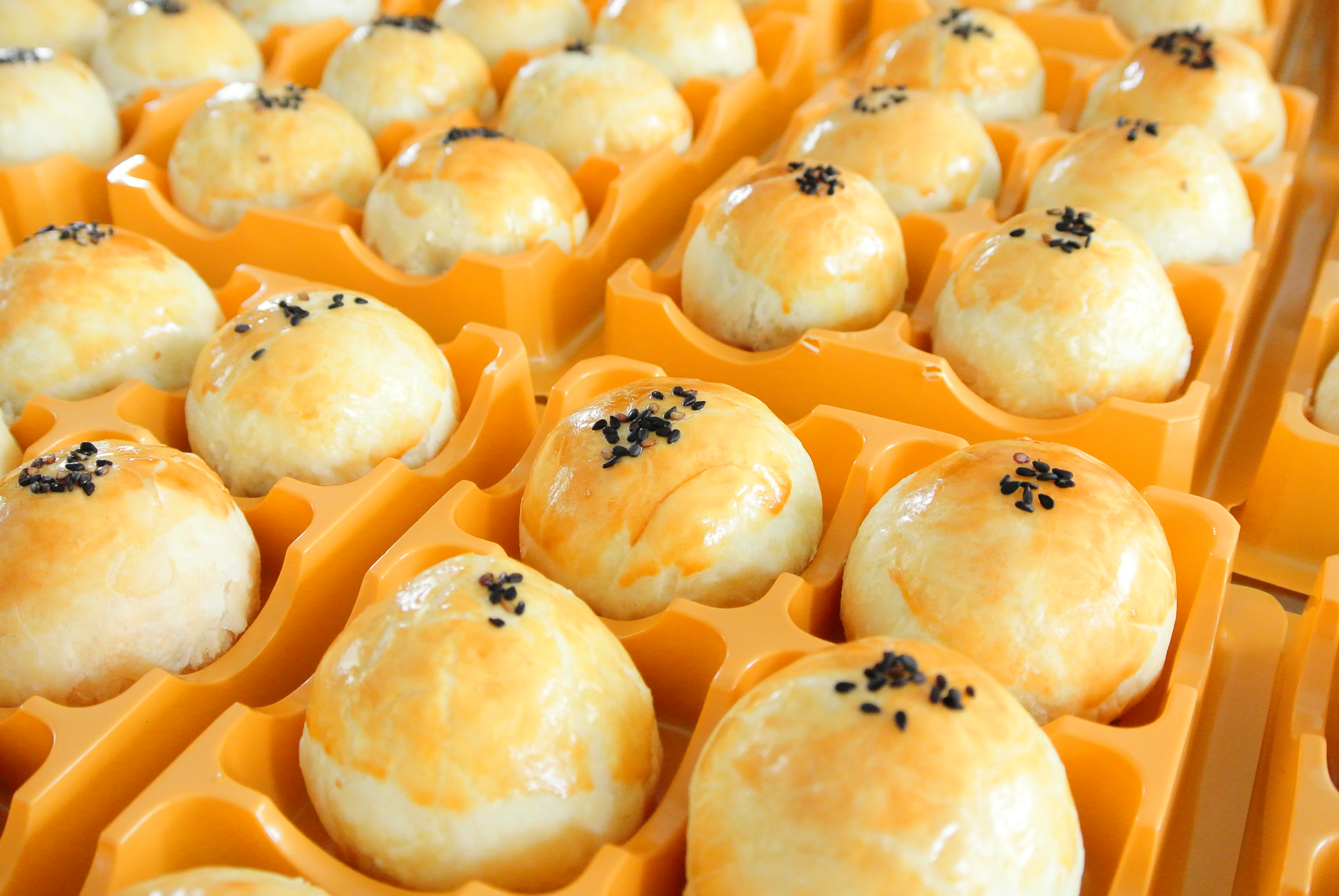
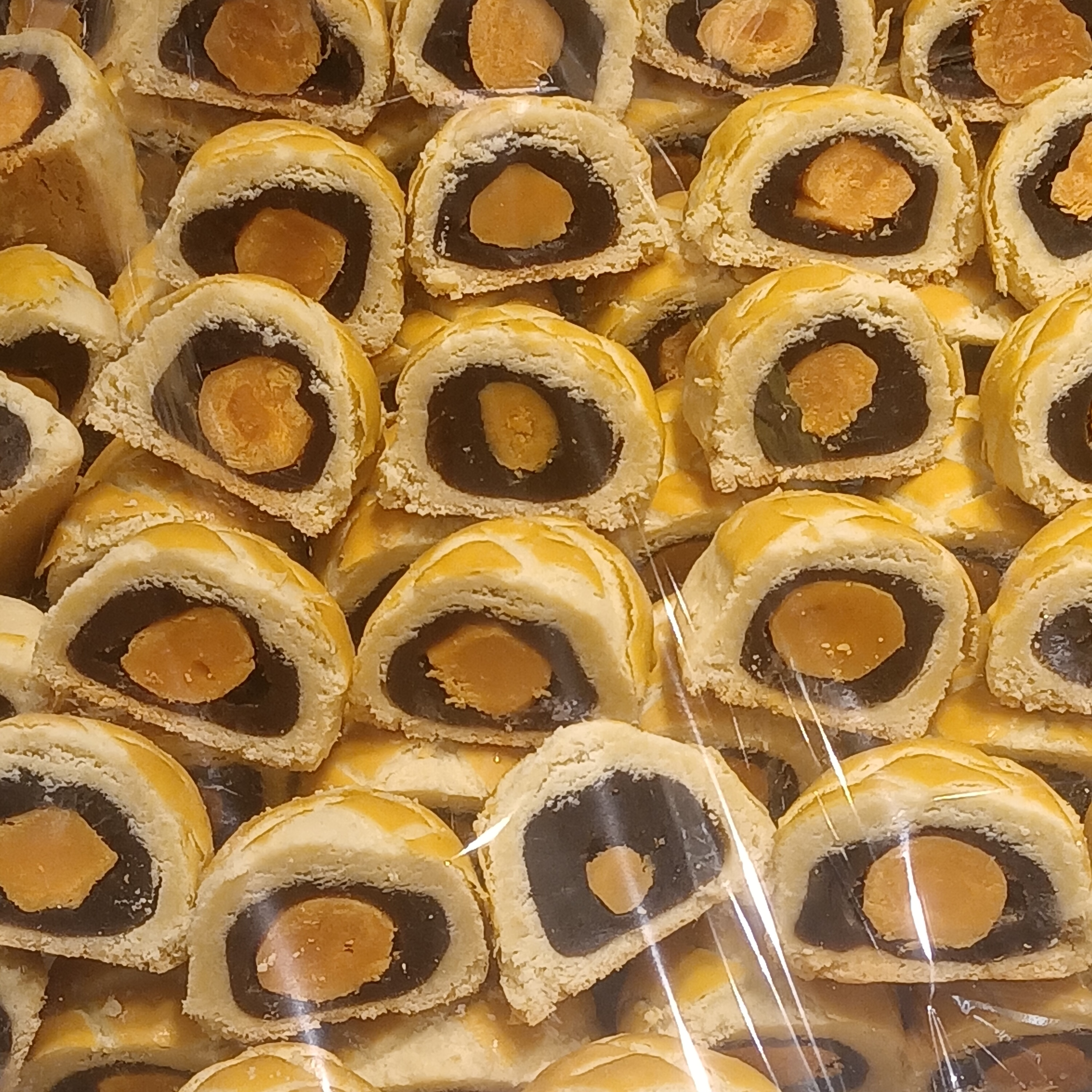
- Alternative names: Dan Huang Su
- Place of origin: Taiwan
- Region or state: Taichung
- Created by: Chen Zengxiong
- Serving temperature: Cold
- Main ingredients: flour, sugar, lard, red bean

Egg yolk pastry
- Traditional Chinese: 蛋黃酥
Transcriptions
Standard Mandarin
- Hanyu Pinyin: Dànhuángsū

Egg yolk pastry or dànhuángsū is a traditional Taiwanese mooncake of which the filling is made of salted duck egg yolk and red bean paste. According to the "Baked Food Information Magazine" in August 1986, the inventor of mini mooncakes and egg yolk pastries is Chen Zengxiong, the third generation descendant of the century-old bakery "Baoquan" in Fengyuan District, Taichung.

== Preparation method ==
Egg yolk pastries use naturally fermented salted egg yolks marinated in red soil with grape seed oil, and they are made with many layers.

== See also ==
- List of Taiwanese desserts
- List of desserts
- Lek-tau-phong
- Taro pastry
