= Taro pastry =

Taiwanese buttery, flaky pastry with taro fillings

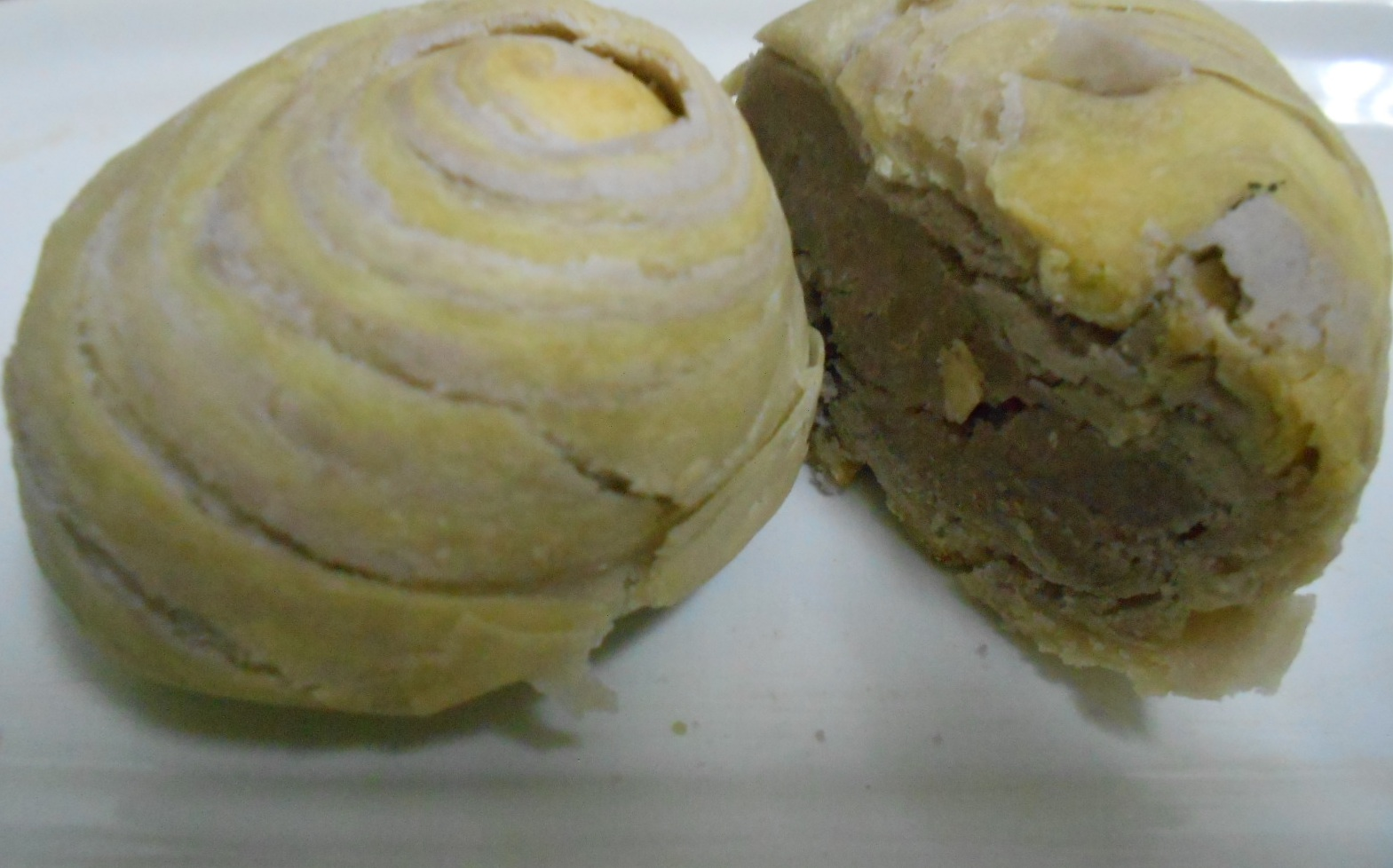
- Type: pastry
- Place of origin: Taiwan
- Region or state: Taichung
- Main ingredients: flour, butter, sugar, taro filling

Taro pastry (Note: Taiwanese Mandarin: Yùtóusū (芋頭酥); Taiwanese Hokkien: ōo-á-soo (芋仔酥)) is a Taiwanese shortbread snack with a spherical shape and made with taro as sweet filling. It first appeared in Taichung City, Taiwan in the late 1980s. At that time, it was made from surplus taro, but it later became a local snack.

== Method of preparation ==
The main method of making taro pastry is to wrap the pastry made with flour and butter with the filling made of taro puree and place it in the oven. The pastry is typically baked until its outer layers become crisp and lightly browned. The taro filling gives the pastry a soft texture and a mildly sweet flavor.

== See also ==
- List of Taiwanese desserts
- Pineapple cake
- Suncake
- Egg yolk pastry
