= Muriqui (disambiguation) =

Muriqui or woolly spider monkeys, are monkeys of the genus Brachyteles.

Muriqui may also refer to:

- Muriqui, Mangaratiba, a neighborhood in the Brazilian city Mangaratiba-RJ
- Muriqui (footballer), nickname of Luiz Guilherme da Conceição Silva, Brazilian footballer
