= Queijadinha =

Portuguese confection

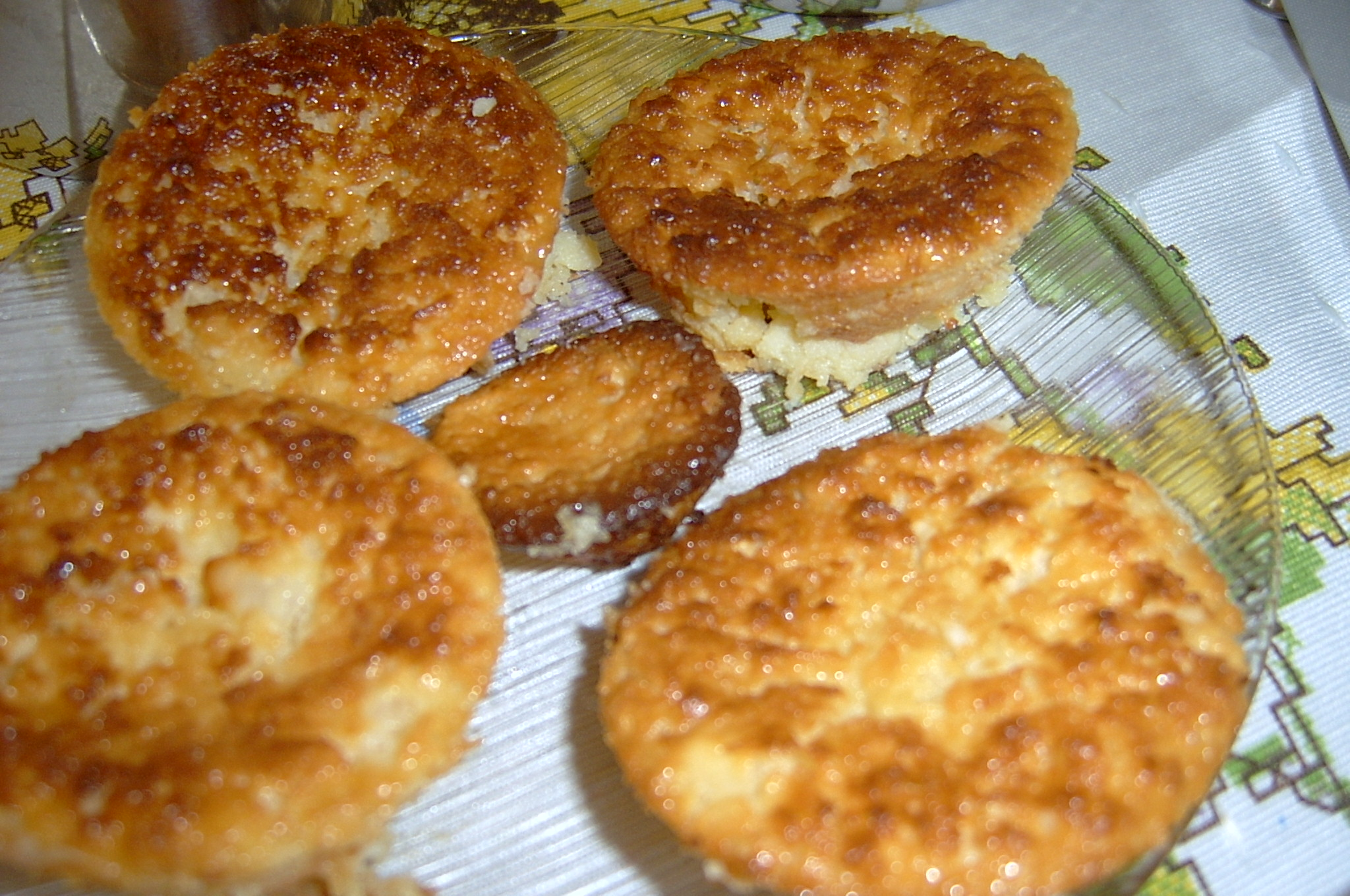
- Brazilian queijadinha
- Type: Custard tart
- Place of origin: Brazil, Portugal
- Main ingredients: Coconut, cheese, sweetened condensed milk, sugar, butter, egg yolks

Queijadinha is a custard tart which originated in Brazil. There are many types of "queijadinhas", but the traditional one is prepared with these main ingredients: grated coconut and cheese, sweetened condensed milk, sugar, butter and egg yolks. Queijadinhas are very common in bakeries and children's parties.

Queijada de Sintra is a type of queijada pastry made in Sintra, Portugal.

== See also ==
- Queijada - a similar Portuguese sweet
- Cocada - another coconut-based confection popular in Latin America
- List of Brazilian sweets and desserts
