= Muriqui, Mangaratiba =

Muriqui Vila Muriqui
- District
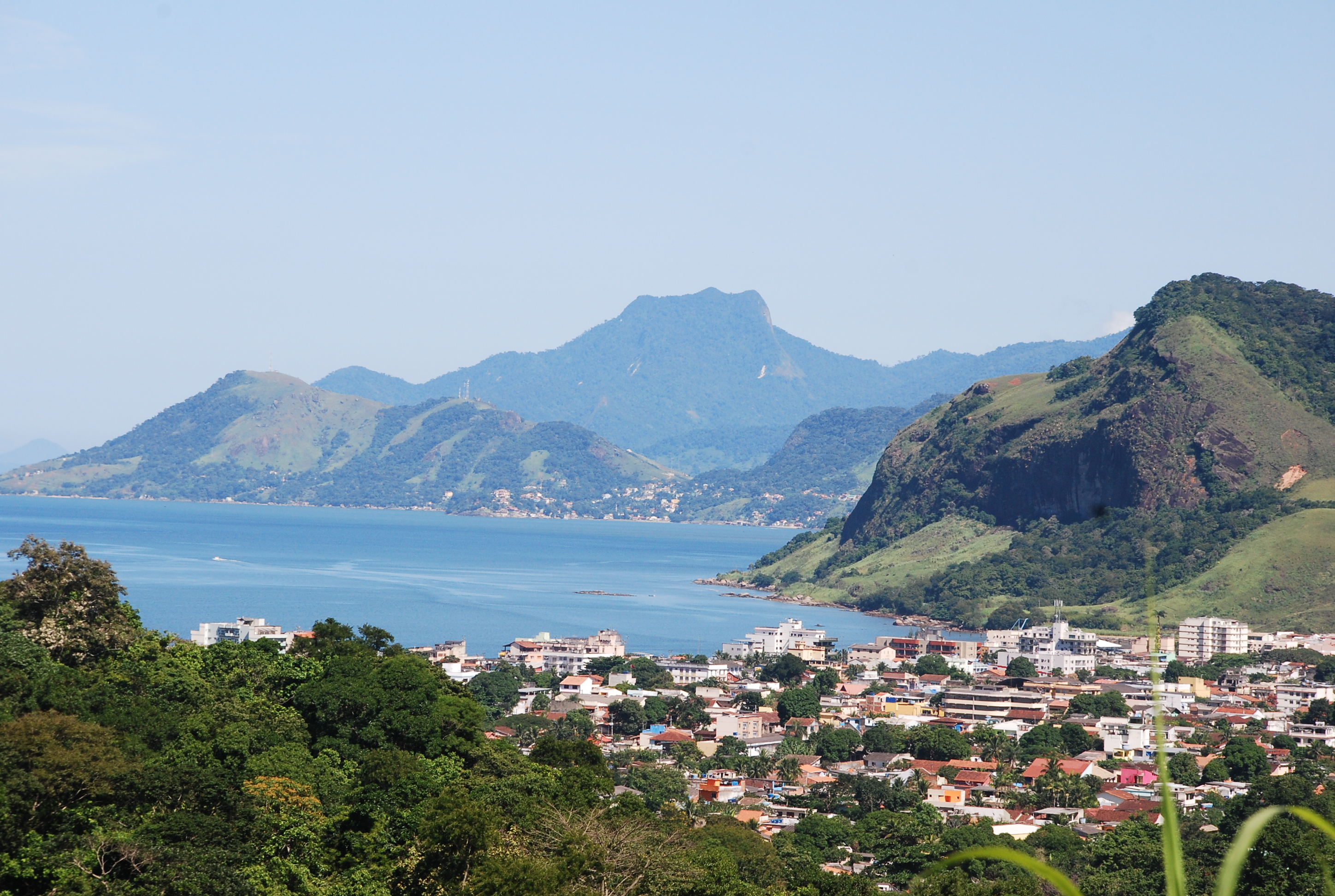
- Panoramic view of Muriqui

- Location in Mangaratiba

- Location in Rio de Janeiro
- Coordinates: 22°55′33.8″S 43°56′52.2″W
- Country: Brazil
- State: Rio de Janeiro
- Municipality/City: Mangaratiba
- Established: c. 1597
- Incorporated (district): 1 December 1949
- Named after: Muriqui spider monkeys

Area
  - Total: 38.0268 km^{2} (14.6822 sq mi)
- (Note: Value given for area is not exact; it was calculated by using the known values for population and population density.)
- Elevation (Posto de Saúde Muriqui): 5 m (16 ft)
- Highest elevation (Serra de Muriqui): 1,226 m (4,022 ft)
- Lowest elevation (Praia de Muriqui): 0 m (0 ft)

Population (2010)
  - Total: 10,241
  - Density: 269.31/km^{2} (697.5/sq mi)
- Demonyms: Vila-muriquiense; muriquiense

Sex ratio (2010)
  - Female: 5,225 (51.02%)
  - Male: 5,016 (48.98%)
- Time zone: UTC−3 (BRT)
- Website: www.mangaratiba.rj.gov.br/novoportal/distritos/muriqui.html

Muriqui (also known as Vila Muriqui) is a district of the municipality of Mangaratiba, located within the Greater Rio de Janeiro, Brazil. It is part of the Green Coast. Highway BR-101 passes through the district.

The district has a patron saint, the Blessed Virgin Mary (Portuguese: Nossa Senhora das Graças). Since the 1950s, the local parish has celebrated annually on the 27th of November, the date Catherine Labouré reportedly had a vision of her in 1830.

== Etymology ==
The district was named after muriquis, a genus of spider monkeys. The name "muriqui" itself comes from a corruption of the word myraqui, of the Tupi language, with the alternates buriqui, barigui and baregui. According to Alcides Pissinatti, in "Management of Muriquis in Captivity" (2005):

Its approximate meaning is "people that swing as they come and go" and it refers particularly to the large, pale brown monkeys that inhabit forests along Brazil's Atlantic coast, initially assigned the scientific name of Ateles hypoxanthus by Wied-Neuwied (1958).

However, according to von Martius' glossary, the word comes from the Tupi words jemoroo ("to nourish"; muru, "nutrient") and aiké (a contraction of aikobê: "to have", "to exist").

== History ==
=== Colonial era ===
Prior to 1567, all land that now belongs to Mangaratiba – including modern-day Muriqui – was part of the freguesia of Angra dos Reis, under the Captaincy of São Vicente. After that date, those lands became part of the (Royal) Captaincy of Rio de Janeiro. In 1568, the colonization of the region of modern-day Mangaratiba begins through the distribution of land to the Sá family.

At some point before 1598 – the year Francisco de Mendonça e Vasconcelos came to Rio de Janeiro to take office as governor – Salvador Correia de Sá finished building a new engenho (the fifth sugarcane mill of Rio de Janeiro). As per the recounting of Anthony Knivet:

[...] the same yeere (1598) there came Francisco de mondunsa de vesconsales (Francisco de Mendonça e Vasconcelos) for Governour to my Masters place, that day the Hulke which the new Governour was in, came to the mouth of the Haven, the Governour Salvador Corea de Sasa (Salvador Correia de Sá) was at a Sugar-mil that he had newly finished.

The engenho was known as Engenho of Saint Gregory (Portuguese: Engenho de São Gregório). According to Vieira de Mello, this engenho was located in Itacuruçá, the district which Muriqui was part of until the middle of the 20th century, and thus later became known as "Engenho of Itacuruçá" (Portuguese: Engenho de Itacuruçá). Additionally, Mirian Bondim claims that this engenho was located in the same place as modern-day Muriqui, and it is referred to by the Mangaratiba town hall as the first construction in Mangaratiba land.

On 8 June 1652, D. Suzana Peixoto and her husband, Dom José Rendon (Note: Both "Rendon" and "Rendom" spellings of the surname can be found.) de Quebedo, exchanged an engenho they owned in Irajá, known as "Engenho Fumaça", for the Engenho of Itacuruçá and some farms in Mangaratiba. Prior to this exchange, the governor of Rio de Janeiro Salvador Correia de Sá e Benevides (son of Martim Correia de Sá and grandson of Salvador Correia de Sá) owned the Engenho of Itacuruçá.

D. Maria de Alarcão e Quebedo (Note: The family name can be found spelled as "Alcarcon" and "Alarcão", and the surname can be found spelled as "Quevedo", "Oquevedo", "Equevedo" and "Quebedo".) inherited the property after the death of Dom José Rendon and, on 17 May 1718, sold it for 600 mil-réis to priest Nicoláo de Siqueira. She donated two thirds of the payment to the local church, "for herself and the souls of all the buried there".

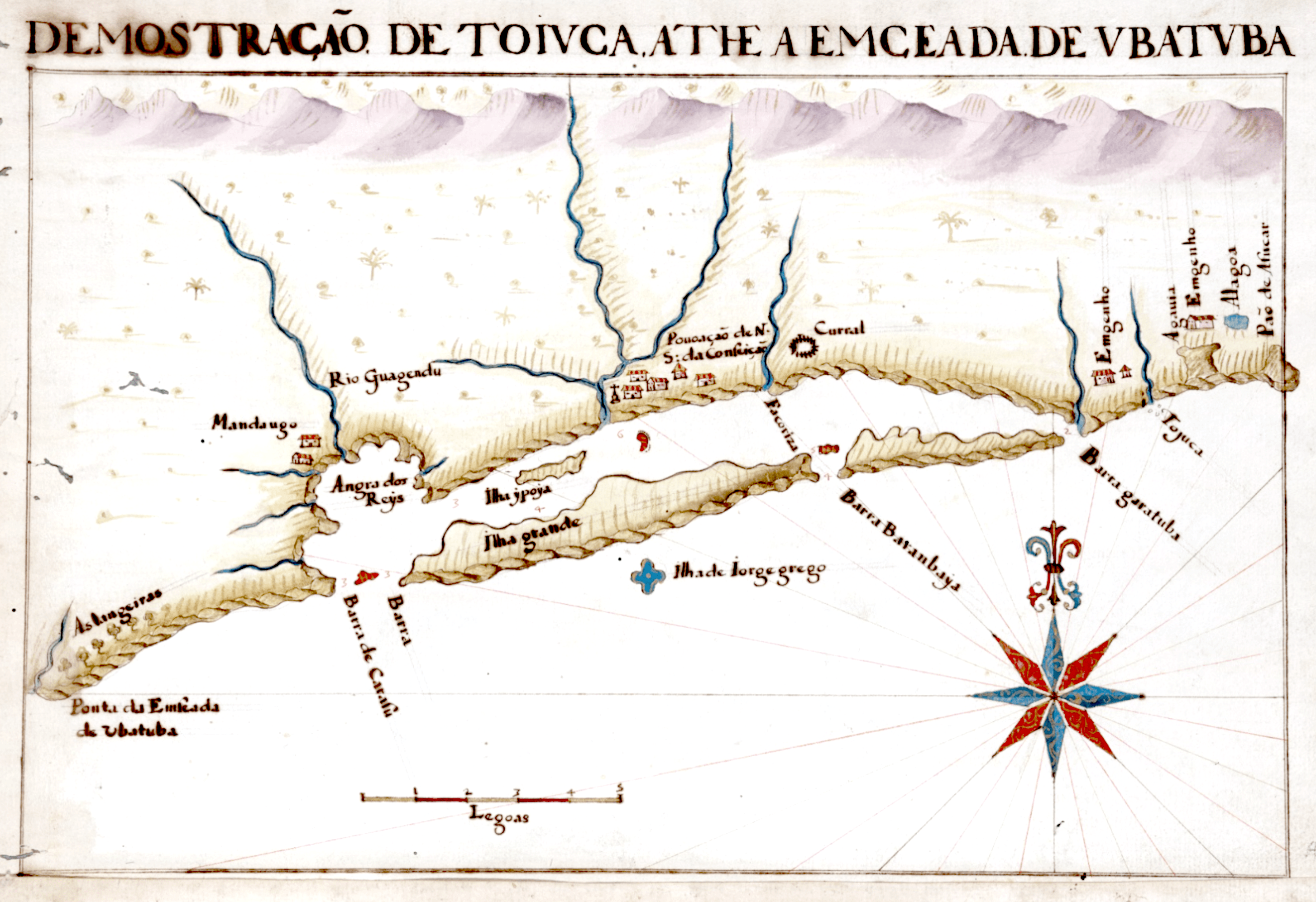
Map of a part of the state of Rio de Janeiro, c. 1666, making no mention of Muriqui.

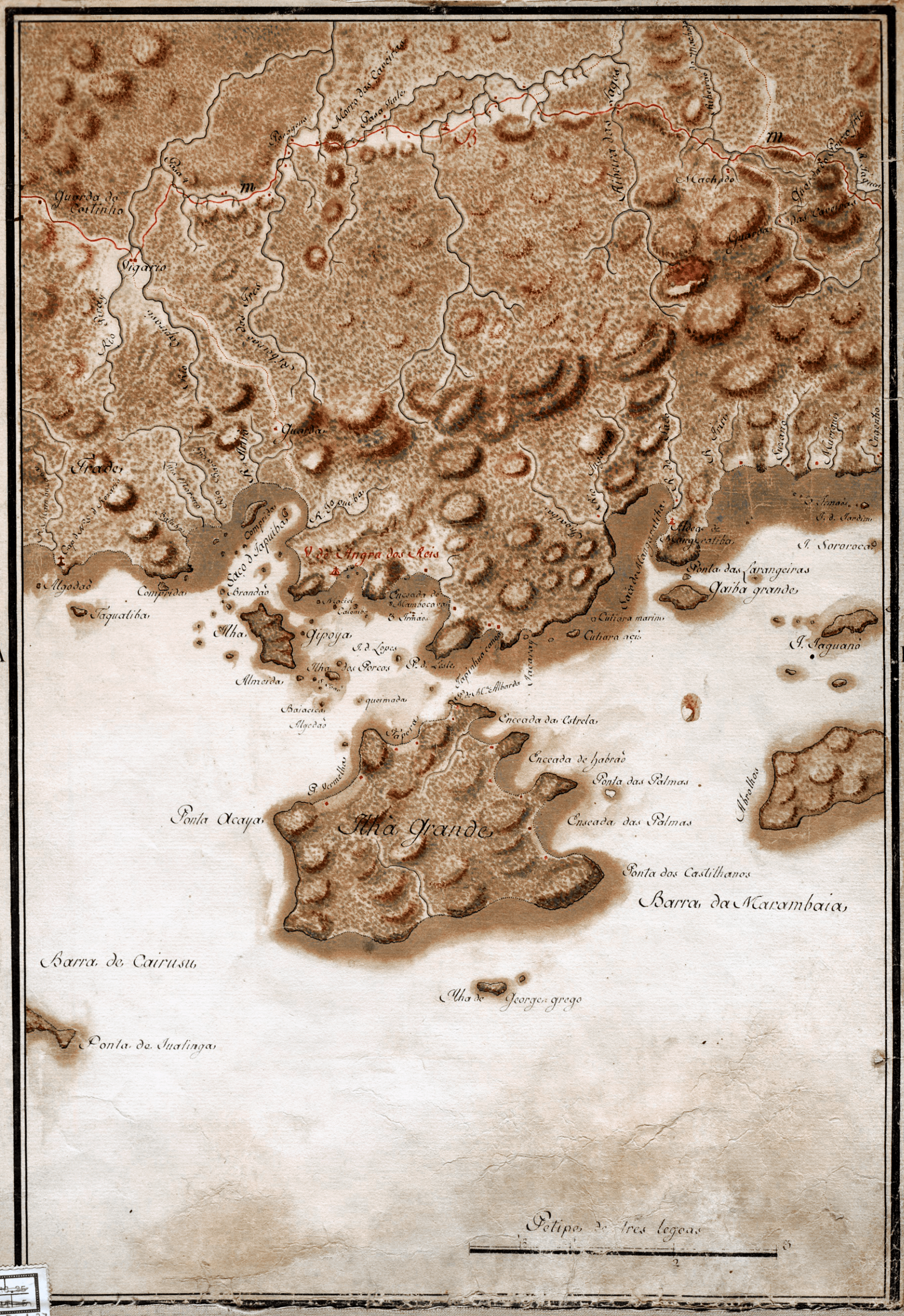
A 1767 map portraying a settlement in Muriqui.

=== Late modern period ===
As a part of a series of expansions to the Central Railway of Brazil (Portuguese: Estrada de Ferro Central do Brasil), on 7 November 1914, the Muriqui train station was inaugurated.

On 1 December 1949, via a legislative decree, the district of vila de Muriqui is delimited on land previously belonging to the district of Itacuruçá, and annexed to the municipality of Mangaratiba.

== Population ==
Population pyramid 2010
%	Males	Age	Females	%
0.19		85+		0.43
0.47		80–84		0.61
0.69		75–79		0.87
1.29		70–74		1.35
1.98		65–69		1.79
2.42		60–64		2.64
2.50		55–59		2.74
3.23		50–54		3.41
3.13		45–49		3.82
3.42		40–44		3.46
3.50		35–39		3.91
3.93		30–34		3.89
3.67		25–29		3.97
3.68		20–24		3.40
3.71		15–19		4.22
4.82		10–14		3.97
3.36		5–9		3.48
2.98		0–4		3.09

Population census
Year	Pop.	±%
1950	983	—
1960	1,885	+91.8%
1970	2,366	+25.5%
1980	3,380	+42.9%
1991	4,345	+28.6%
2000	6,095	+40.3%
2010	10,241	+68.0%
Note: The 1940's census contains no reference to Vila Muriqui, as Muriqui only officially became a district in 1949. Source: IBGE

== Administration ==
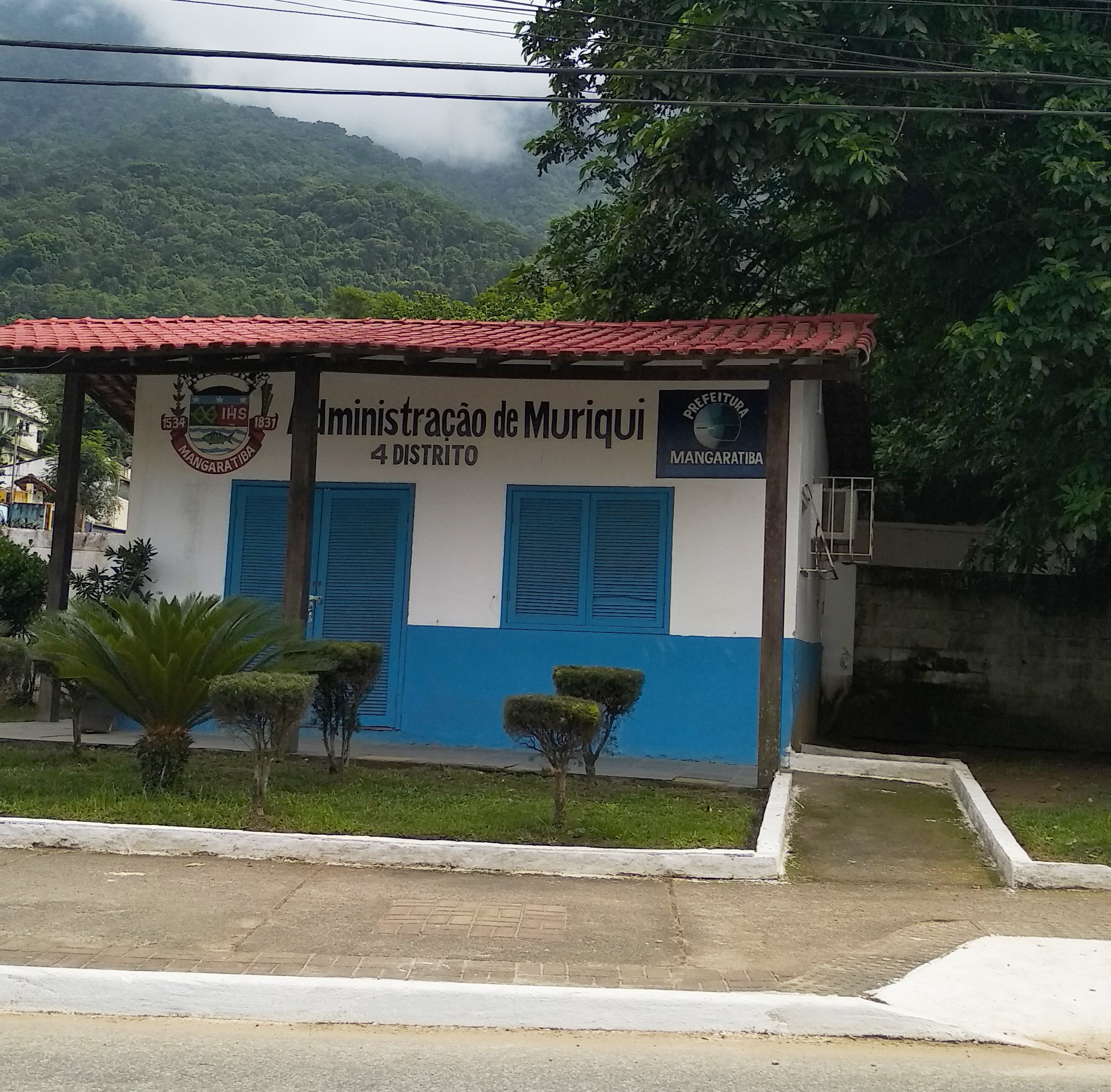
Muriqui's administrative office

Being a district of the larger municipality of Mangaratiba, Muriqui is subject to the administration of Mangaratiba's prefecture – i.e. its mayor and municipal government. However, a subprefecture dedicated exclusively to Muriqui exists.

The following is a list of heads ("subprefeitos") of the subprefecture of Muriqui:

Heads of the subprefecture of Muriqui
Name	Nominated	Exonerated	Duration
Demócrito Reginaldo	1 August 2011	?	?
Demócrito Reginaldo	1 February 2013	1 May 2015	2 years and 3 months
Antônio Marcos de Moura	1 February 2017	1 July 2018	1 year and 5 months
Adilson dos Santos	1 August 2018	?	?
Fabrícia Guerhardt	20 November 2018	1 April 2019	4 months and 12 days
Adilson dos Santos	1 April 2019	2 January 2020	9 months and 1 day

== Fauna and flora ==
Muriqui is surrounded mostly by Atlantic Forest, which heavily influences its fauna and flora.

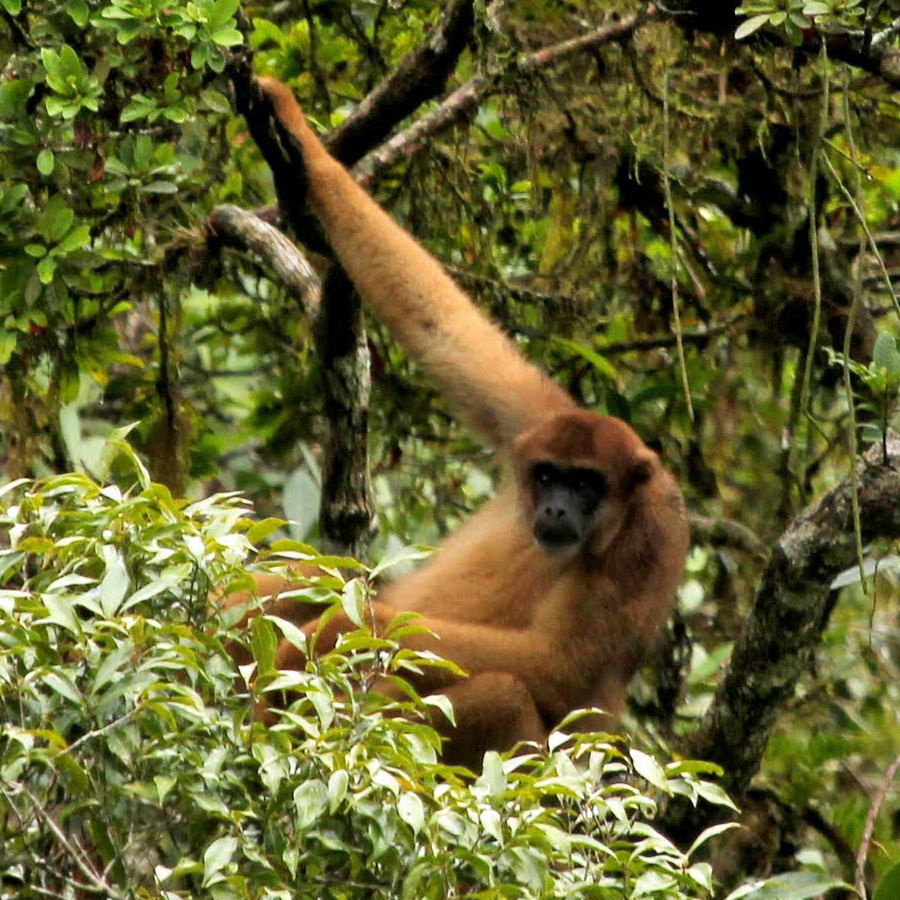
The southern muriqui (Brachyteles arachnoides), after which the district is named

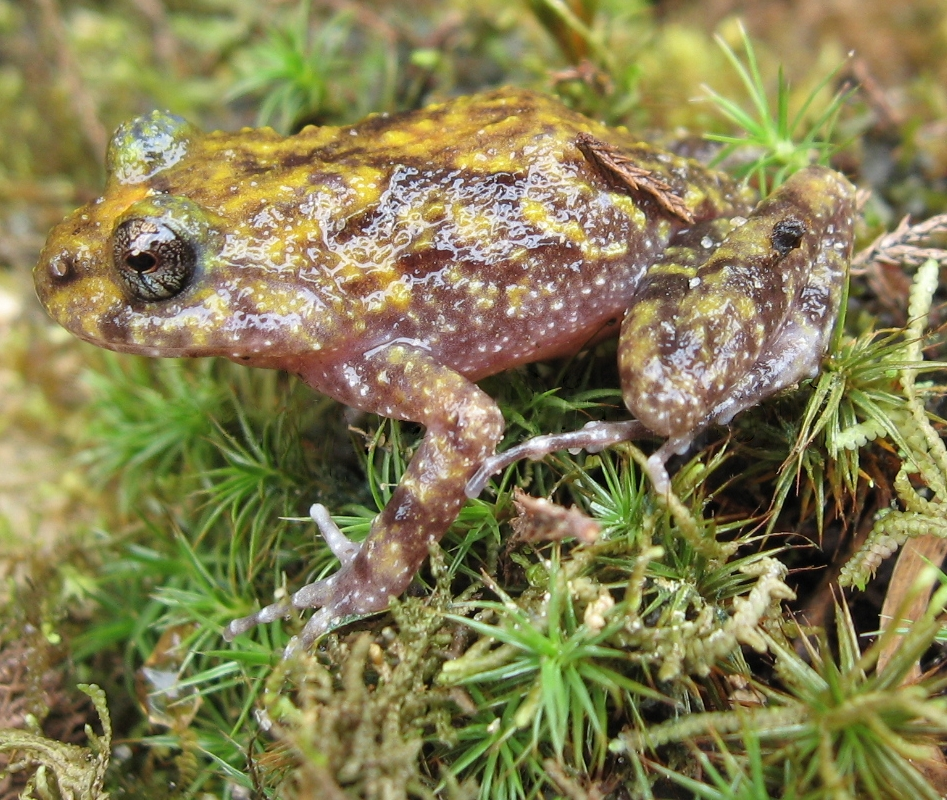
Cycloramphus eleutherodactylus

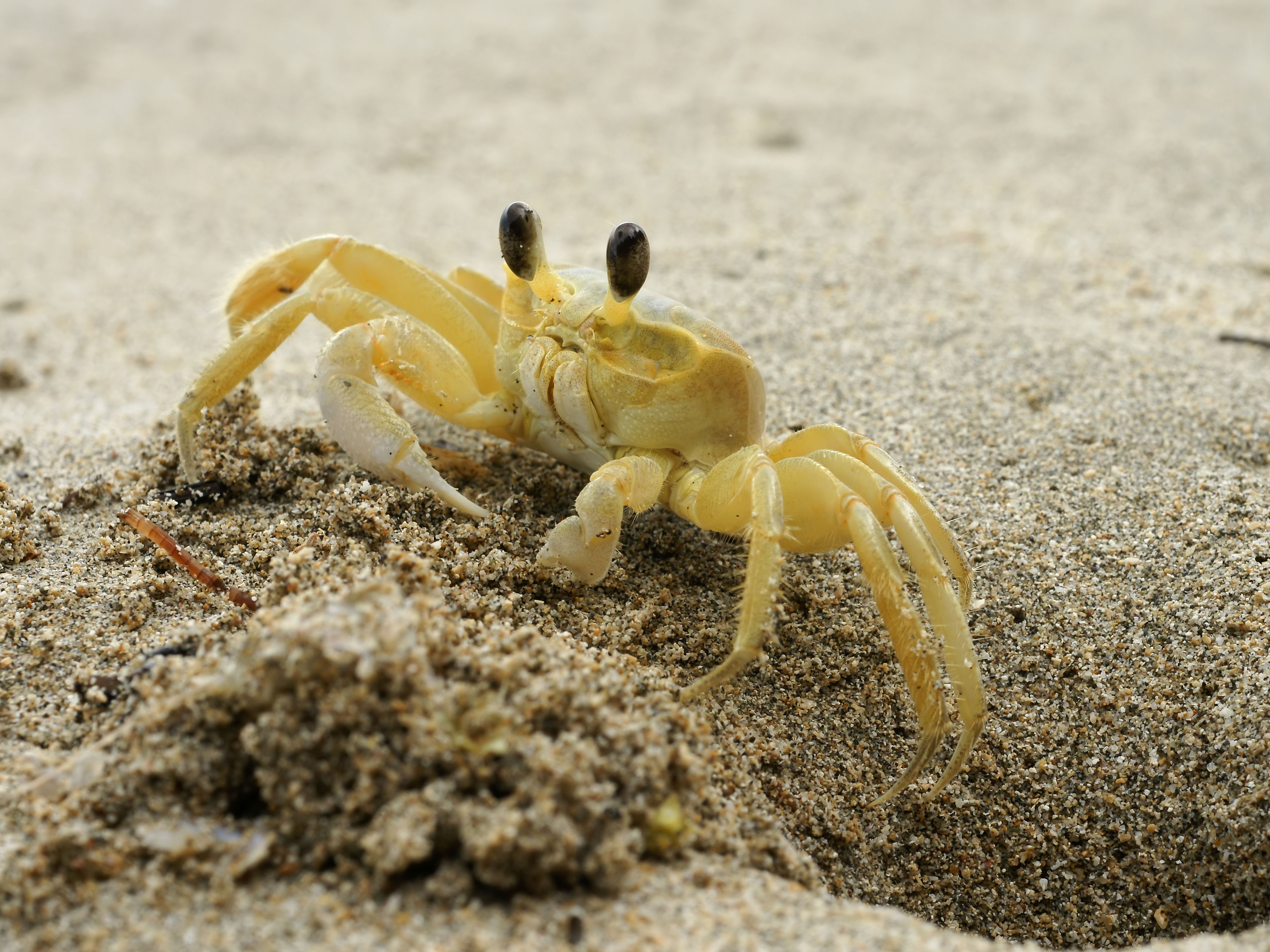
Atlantic ghost crab (Ocypode albicans), known as "maria farinha" (lit. "flour Mary")

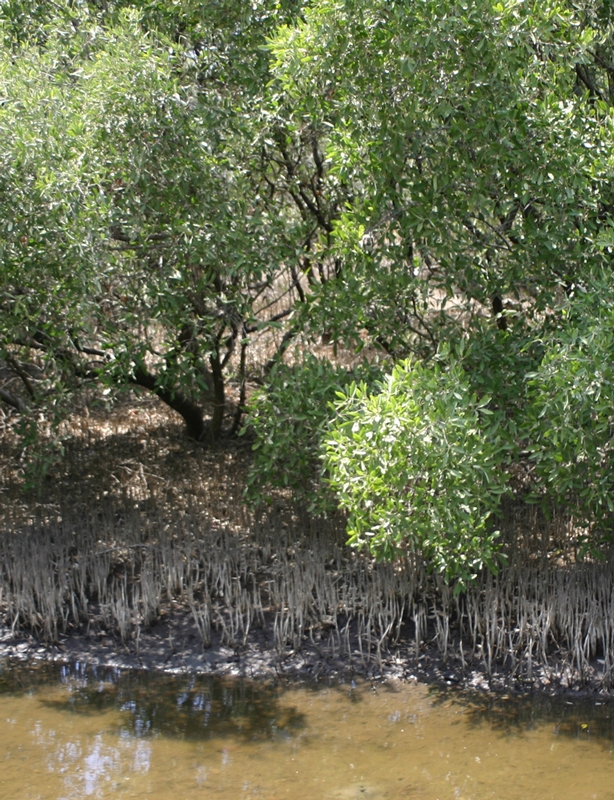
Black mangrove (Avicennia germinans), known as "sereíba"

== Hydrography ==
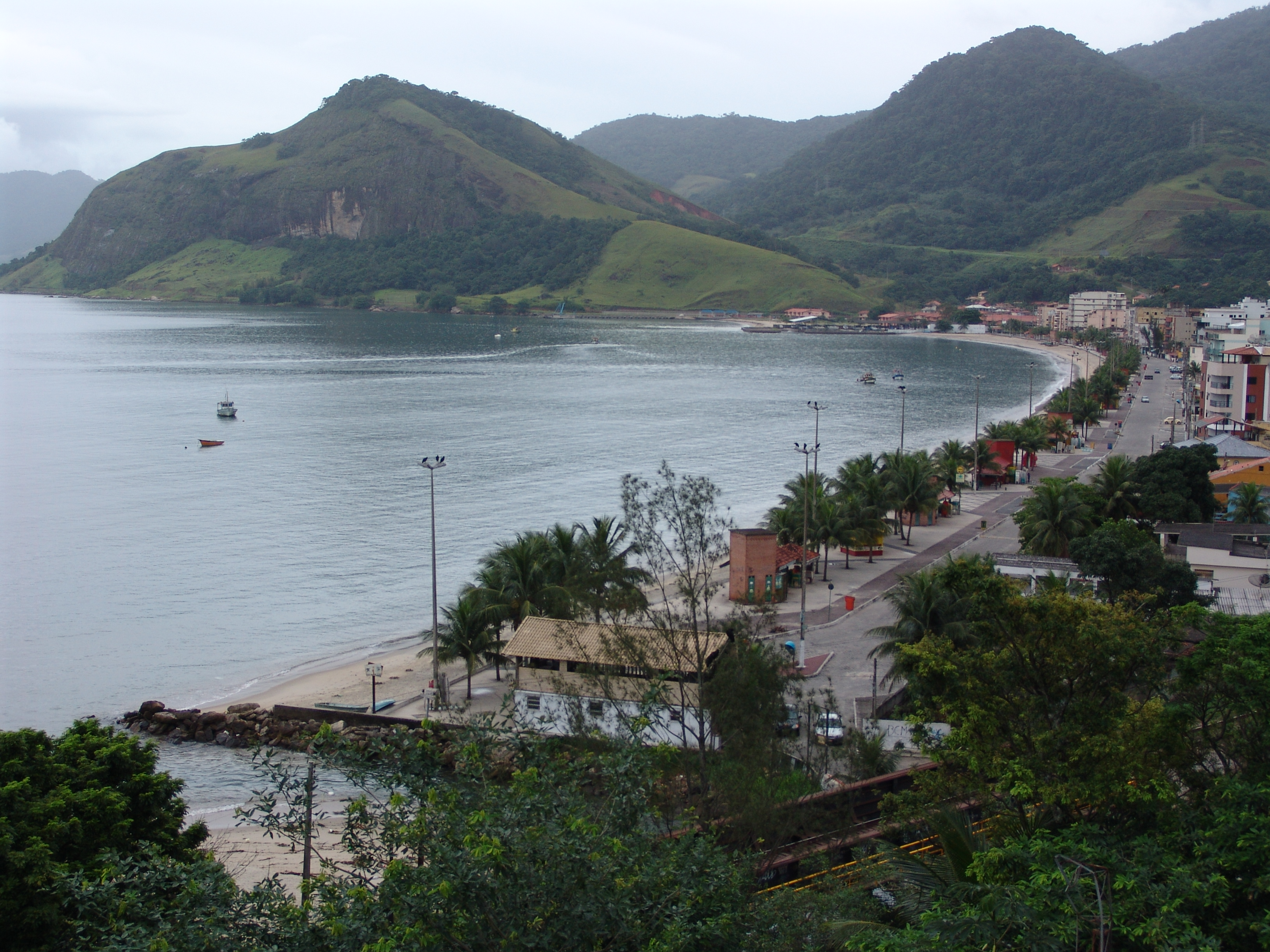
View of the Muriqui beach

=== Beaches ===
Muriqui has direct access to the Atlantic Ocean through the Muriqui beach (Portuguese: Praia de Muriqui), located to the west of Sepetiba Bay (Portuguese: Baía de Sepetiba). In terms of balneability, the Muriqui beach has been mostly deemed improper for bathing, although there have been recent efforts in an attempt to clean Mangaratiba rivers and beaches.

=== Rivers ===
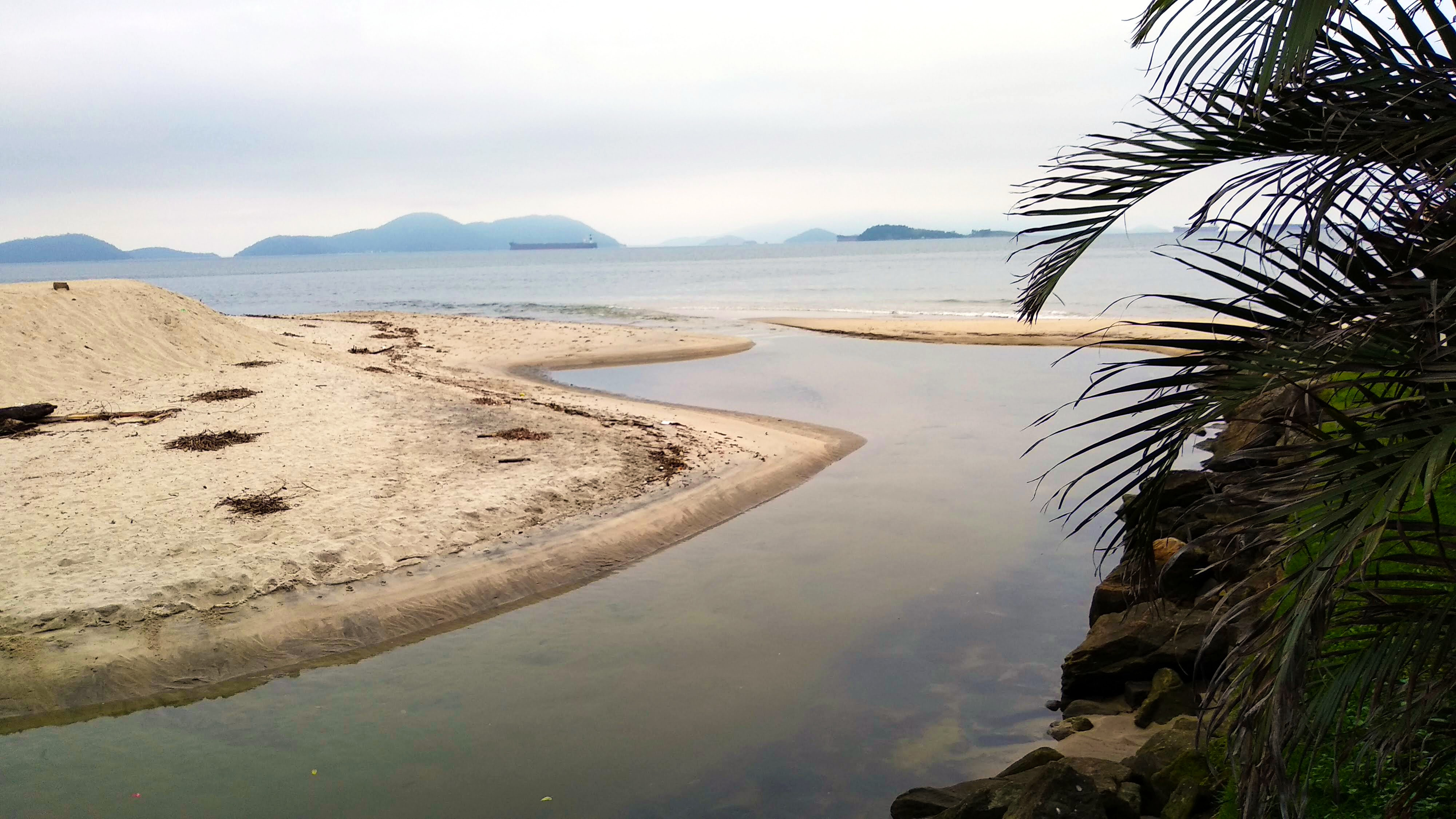
Rio Catumbi's estuary.

Muriqui is centered between two rivers, with Rio Catumbi to the east and Rio Muriqui (sometimes called Rio da Prata) to the west.

To mitigate the risk of flooding, both rivers are periodically dredged by the district's subprefecture.

== Culture ==
=== Art ===
Muriqui is home to an art installation by Japanese artist Mariko Mori called Ring: One With Nature, inaugurated atop the Bride's Veil (Portuguese: Véu da Noiva) waterfall in August 2016 to celebrate the 2016 Summer Olympics. The piece is an acrylic ring that changes in color depending on the position of the sun, and is meant as a representation of a sixth Olympic ring. It measures about 3 metres (9.8 ft) in diameter and weighs around 2 tonnes (4,400 lb).

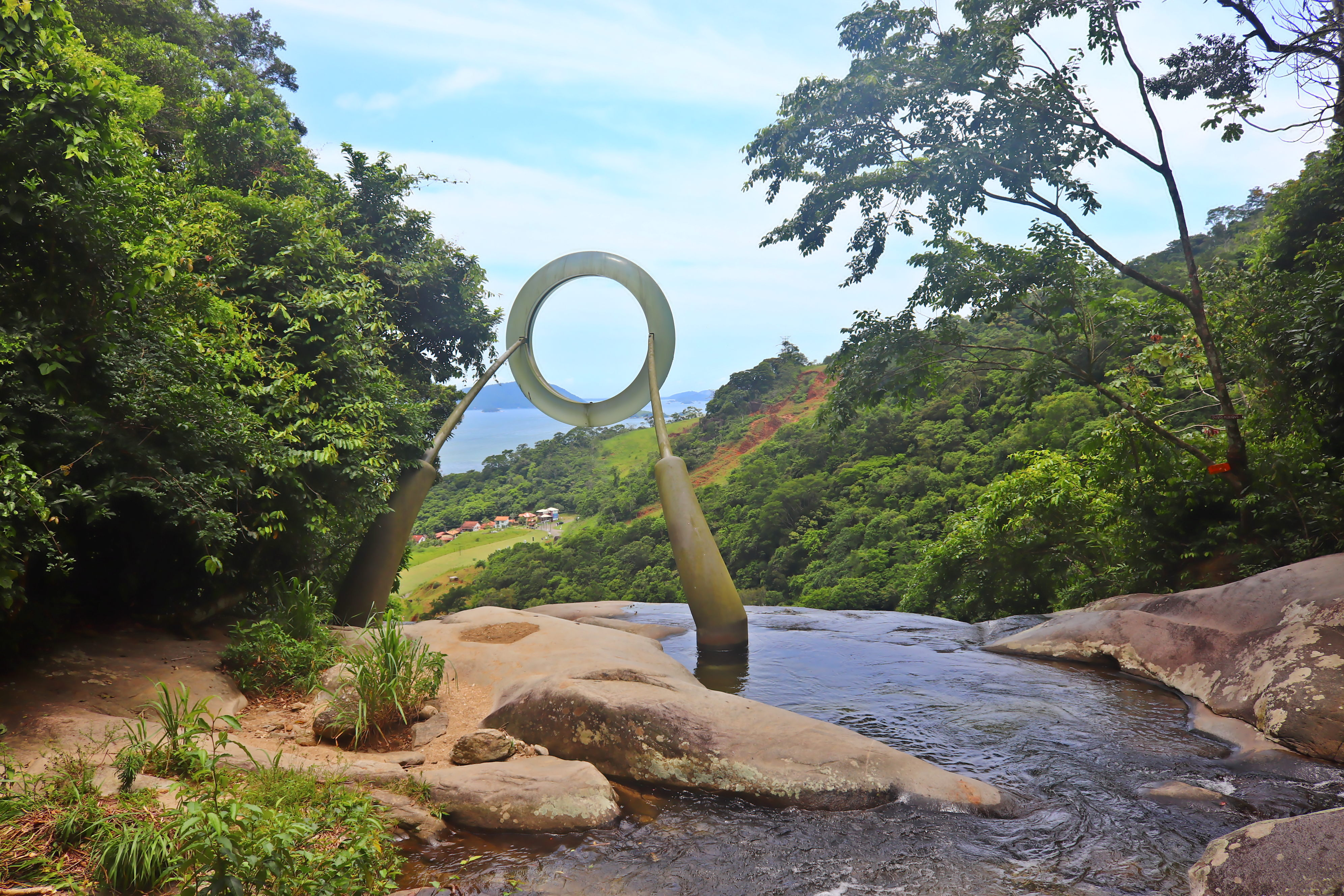
View of the art installation from atop the Bride's Veil waterfall.

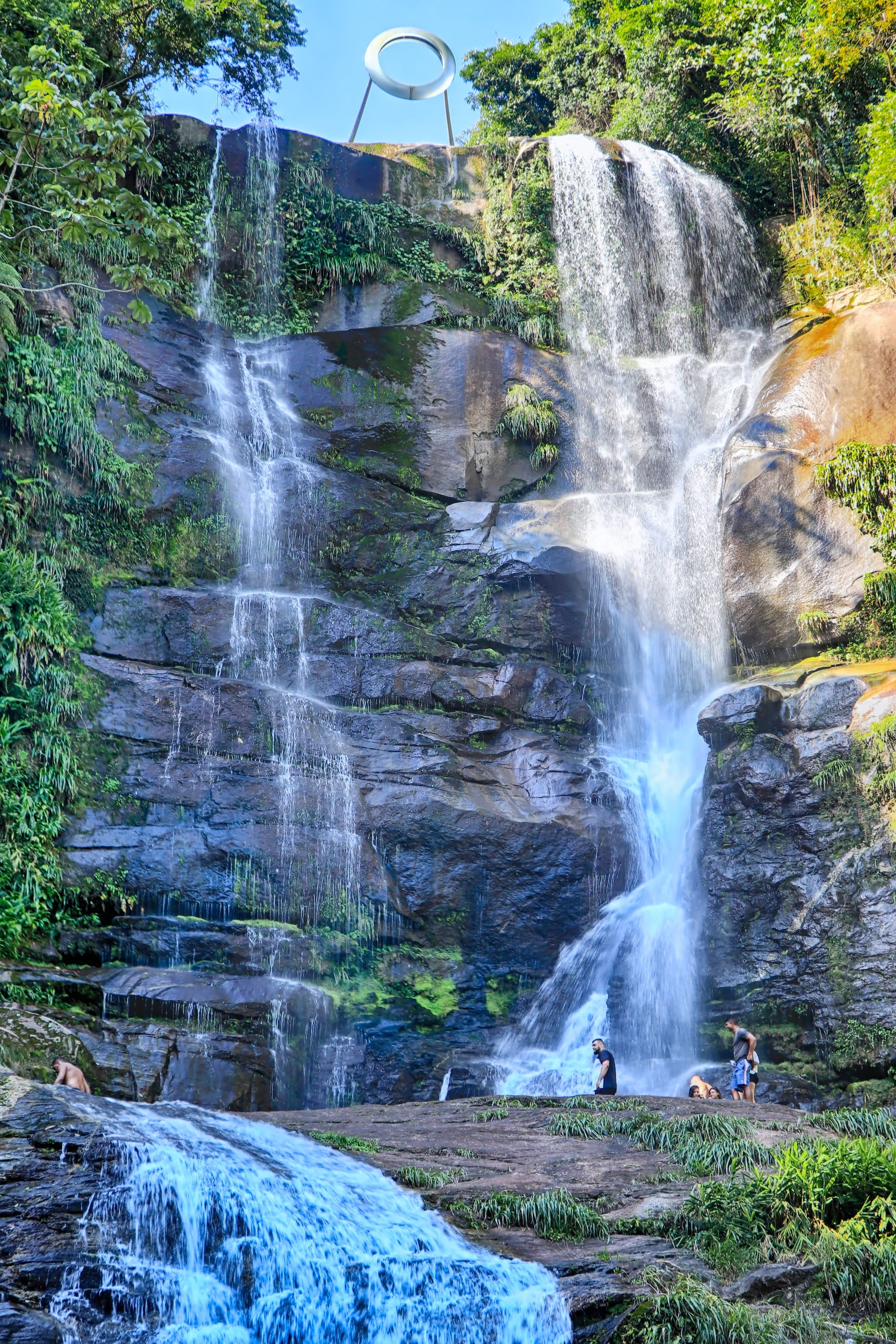
View of the art installation from the base of the waterfall.

=== Cuisine ===
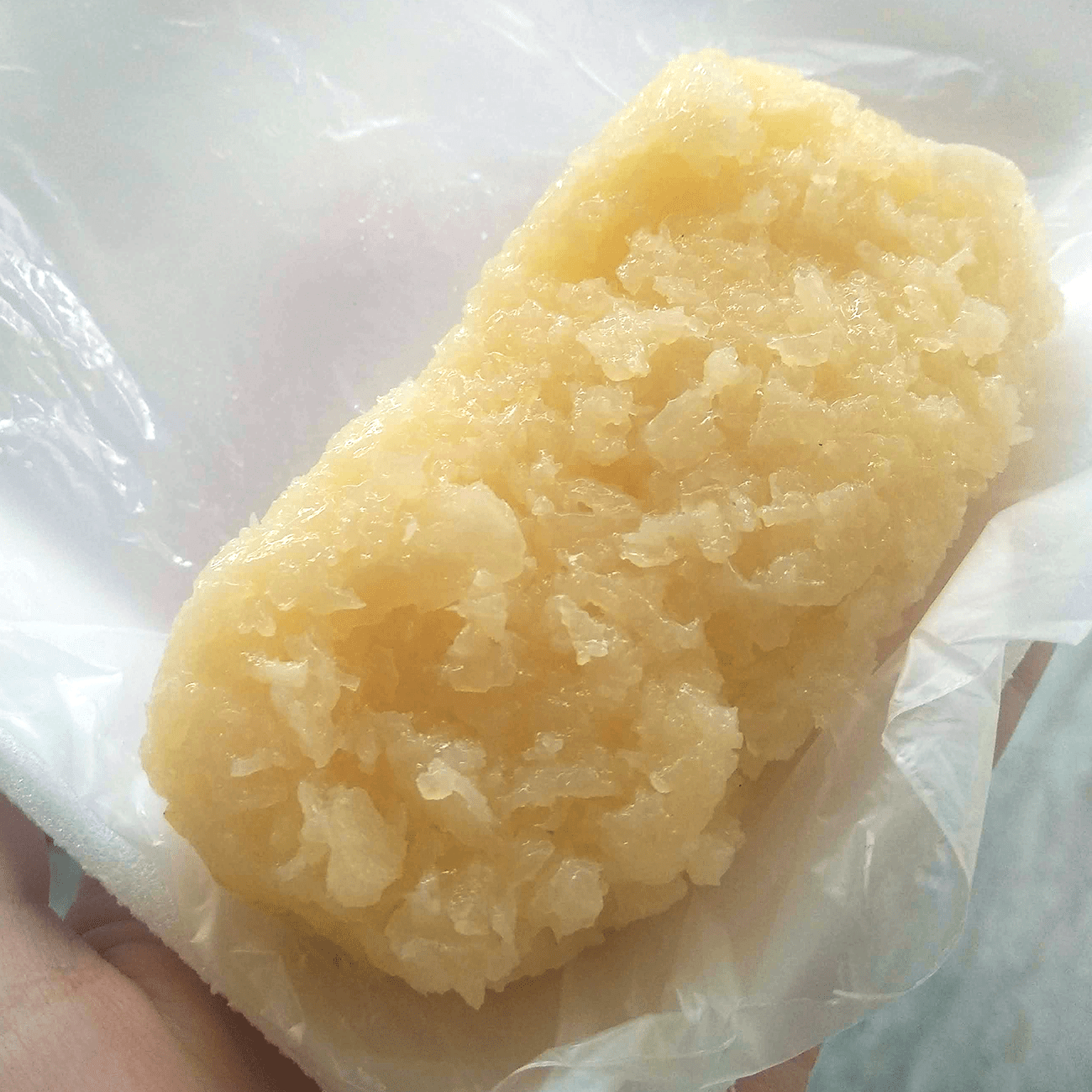
A cocada of Muriqui.

Muriqui's most well known delicacy is the cocada (known as Cocada de Muriqui), deemed to be one of the famous sweets of the Mangaratiba cuisine. According to Fabrini dos Santos, a SEBRAE consultant, the cocadas are distinctive enough that they could, at some point, be granted a geographical indication. The district's cocada has existed at least since the construction of the BR-101 highway, and has been sold on its shoulders ever since.

The coconut-based dessert has had such a cultural impact that, in March 2018, the "Cocada Party of Muriqui" (Portuguese: Festa da Cocada do Distrito de Muriqui) was added to the municipality's official event calendar, to be celebrated annually on the last weekend of the month of July.

=== Folklore ===
Muriqui has its own folklore, limited to the region, and separate from the national-level folklore.

The story of the "Vieira Wind" (Portuguese: Vento Vieira) is part of the oral tradition of the district. The tale is usually related to the high-speed winds in the area during winter (roughly in the period from the end of August to the start of September).

According to the Brazilian Archaeology Institute (Portuguese: Instituto de Arqueologia Brasileira, shortened IAB), there are two different versions of the story. The first and more common one, which has been retold by Mangaratiba's official culture manager Fundação Mario Peixoto, was described by local newspaper Jornal Litoral in 2015 as follows:

Entre Agosto e Setembro existe um vento forte que os pioneiros habitantes chamaram de Vieira, que segundo a lenda, este morador de Muriqui, pouco antes de morrer, pediu para ser enterrado nas belas montanhas. E quando o mesmo faleceu, os amigos levaram o corpo no caixão para enterrá-lo sem ser nas montanhas. No momento em que vão colocá-lo na sepultura, começou a ventar muito forte, e os amigos com medo, deixaram o caixão e foram para suas casas. No dia seguinte, ao parar o vento voltaram para acabar o enterro, e lá chegando encontraram o caixão vazio. A partir daquele dia todos acreditaram que o vento havia levado o corpo de "VIEIRA" para as montanhas e como não foi enterrado, volta todos os anos para visitar Muriqui, local que ele muito gostava.

Translation:

Between August and September, there is a very strong wind that the inhabitant pioneers called Vieira. According to the lore, this Muriqui resident, on his deathbed, asked to be buried in the beautiful mountains. When he died, his friends took the body in a coffin to be buried, but not on the mountains. In the middle of the burial, strong winds started blowing, so the friends left the coffin and went to their homes, in fear. The next day, after the wind had stopped, they went back to the burial site to find an empty coffin. From that day on, everyone believed that the wind had taken "VIEIRA"'s body to the mountains and, as he wasn't buried, he comes back every year to visit Muriqui, a place he much liked.

The second version, arguably more grounded in reality, although less common, is as follows:

Um corpo estava sendo velado quando, lá pela madrugada, veio uma ventania tão forte que derrubou o caixão de cima da mesa. O morto, que se chamava Vieira, rolou pelo chão. Duro que nem pedra pesava mais que vivo. Foi uma dificuldade para colocá-lo no caixão. A partir desse dia, apelidaram o vento de "Vieira".

Translation:

A body was lying in repose when, at dawn, strong winds started blowing and knocked the coffin on the floor. The deceased, whose name was Vieira, tumbled on the floor. Hard as a rock, he weighed more than the living. It was hard to put him in the coffin. From this day forward, the wind was nicknamed "Vieira".

== Sport ==
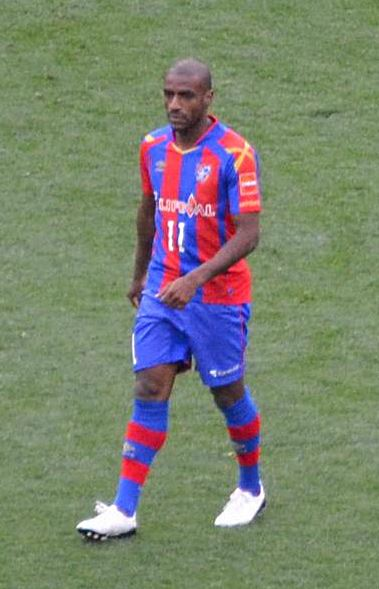
Muriqui at Ajinomoto Stadium in 2016

Muriqui is the birthplace of a proeminent football player, Luiz Guilherme Silva, nicknamed Muriqui himself. As of October 2020, he plays for Chinese Super League club Cangzhou Mighty Lions. In 2018, he was elected the sixth most influential football player in China's history.

Muriqui is also home to its own football club, Muriqui Football Club – along with the Muriqui Football Club Stadium (Portuguese: Estádio do Muriqui Futebol Clube). Among other events, it hosts the Municipal Veterans Championship (Portuguese: Campeonato Municipal de Veteranos).

== Notable people ==
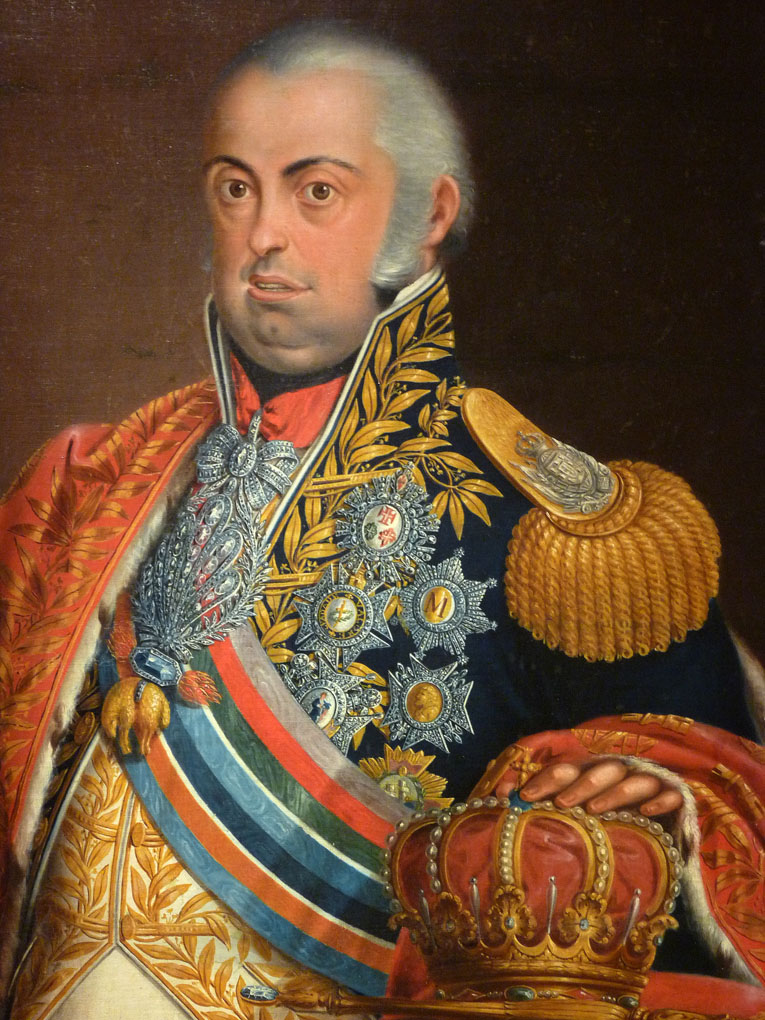
Painting by José Leandro de Carvalho of king D. João VI, c. 1818

This is a non-exhaustive list of notable people born in Muriqui:

- José Leandro de Carvalho (c. 1770–1834), painter
- Luiz Guilherme Silva (1986–), footballer

== Bibliography ==
- "Recenseamento Geral de 1950 – Série Regional" [General Recensus of 1950 – Regional Series]. Censo Demográfico (in Brazilian Portuguese). Vol. 23, no. 1. Rio de Janeiro: IBGE. August 1955. p. 94. ISSN 0104-3145.
- "VII Recenseamento Geral do Brasil – 1960" [VII General Recensus of Brazil – 1960]. Censo Demográfico (in Brazilian Portuguese). Rio de Janeiro: IBGE. August 1961. p. 7. ISSN 0104-057X.
- "VIII Recenseamento Geral – 1970 – Série Regional" [VIII General Recensus – 1970 – Regional Series]. Censo Demográfico (in Brazilian Portuguese). Vol. 1, no. 16. Rio de Janeiro: IBGE. June 1973. ISSN 0104-3145.
- "IX Recenseamento Geral do Brasil – 1980 – Dados Distritais" [IX General Recensus of Brazil – 1980 – District Data]. Censo Demográfico (in Brazilian Portuguese). Vol. 1, no. 16. Rio de Janeiro: IBGE. 1983. ISSN 0104-3145.
- "Resultados do universo relativos às características da população e dos domicílios" [Universe results in relation to population and residence characteristics]. Censo Demográfico (in Brazilian Portuguese). No. 20. Rio de Janeiro: IBGE. 1991. ISSN 0104-3145.
- "Estudo Socioeconômico 2003 – Mangaratiba" [Socioeconomic Study 2003 – Mangaratiba]. Estudos Socioeconômicos dos Municípios do Estado do Rio de Janeiro (in Brazilian Portuguese). Rio de Janeiro: Tribunal de Contas do Estado do Rio de Janeiro. October 2003.
- "Estudos Socioeconômicos dos Municípios do Estado do Rio de Janeiro – Mangaratiba" [Socioeconomic Studies of the Municipalities of the State of Rio de Janeiro – Mangaratiba]. Estudos Socioeconômicos dos Municípios do Estado do Rio de Janeiro (in Brazilian Portuguese). Rio de Janeiro: Tribunal de Contas do Estado do Rio de Janeiro. December 2011.
- "Histórico dos Boletins Semanais das Praias da Costa Verde - 2013" [History of Weekly Reports of Green Coast Beaches - 2013] (PDF) (in Brazilian Portuguese). INEA. 2013.
- "Histórico dos Boletins das Praias da Costa Verde - 2014" [History of Reports of Green Coast Beaches - 2014] (PDF) (in Brazilian Portuguese). INEA. 2014.
- "Histórico dos Boletins de Balneabilidade das Praias da Costa Verde - 2015" [History of Reports of the Balneability of Green Coast Beaches - 2015] (PDF) (in Brazilian Portuguese). INEA. 2015.
- "Histórico dos Boletins de Balneabilidade das Praias da Costa Verde - 2016" [History of Reports of the Balneability of Green Coast Beaches - 2016] (PDF) (in Brazilian Portuguese). INEA. 2016.
- "Histórico dos Boletins de Balneabilidade das Praias da Costa Verde - 2017" [History of Reports of the Balneability of Green Coast Beaches - 2017] (PDF) (in Brazilian Portuguese). INEA. 2017.
- "Histórico dos Boletins de Balneabilidade das Praias da Costa Verde - 2018" [History of Reports of the Balneability of Green Coast Beaches - 2018] (PDF) (in Brazilian Portuguese). INEA. 2018.
- "Qualificação Anual Histórica das Praias da Costa Verde - Resultados de Bacteriologia Consolidados" [Historical Annual Qualification of Green Coast Beaches - Consolidated Results of Bacteriology] (PDF) (in Brazilian Portuguese). INEA.
