= Requeijão =

Whey cheese popular in Portugal and Brazil

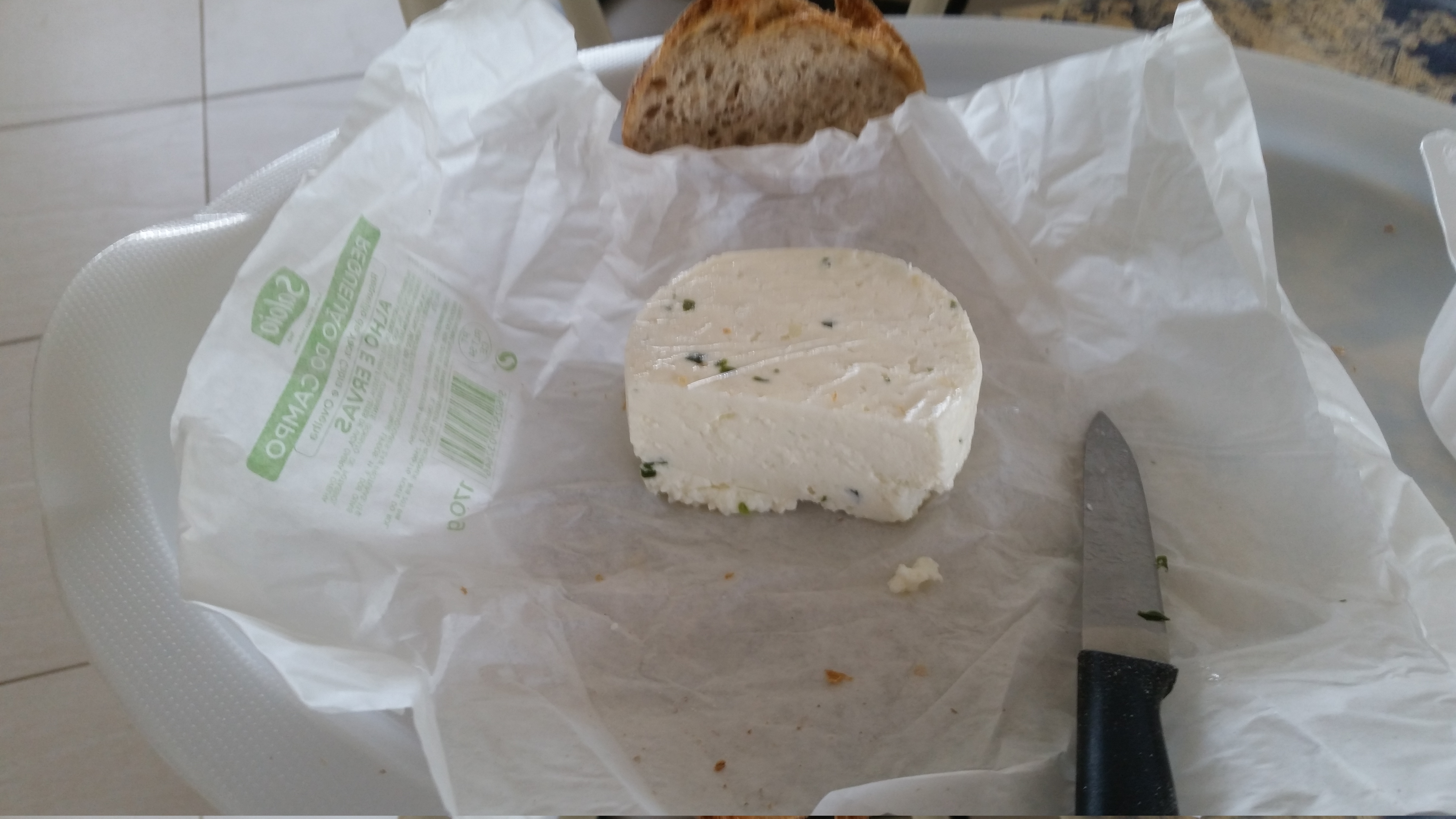
- Portuguese requeijão
- Country of origin: Portugal; Brazil
- Source of milk: Cow, goat and sheep
- Pasteurized: Depends on variety
- Texture: Solid to creamy
- Aging time: Depends on variety
- Certification: No

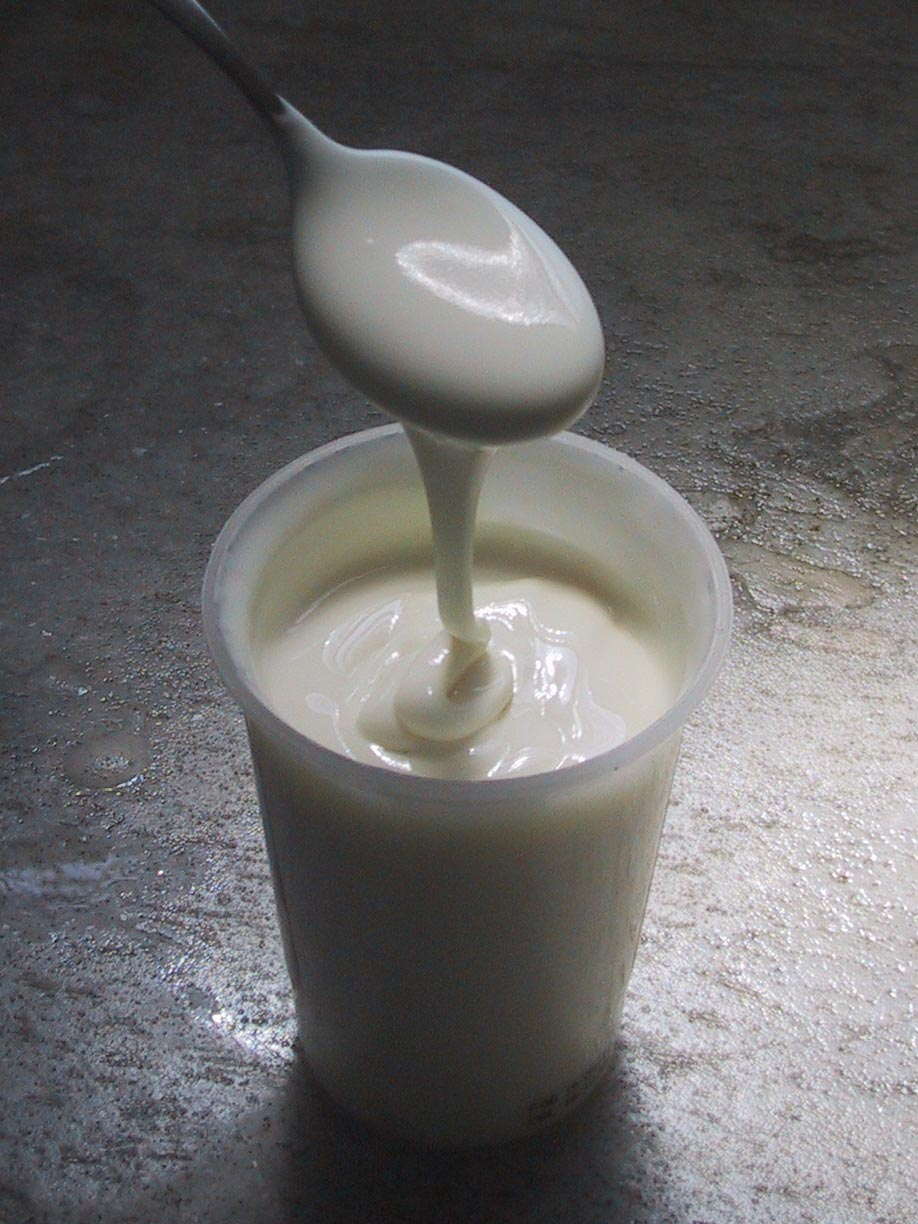
Brazilian requeijão

Requeijão (/rəkeɪˈʒaʊn/ rə-kay-ZHOWN; Portuguese pronunciation: [ʁe.kejˈʒɐ̃w̃]) is a whey cheese produced in Portugal and Brazil. It is similar to ricotta and is used to make cheese spreads and as an ingredient in some pastries, such as queijada.

== Portugal ==
=== Requeijão da Serra da Estrela ===
The requeijão made in the Serra da Estrela region of Portugal, Requeijão da Serra da Estrela has been a protected designation of origin (PDO) since 2005 in the EU and the UK.

== Brazil ==
=== Requeijão cremoso ===
In Brazil requeijão commonly refers to requeijão cremoso, a spreadable processed cheese made from emulsifying curds from skimmed or whole milk with a fat such as cream, milkfat, or butter.
