= Cocada =

Traditional coconut confection found in Latin America

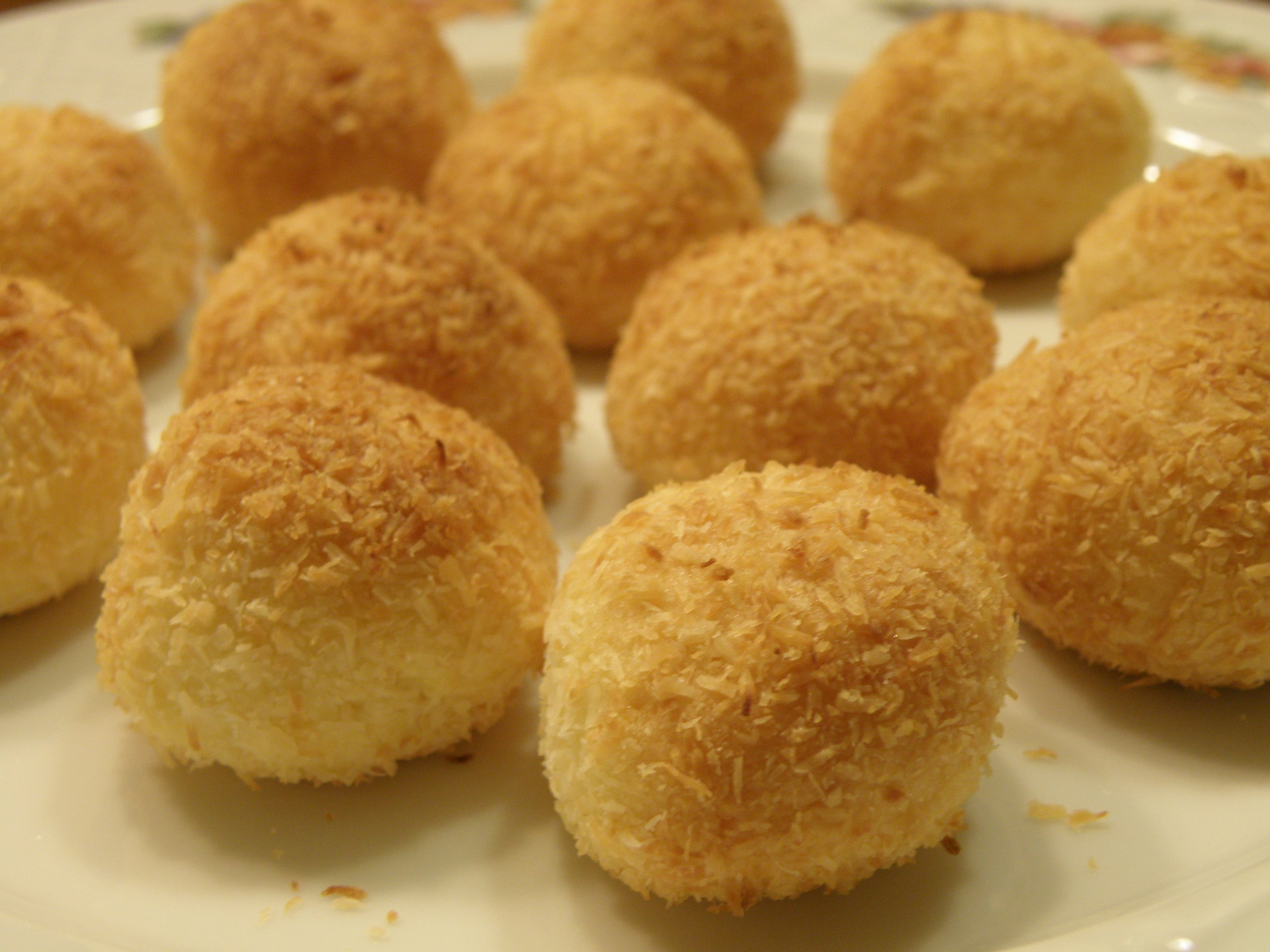
- Cocadas from Ferrol, Spain.
- Type: Confectionery
- Region or state: Latin America, Iberian Peninsula
- Associated cuisine: Spain, Argentina, Bolivia, Brazil, Colombia, Chile, Dominican Republic, Mexico, Panama, Venezuela, Ecuador, Goa .
- Serving temperature: Room temperature
- Main ingredients: Eggs, shredded coconut, food coloring, sugar, brown sugar, coconut milk, condensed milk, fruit syrup

Cocada are a traditional coconut confectionery found in many parts of Latin America and Europe. They are particularly popular in Argentina, Bolivia, Brazil, Colombia, Chile, the Dominican Republic, Cuba, Spain, Mexico, Panama, Venezuela, Ecuador, and also in the former Estado da Índia Portuguesa.

They are oven baked but are served at room temperature to provide their chewy and soft texture. Made with eggs and shredded coconut, cocadas come in a variety of colors due to the modern use of food coloring, however the traditional variations are golden brown. They are often garnished with almonds, either whole or chopped. There are hundreds of cocadas recipes, from the typical hard, very sweet balls to cocadas that are almost the creamy texture of flan. Other fruit, often dried, can be added to the cocadas to create variety, which will also lend to a wide spectrum of cocada colors. Cocadas are mentioned as early as 1878 in Peru.

== By country ==
=== Mexico, Colombia and Uruguay ===
In Colombia and Mexico, Conserva de coco are sold not only as artisan candies from shops, but commonly on the streets, out of baskets, and particularly on the beaches, by men or women who carry them on large aluminum trays. In Uruguay, they are commonly sold in bakeries under the name of coquitos, the more delicate versions include a cherry on the top and syrup coating, sometimes they fill the boxes of assorted masas.

=== Brazil ===
In Brazil, cocada are a traditional confectionery originating from the north-east of the country. They are often long and thin rather than round, and are sold in the streets.

One variation of cocada in Brazil is the "black cocada" (Portuguese: Cocada preta) made with brown sugar and slightly burnt coconut. In Brazil, "rei da cocada preta" (black cocada king) is used to refer to an arrogant person who thinks too highly of himself.

Although similar, cocadas and queijadinhas are not the same thing. The cocada is usually made from coconut and sugar only, rolled together to form an amorphous mass. Queijadinha is made with more ingredients, and gets its shape from the baking tin.

=== Venezuela ===
In Venezuela, conserva de coco is a candy and cocada is a drink blended with coconut and the confectionery or candy form is called "conserva de coco".

== Gallery ==
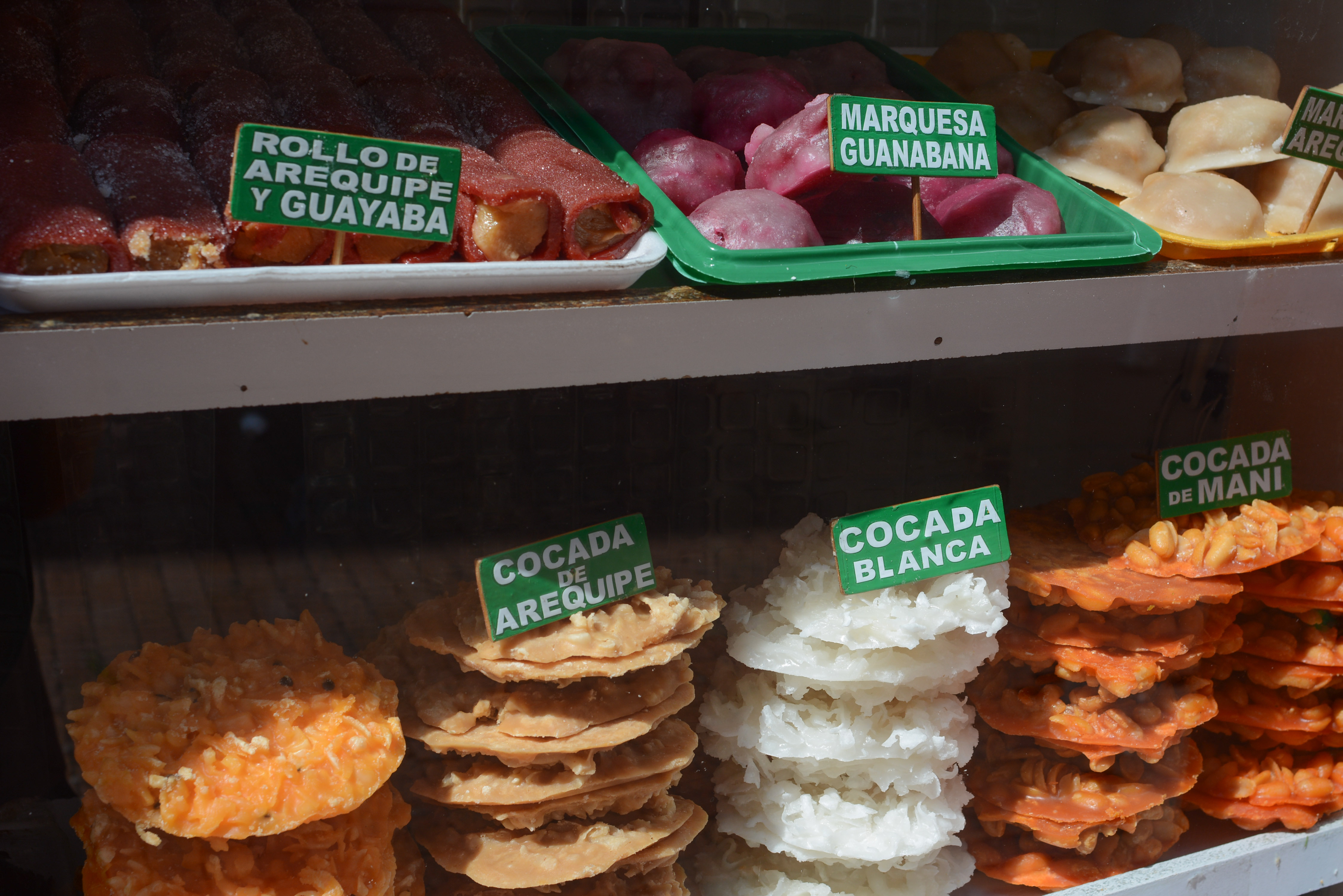
Cocadas of Bogotá, Colombia.

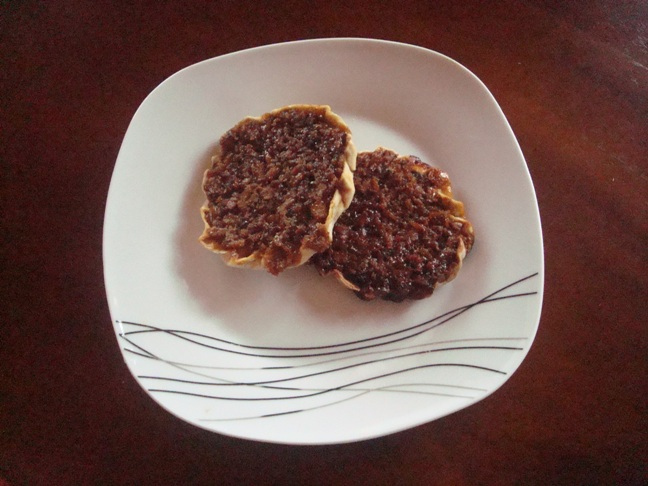
Cocadas of Costa Rica.

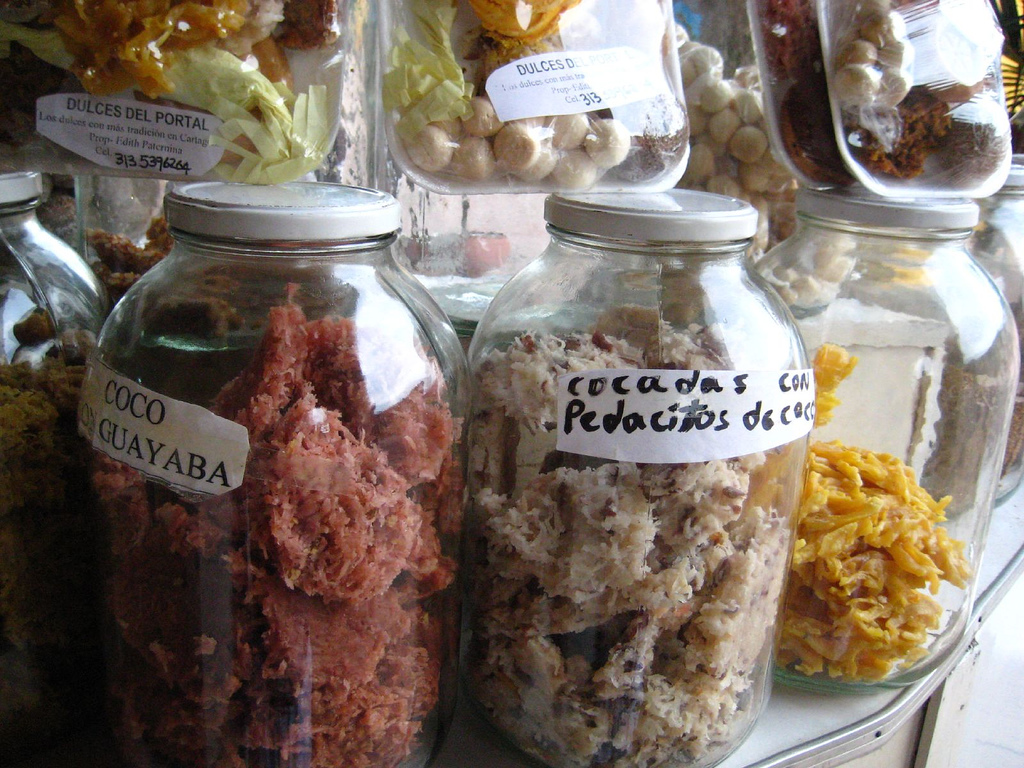
Colombian cocadas in jars.

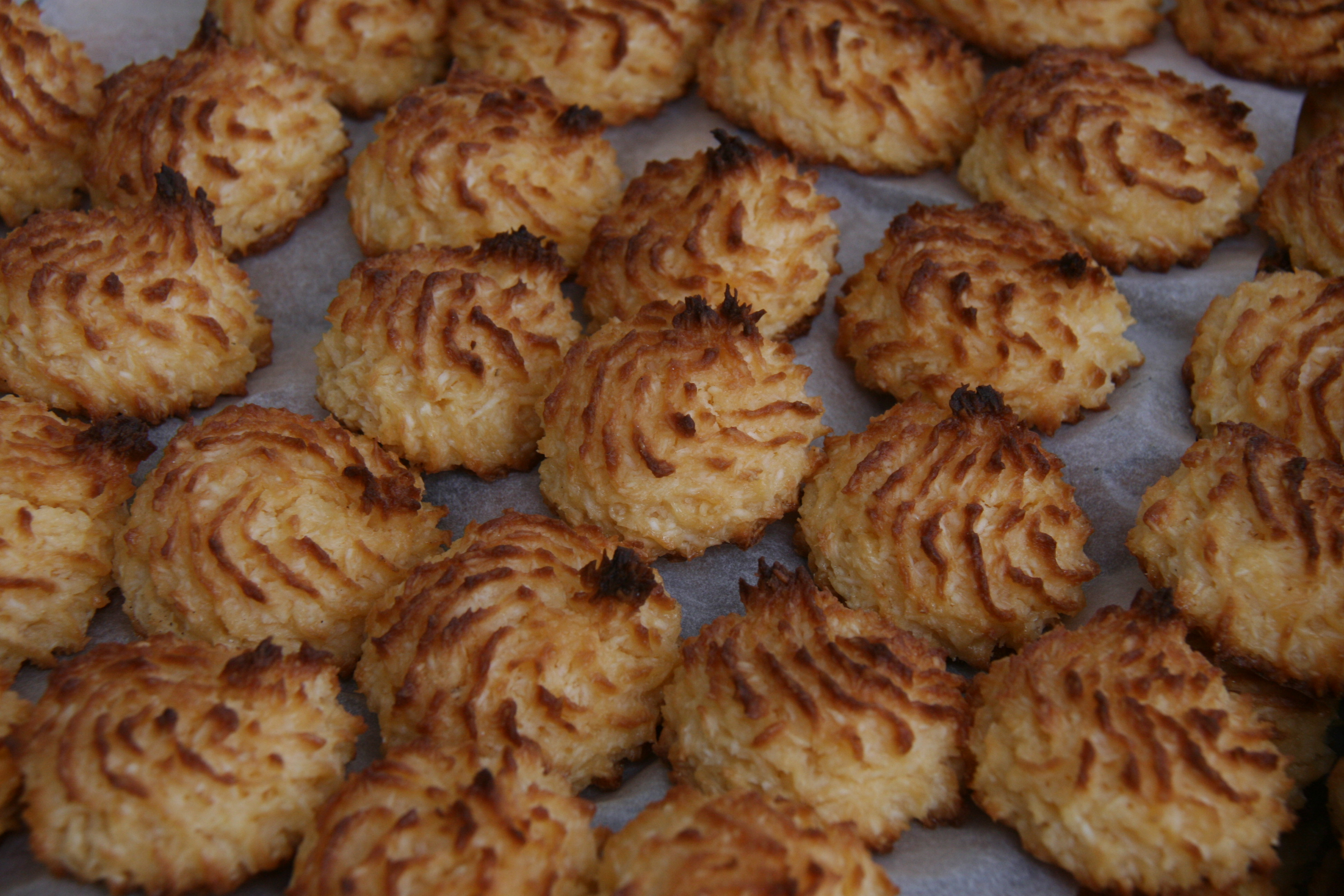
Golden brown cocadas.

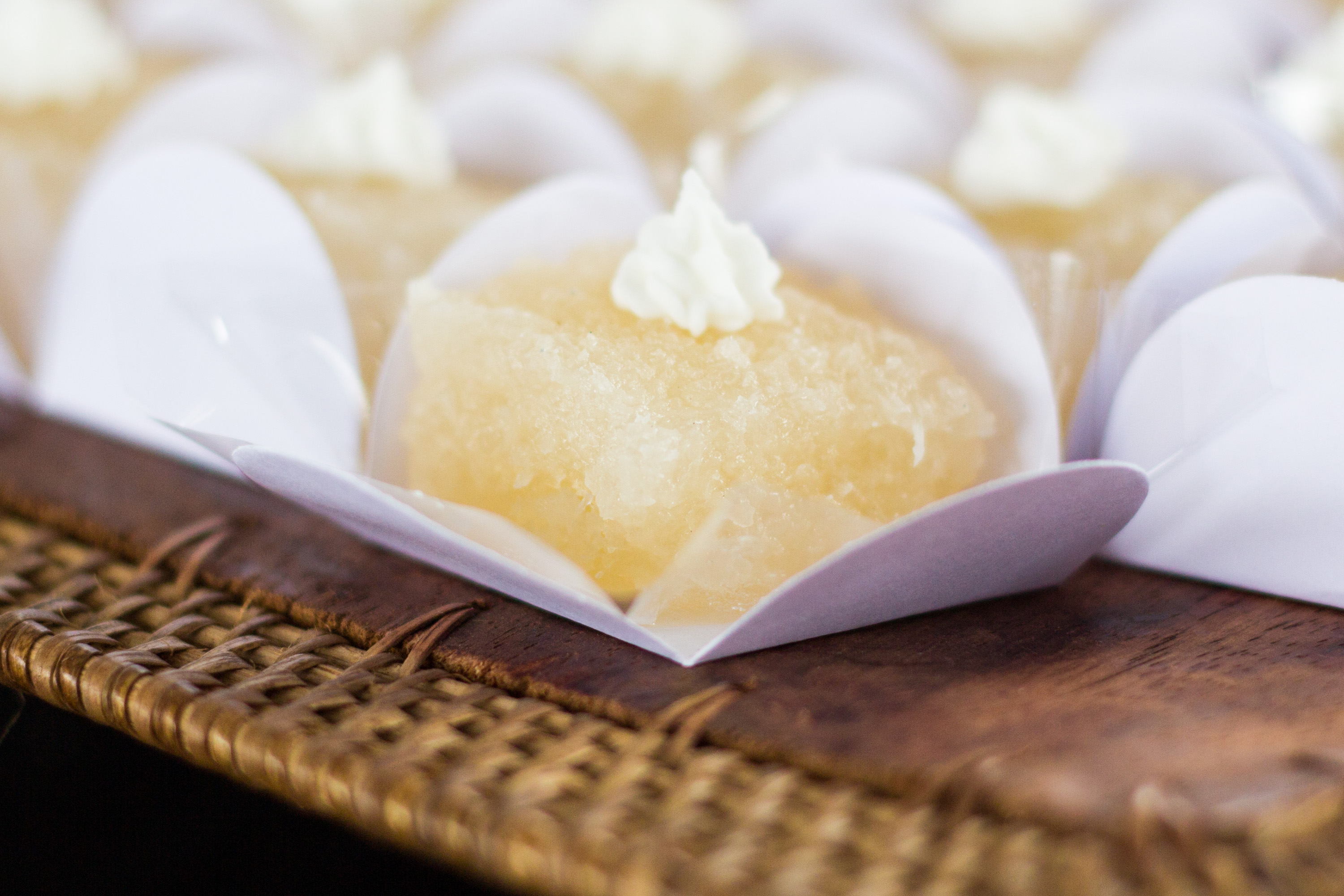
Cocadas of Araçatuba, Brazil.

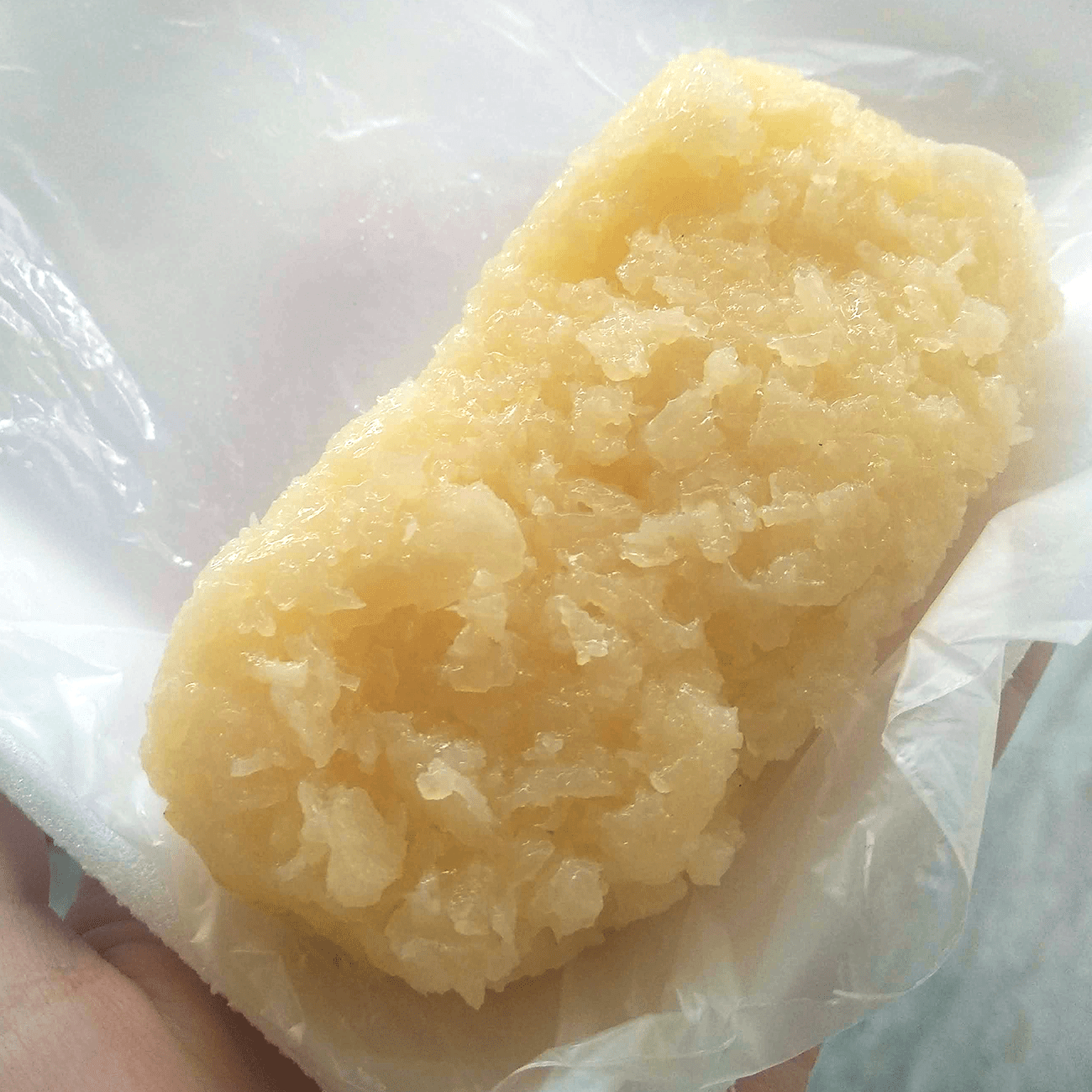
A cocada of Muriqui, Brazil.

== See also ==
- Queijadinha
- Macaroon
- Sugar cake
- List of Brazilian sweets and desserts
