= Sugar cake =

Confectionery made from sugar

- Type: Confectionery
- Place of origin: Caribbean
- Main ingredients: Coconut, sugar, flavorings

Sugar cakes are confections made with grated coconut, sugar, and food coloring. Cooking is done in a saucepan on low heat to avoid burning, and moulding is done immediately afterwards on a baking sheet or shallow plate. They are a popular sweet among schoolchildren in Caribbean countries including Barbados, Trinidad and Tobago, and Guyana; they were also popular during Elizabethan England due to the simple recipe. Sugar cakes are also known as cocada in Latin American countries.
