= Queijada =

Portuguese sweet

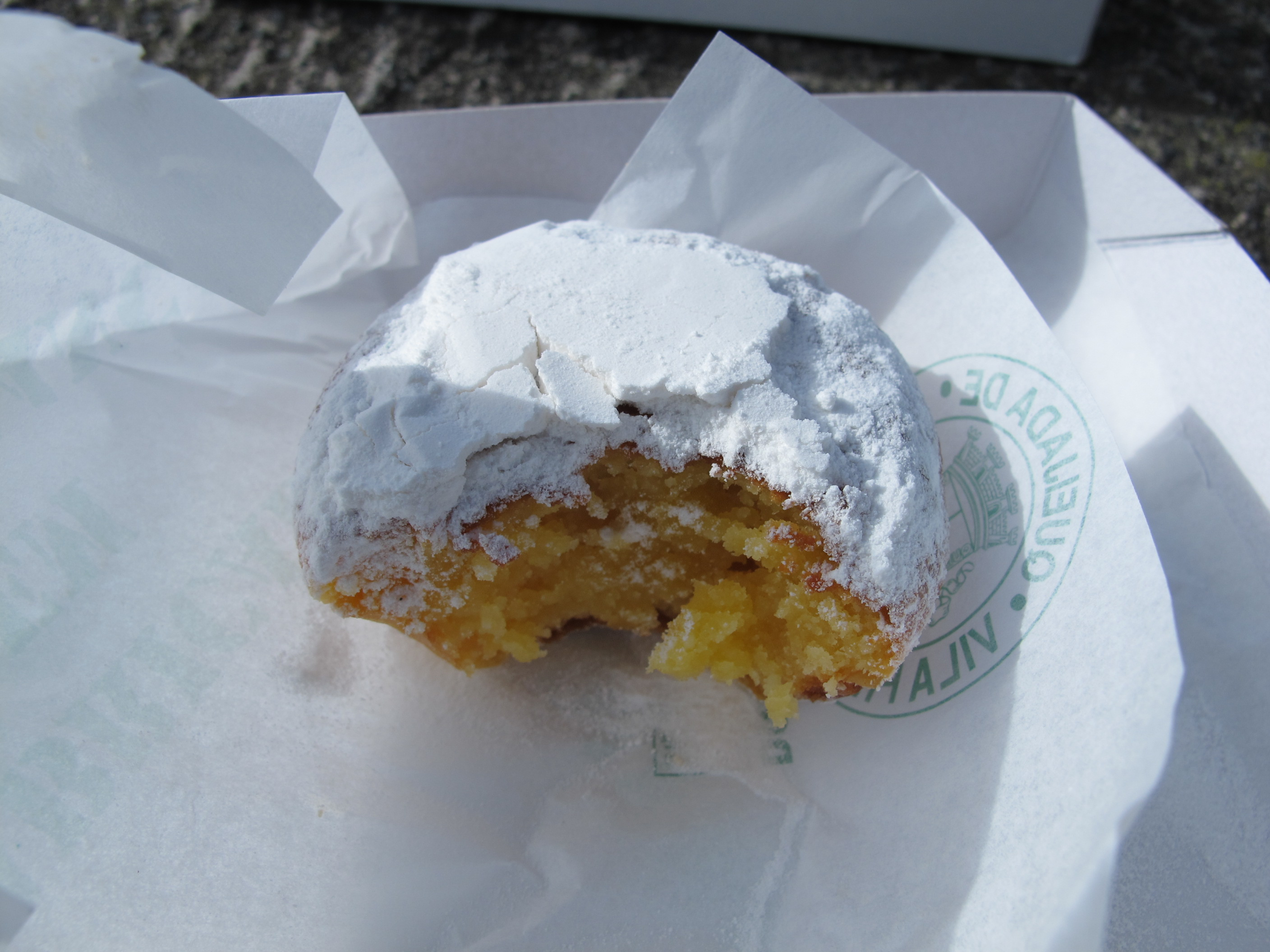
- A queijada from the Azores
- Type: Confectionery
- Place of origin: Portugal
- Main ingredients: cheese, milk, sugar, eggs

Queijada is a type of sweet made most famously in Sintra, Portugal. It is a small sweet prepared using cheese or requeijão, eggs, milk, and powdered sugar. Other queijadas are produced in Madeira, Azores, Oeiras, Évora and Pereira (Montemor-o-Velho). Queijadas vary by region in Portugal, with local recipes reflecting different ingredients and textures. While the version from Sintra is among the most well known, other varieties such as those from Madeira and the Azores may differ in consistency and sweetness. In some cases, queijadas are prepared with fresh cheese such as requeijão, while others resemble custard-based pastries, highlighting the diversity of traditional Portuguese confectionery.

== See also ==
- List of desserts
