= Itacuruçá =

Coordinates: 22.926457°S 43.905883°W

Itacuruçá is a district of the municipality of Mangaratiba, in the Greater Rio de Janeiro, Brazil. It is a part of the Green Coast.
