= Kamarcut =

South Indian confectionery

Kamarkattu
- Course: Dessert
- Place of origin: India
- Region or state: South India
- Main ingredients: Coconut Flakes, Jaggery, Water

Kamarcut, also known as Kamarkattu, Kamarkat, Kamarcut, or Kalkona is a traditional South Indian candy made out of roasted coconut flakes slowly cooked with jaggery syrup.

It is a popular candy in South India and was especially popular during the late 20th century among children. Traditionally sold as a street food by vendors kamarcut was commonly sold in towns and villages, eventually making its way to the shelves of traditional shops in Chennai and other cities in Tamil Nadu. In the early 2020s, however, kamarcut lost popularity and began disappearing from supermarket shelves.
