= List of German desserts =

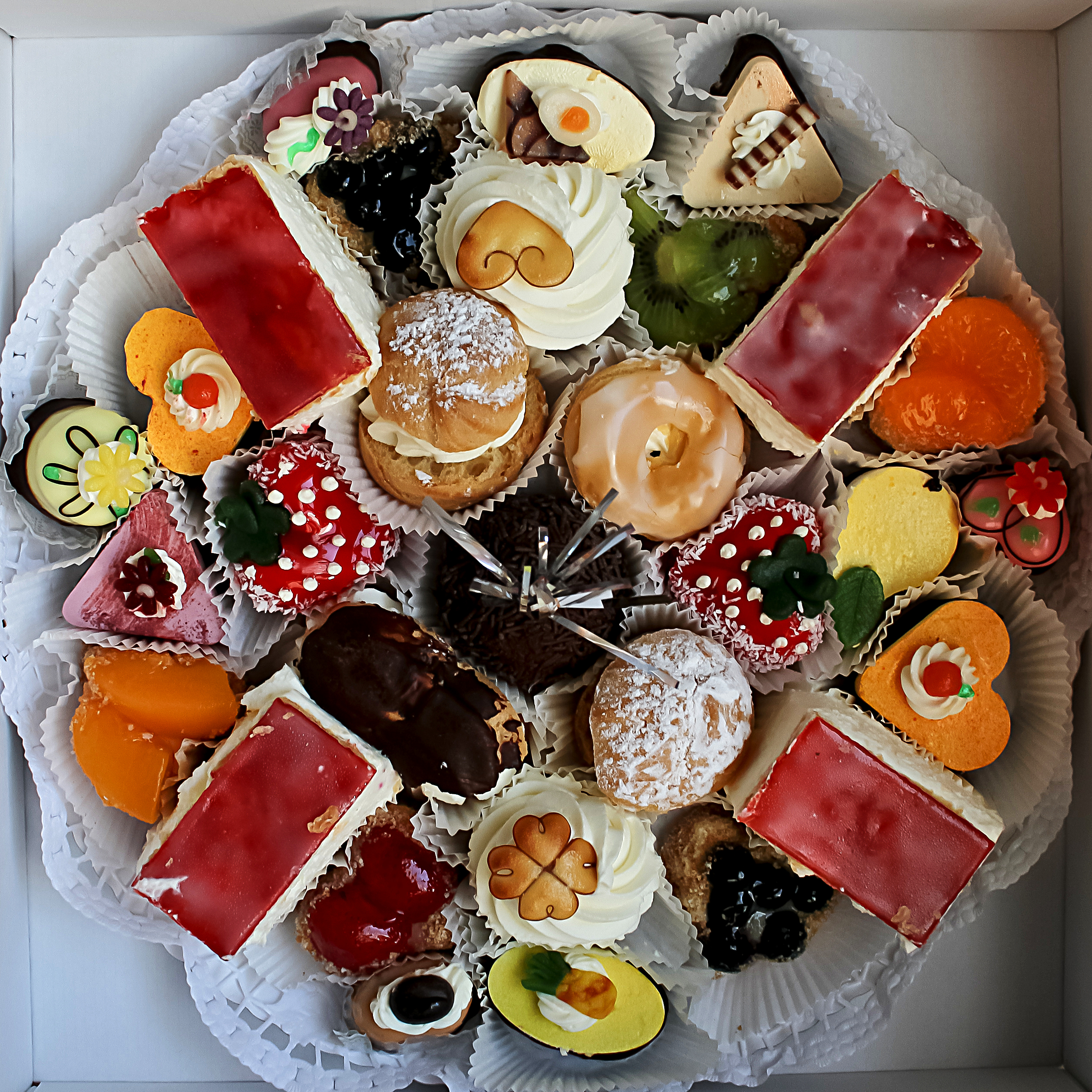
German desserts and pastries

This is a list of German desserts. German cuisine has evolved as a national cuisine through centuries of social and political change with variations from region to region. The southern regions of Germany, including Bavaria and neighbouring Swabia and Saxony, as well as the neighbouring regions in Austria across the border share many dishes.

== German desserts ==
Name	Image	Description
Aachener Printe		A pastry and a type of Lebkuchen originating in the city of Aachen in Germany. The term is a protected designation of origin and so all manufacturers can be found in or near Aachen.
Apple Fritters	Apple Fritters	An Apple Fritter is a traditional German deep-fried pastry that originally comes from the southern part of the Baden and Württemberg regions. It belongs to the fruit beignets family and consists of apple slices dipped in a thick batter and deep-fried in hot fat.
Bavarian cream		A dessert consisting of milk thickened with eggs and gelatin or isinglass, into which whipped cream is folded. The mixture sets up in a cold mold and is unmolded for serving. Earlier versions, sometimes called fromage bavarois, did not include eggs.
Berliner		Similar to a jelly doughnut. Regionally also known as Krapfen, Kreppel or, in Berlin, as Pfannkuchen.
Bethmännchen		A pastry made from marzipan with almond, powdered sugar, rosewater, flour and egg. It is a traditional cookie usually baked for Christmas Day and is widely available in chocolate shops around Frankfurt.
Baumkuchen		Spit cake with characteristic rings that when sliced resemble tree rings (typical from the Salzwedel region).
Bratapfel	Bratäpfel	Baked apples are a simple dessert of baked apples in the oven. They are traditionally prepared in winter at Christmas time from storable, solid and sour apple varieties such as Belle de Boskoop.
Bienenstich		Literally "Bee sting", a German dessert made of a sweet yeast dough with a baked-on topping of caramelized almonds and filled with a vanilla custard, buttercream or cream.
Black Forest cake		(Schwarzwälder Kirschtorte) typically consists of several layers of chocolate cake, with whipped cream and cherries between each layer.
Bremer Kaffeebrot		A pastry specialty of Bremen, it is made by slicing white bread, topping it with butter, sugar and cinnamon and then baking it again. It is commonly served with coffee.
Bremer Klaben		A type of stollen from Bremen, Germany.
Bremer Kluten		Pieces of peppermint fondant, half covered in dark chocolate, about the size of two sugar cubes side by side.
Brenntar		A type of porridge with roasted flour called Musmehl.
Buchteln		Sweet rolls made of yeast dough, filled with jam, ground poppy seeds or curd
Buckwheat gateau		A speciality of the Lüneburg Heath region of Lower Saxony, consisting of layers of cake made from buckwheat flour and heather honey, separated by a fruit layer using yoghurt and cranberries and topped by whipped cream and chocolate shavings.
Butterkuchen		North German specialty, especially in Bremen and Lower Saxony, made of dough with a lot of butter, and topped with sugar and almonds. It is eaten at many opportunities, including while having a coffee with guests, but also during both weddings and funerals. As a result, it is sometimes jokingly called Freud-und-Leid-Kuchen ("cake of joy and suffering").
Carrot cake		A sponge cake with carrots mixed into the batter.
Cheesecake		Traditionally made using a German dairy called Quark instead of cream cheese.
Dampfnudel		Typical of southern Germany, a sort of white bread roll or sweet roll eaten as a meal or as a dessert.
Dominostein		A sweet primarily sold during Christmas season in Germany and Austria.
Donauwelle		A traditional sheet cake popular in Germany and Austria that is prepared with sour cherries, buttercream, cocoa, chocolate and layered batter, like a marble cake.
Eierschecke		Layer cake from Saxony (at least in two types as "Dresdner Eierschecke" and "Freiberger Eierschecke" known).
Fanta cake		A sponge cake made with the carbonated drink Fanta.
Fasnacht		A fried doughnut, traditionally served in the days of Carnival and Fastnacht or on Shrove Tuesday, the day before Lent starts.
Frankfurter Brenten		Traditional tea biscuits from Frankfurt am Main, made from marzipan dough
Frankfurter Kranz		Buttercream based cake representing a crown of kings.
Franzbrötchen		A small, sweet pastry, baked with butter and cinnamon.
Friesentorte	Friesentorte	Layer cake made with whipped cream, puff pastry and plum jam. A specialty of North Frisia and East Frisia.
Gugelhupf		A marble cake or Bundt cake.
Germknödel		A fluffy yeast dough dumpling, filled with spicy plum jam and served with melted butter and a mix of poppy seeds and sugar on top.
Gebrannte Mandeln		Nuts (usually almonds) that have been spiced and candied so they end up coated in a layer of caramelized, crunchy sugar.
Götterspeise		Made of gelatine or other gelling agent, sugar, flavourings and food colouring.
Herrencreme		A vanilla pudding mixed with cream and chocolate shavings and a good amount of rum.
Kuchen		Kuchen is the German word for cake, and is used in other languages as the name for several different types of sweet desserts, pastries, and gateaux.
Lebkuchen		Often sold at Christmas fairs and Carnival.
Leipziger Lerche		A culinary specialty of Leipzig, it consists of a tart shaped shortcrust pastry filled with marzipan and jam, decorated with two crossed strips of dough. It was originally filled with songbirds, however today it is exclusively made sweet.
Linzer Auge		Circular baked goods made from dough seasoned with cinnamon and cloves. The cutouts often form a face.
Mohnkloß		Made from sweet white bread and finely ground poppy seeds boiled in milk with butter.
Muskazine		Made from almonds, spices, sugar, flour, eggs and marzipan.
Marmorkuchen	Marble cake picture	Cake made by lightly mingling two different batters, one dark and one light in color. Marmorkuchen, or marble cake, originated in Germany in the nineteenth century and is popular to this day.
Marzipan		Mix of peeled, ground almonds, sugar and sometimes alcohol and other additives. Used as an ingredient for baking and as an edible medium for decorating or covering cakes. Two important types are Lübecker Marzipan, a protected designation, and Königsberger Marzipan, which has a flamed surface.
Magenbrot		Small, sweet glazed biscuit that shares many similarities with a gingerbread cookie. Often sold at Christmas market.
Nussecke		A shortbread cookie that has ground hazelnuts that is cut into triangles and typically dipped in chocolate.
Pfeffernüsse		Tiny spice cookies.
Prinzregententorte		A Bavarian cake, which consists of at least six thin layers of sponge cake interlaid with chocolate buttercream, with a dark chocolate glaze.
Quarkbällchen		Small, fried dough balls made from a batter containing a lot of quark. Unlike doughnuts, they are made without yeast.
Quarkkäulchen		Saxon dish served with sugar or fruits (typical for Ore Mountains, West-Saxony).
Rote Grütze		Thick mash made of all kinds of red berries, which are cooked with sugar, herbs, flavouring agents and possibly spirits and bound with starch. Served with cold cream or vanilla custard sauce.
Rumtopf		Literally rum pot, a German and Danish dessert, traditionally eaten around Christmas.
Schneeball		A hard, crusty pastry made from shortcrust pastry especially popular in the area of the Franconian city of Rothenburg ob der Tauber and in Austria.
Schnoorkuller		A ball shaped confection made of nut meringue, filled with nougat, rolled in chocolate and sprinkled with nut brittle. It comes from the Schnoor neighborhood of Bremen.
Schokokuss		Sweetened egg-white foam covered with chocolate. Previous names originate from black people's skin color.
Spaghettieis		Ice cream made to look like a plate of spaghetti by pressing it through an appropriate sieve.
Spekulatius		A type of spiced shortcrust biscuit, traditionally baked for consumption around Christmas in the westernmost parts of Germany.
Springerle		A type of German biscuit with an embossed design made by pressing a mold onto rolled dough and allowing the impression to dry before baking.
Spritzgebäck		A type of German Christmas biscuit made of flour, butter, sugar and eggs.
Spritzkuchen		A fried pastry similar to doughnuts.
Stollen		A fruit cake containing dried fruit and often marzipan and covered with sugar, powdered sugar or icing sugar.
Streusel		A crumbly topping of flour, butter, and sugar.
Streuselkuchen		A yeast dough covered with streusel.
Tollatsch		From the region of Pomerania, made of flour, sugar, a blend of Lebkuchen spices, bread crumbs, almonds, and raisins. Tollatsch also contains the uncommon ingredients pork blood and Griebenschmalz (schmaltz with gribenes). The dough is cooked in meat broth.
Vanillekipferl		Small, crescent shaped biscuits.
Welfenspeise		A two-layered pudding, with cooked milk and vanilla sauce and very stiffly whipped egg white on the bottom, and a yellow layer of wine sauce made of beaten egg yolk, white wine and a little lemon juice on the top.
Wibele		Very small, sweet biscuits originating from the Franconian city of Langenburg in Germany, though nowadays they are considered a Swabian speciality.
Windbeutel		Choux pastry filled with whipped cream and various other fillings.
Zwetschgenkuchen		A sheet cake or pie made from yeast dough or shortcrust dough that is thinly spread onto a baking sheet and covered with pitted plums.

== See also ==
- Cuisine
- German cuisine – Desserts
- List of desserts
