= German cake =

German cake may refer to:

- a German dessert
- German chocolate cake, originally called German's chocolate cake
- Black Forest cake, a German dessert
- Kuchen, the German word for cake

== See also ==
- German knuckle cake, a sexual activity
