= Kuchen =

Several different types of desserts

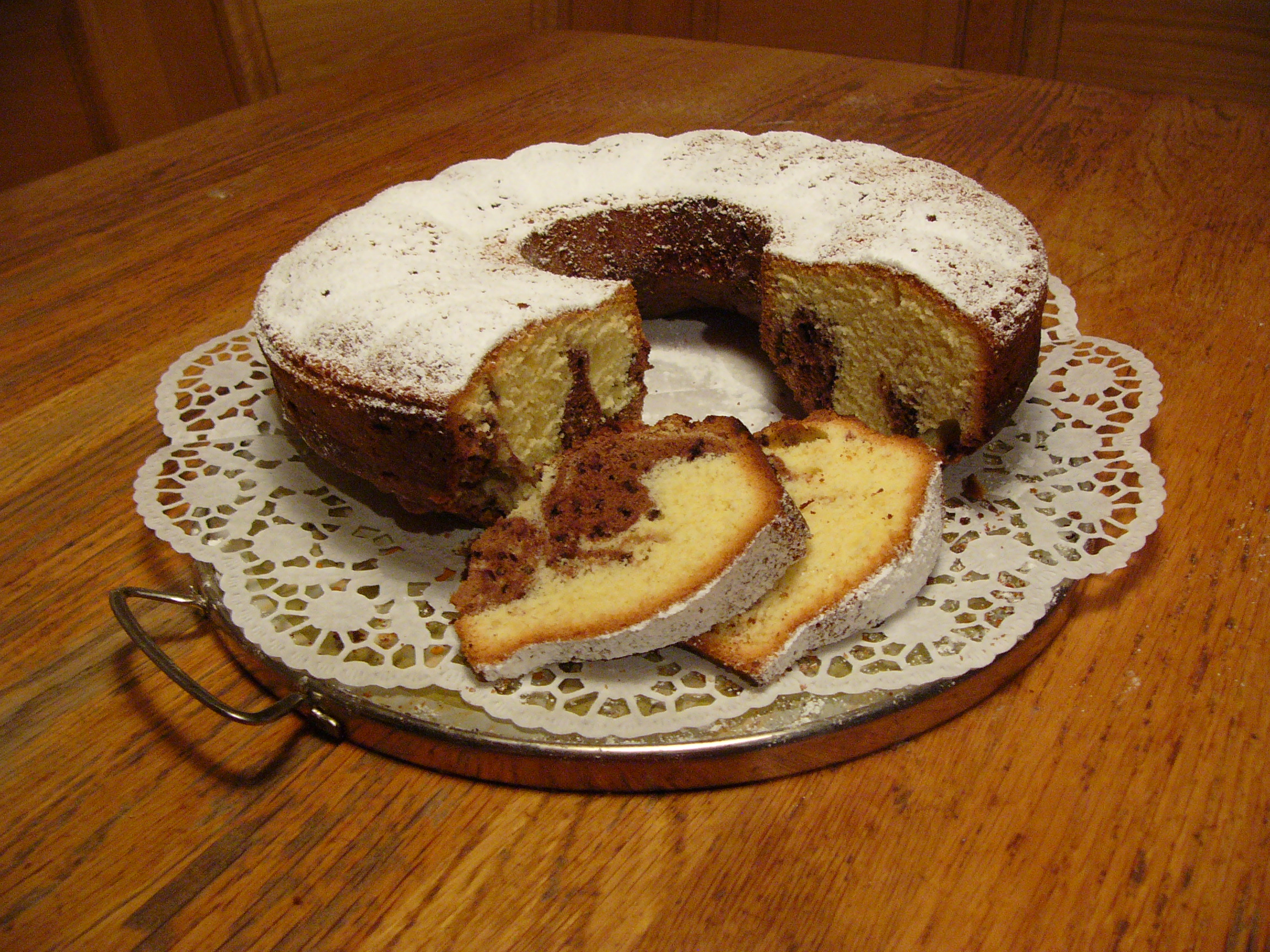
- Marmorkuchen
- Type: Desserts and pastries
- Place of origin: Germany

Kuchen (German pronunciation: [ˈkuːxən]), the German word for cake, is used in other languages as the name for several different types of savory or sweet desserts, pastries, and gateaux. Most Kuchen have eggs, flour and sugar as common ingredients while also, but not always, including some form of fat, often butter or cream. (The sugar may also be replaced by honey or, in cakes directed to diabetic people or people on a diet, a sugar substitute.)

The term "kuchen" itself may cover as many distinct desserts as its English counterpart "cake". However, the word "cake" encompasses both Kuchen and Torte, sometimes confusing one with the other. The key difference between a Torte and Kuchen is that a torte is decorated or layered with cream, frosting, or ganache, while kuchen is typically less "decorative" or fancy in nature. Additionally, the word "Kuchen" encompasses desserts that English speakers may call "pie", such as Apfelkuchen (apple pie). Examples of a Torte made from a "base Kuchen" include the Jewish Palacsinken Torte and Mohn Torte (or Kindli).

== Varieties ==
- A pie-like pastry, with a thick, "cakey" crust and a sweet custard based or chopped fruit filling or topping, known as an Obstkuchen or a type of fruit cake. This variation sometimes has a sweet icing, struesel, or decorative cream topping. Variations include Erdbeerkuchen and Apfelkuchen.

People who trace their ancestry to the group known as Germans from Russia call a pastry like the first half of this definition "Kuchen." It is not called Obstkuchen. It is not at all like a fruit cake, nor does it have an icing. Rather, the dish more closely resembles a pie than it does a cake; it is "like a fruit pie or tart".This variation of kuchen is the official South Dakota State Dessert; it is prominent in South Dakota as well as other Upper Midwest states due to these states’ high concentrations of descendants of German-Russian emigrants. (See the Germans from Russia Heritage Society [grhs.org] and on Facebook, Germans from Russia Food and Culture.)

- A rolled-pastry, specifically called Kuchenrolle, with a long spiral of dough sometimes filled with cream or jam, rolled, baked and then sliced to serve. This is sometimes known as a nut roll when nuts are added.
- A coffee cake-like pastry, marbled with veins and pockets of cinnamon, baked throughout; its primary components are butter and sugar. A marble cake or pound cake would be variations of this form, specifically known as a Marmorkuchen and Rührkuchen respectively. Streuselkuchen is a variation of this form.
- A cheese cake-like pastry, specifically called Käsekuchen, with a yeast raised crust, sometimes filled with fruit (cherry is most popular), and a creamy filling made from the German cheese Quark.
- A pan-fried pastry, specifically known as Pfannkuchen, a German pancake thicker than French Crepes and often filled with a sweet or savory filling. An egg based variation is called Eierkuchen.
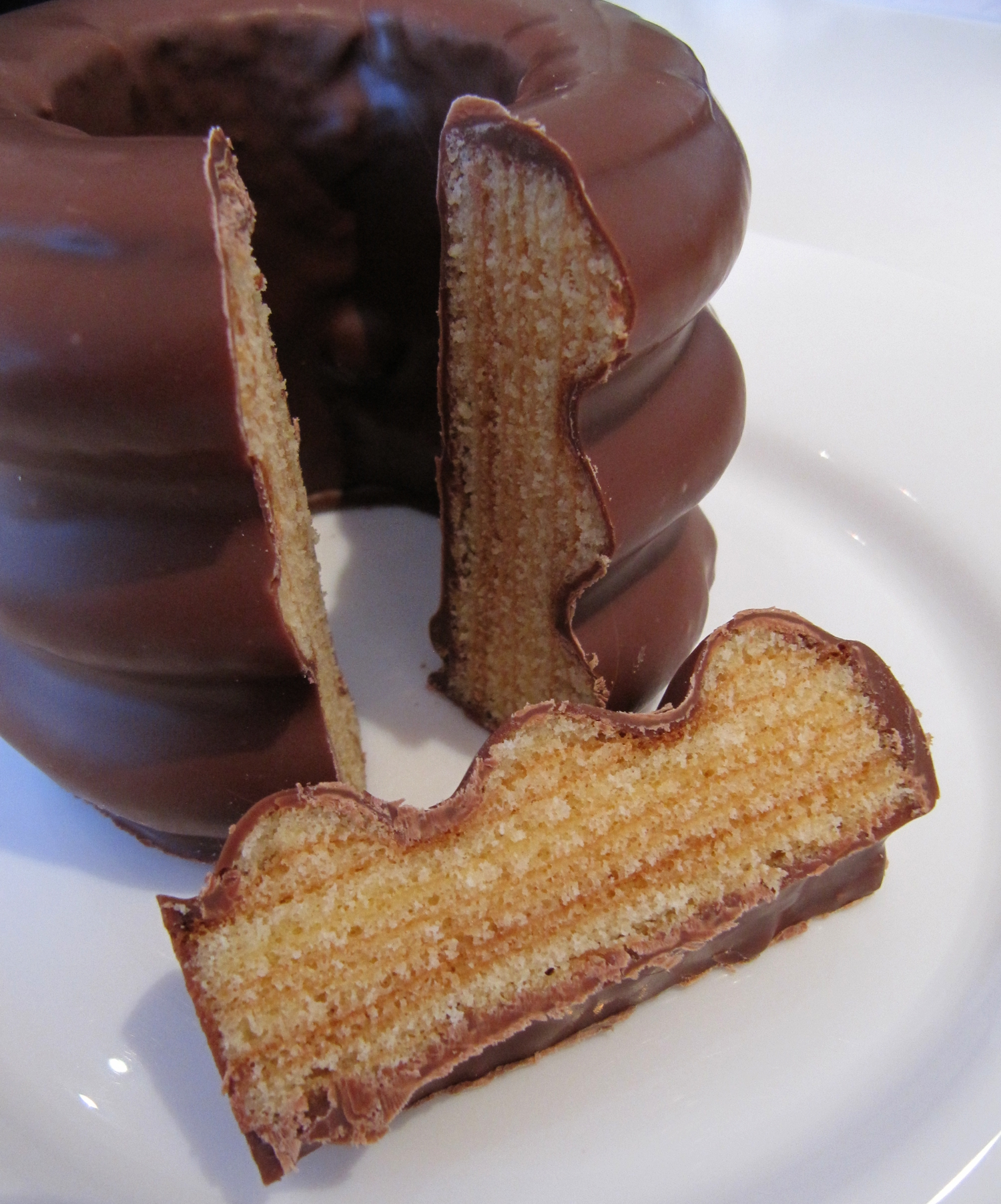
  Baumkuchen
- A layered pastry, commonly known as a Baumkuchen, made over a spit while brushing on layers of batter.
- A sheet-cake-like pastry, specifically known as Blechkuchen, with variations similar to other forms of Kuchen with the key difference being that this form is baked on a sheet. Can be butter based, known as Butterkuchen, or filled with fruit. Lebkuchen is one such variation commonly made during Christmas.

Kuchen also does not have to fall under a sweet category as there are savory variations of it as well. These are called pikante Kuchen, with examples such as Zwiebelkuchen, Speckkuchen, and Kartoffelkuchen (often paired with fresh wine or beer).

== Blechkuchen ==
Several kinds of sheet cake are also part of traditional German cuisine. They are typically not iced or decorated for a specific celebration as American sheet cakes are, and may use any kind of dough such as yeast-leavened or sponge.

Examples of German-style sheet cakes (Blechkuchen, pronounced [ˈblɛçˌkuːxn̩]) include Bienenstich, Donauwelle, Butterkuchen and Schmandkuchen.

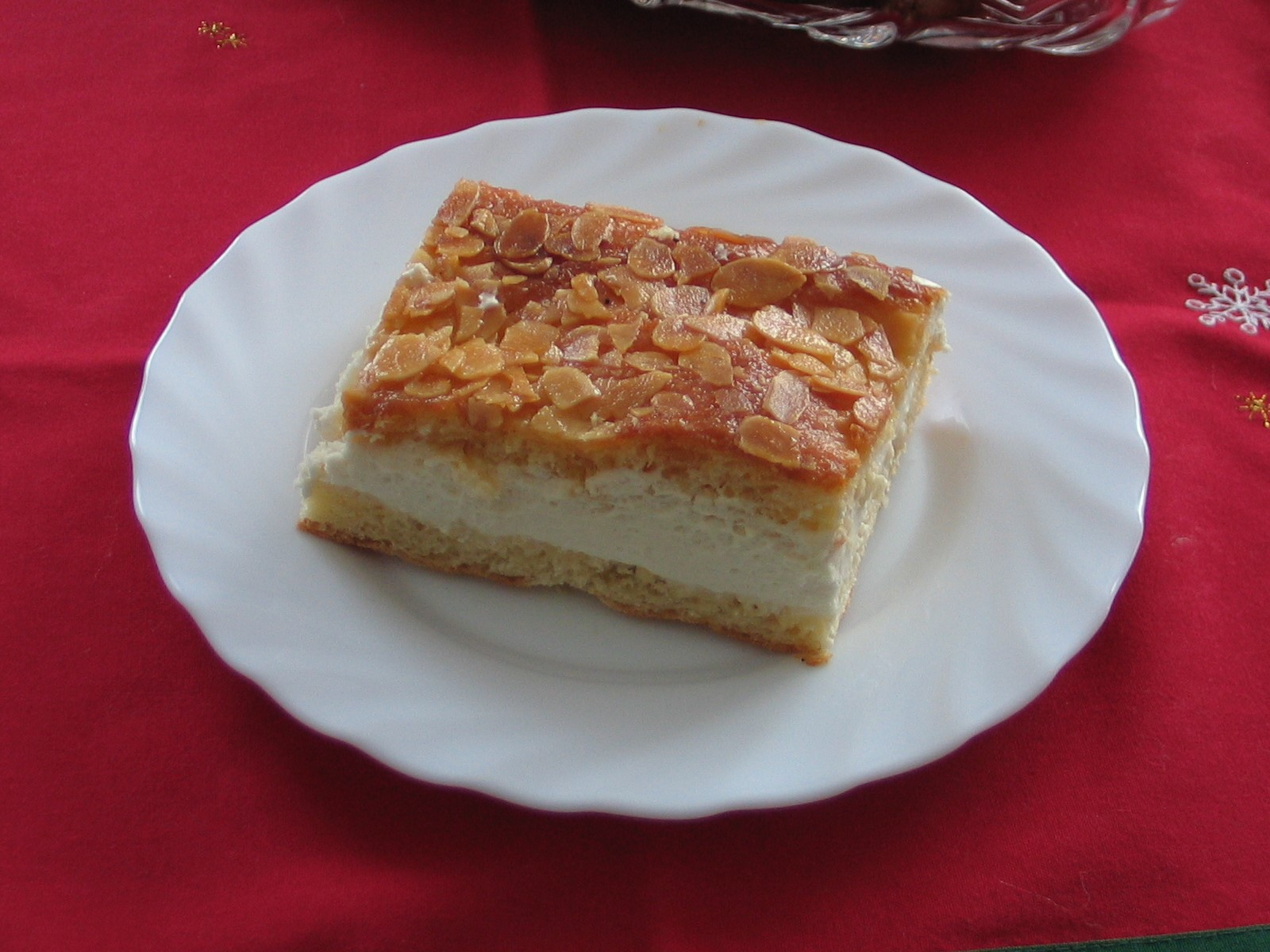
Bienenstich

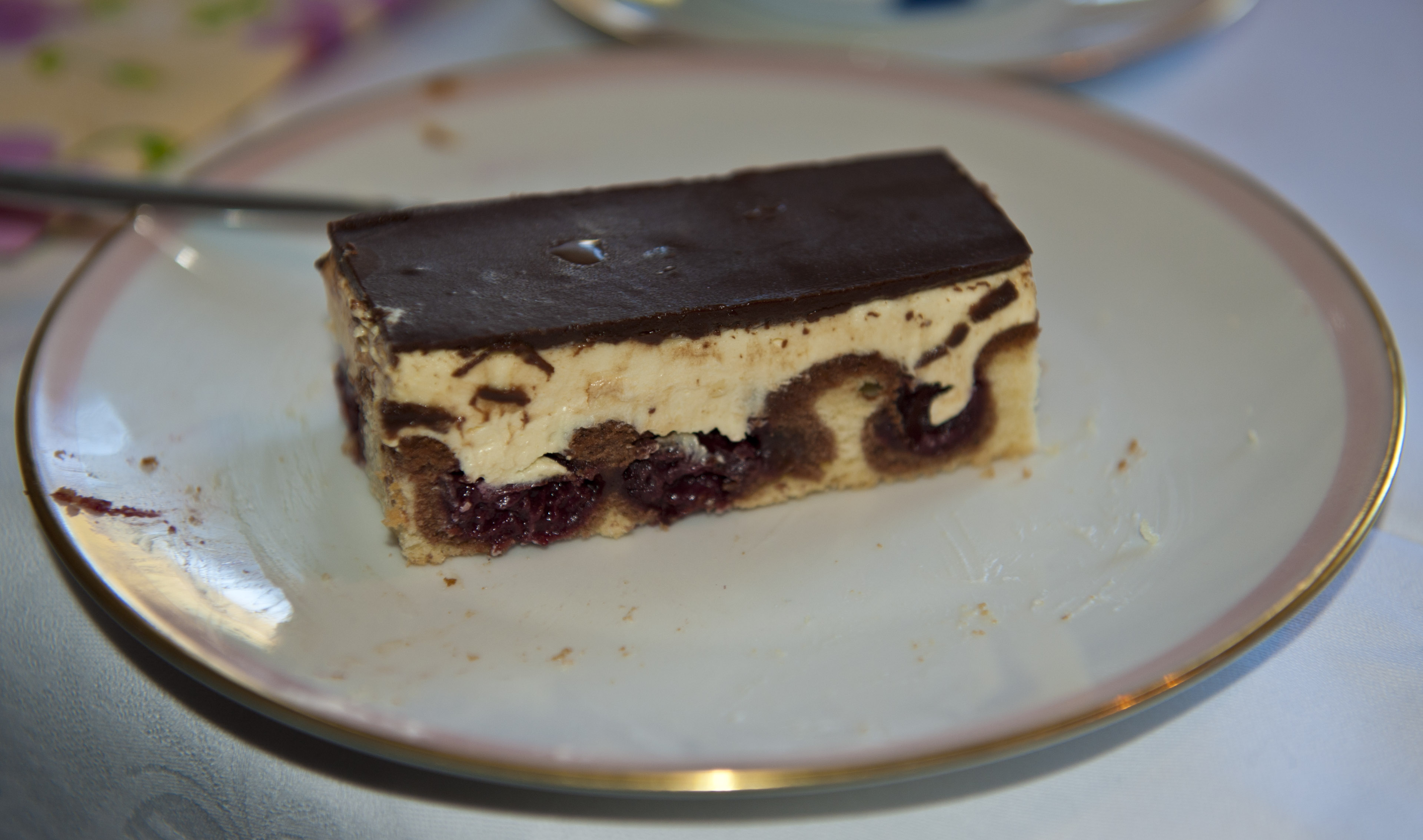
Donauwelle, cross-section

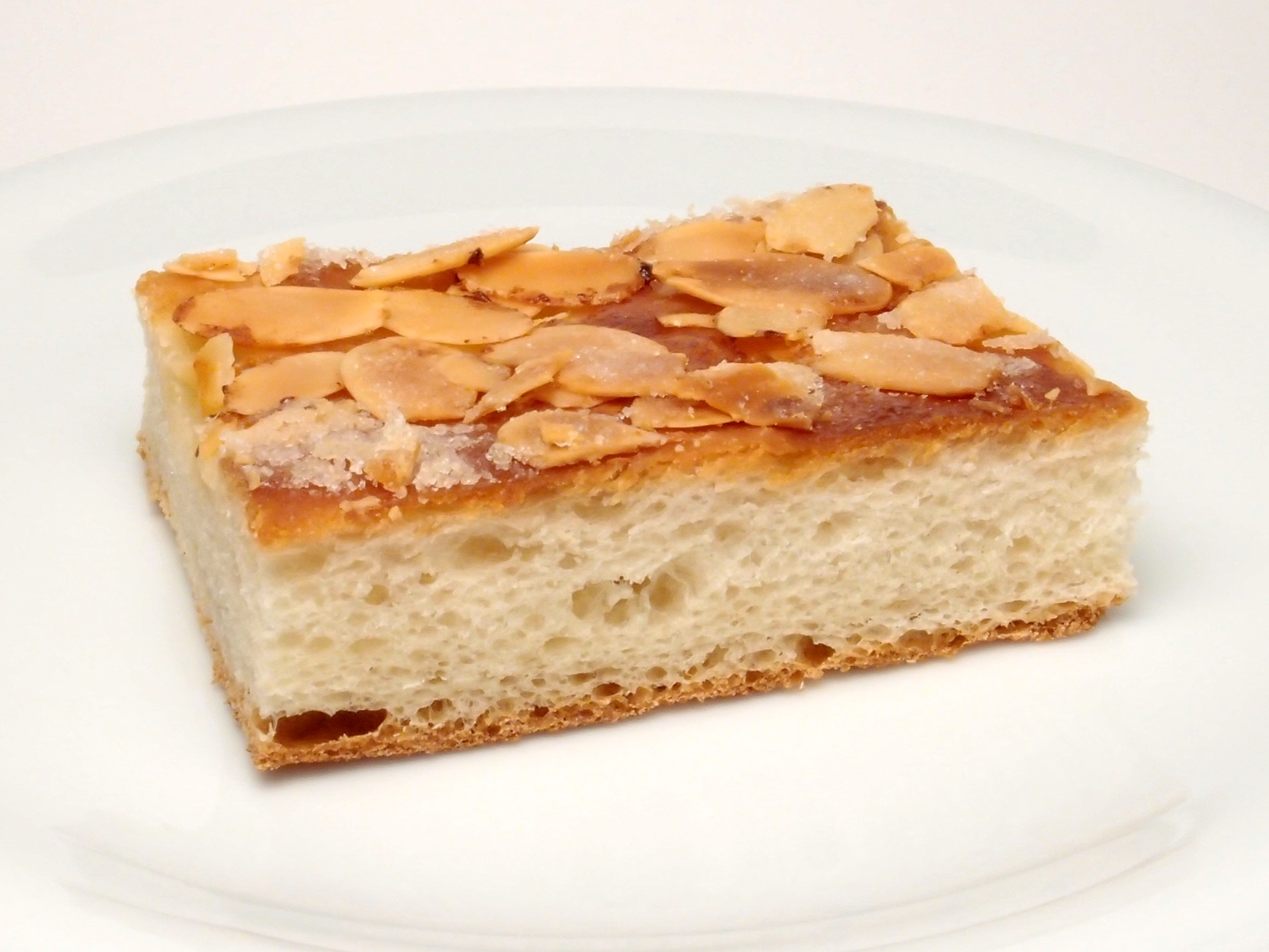
A slice of Butterkuchen, showing a yeasted dough base and almond topping

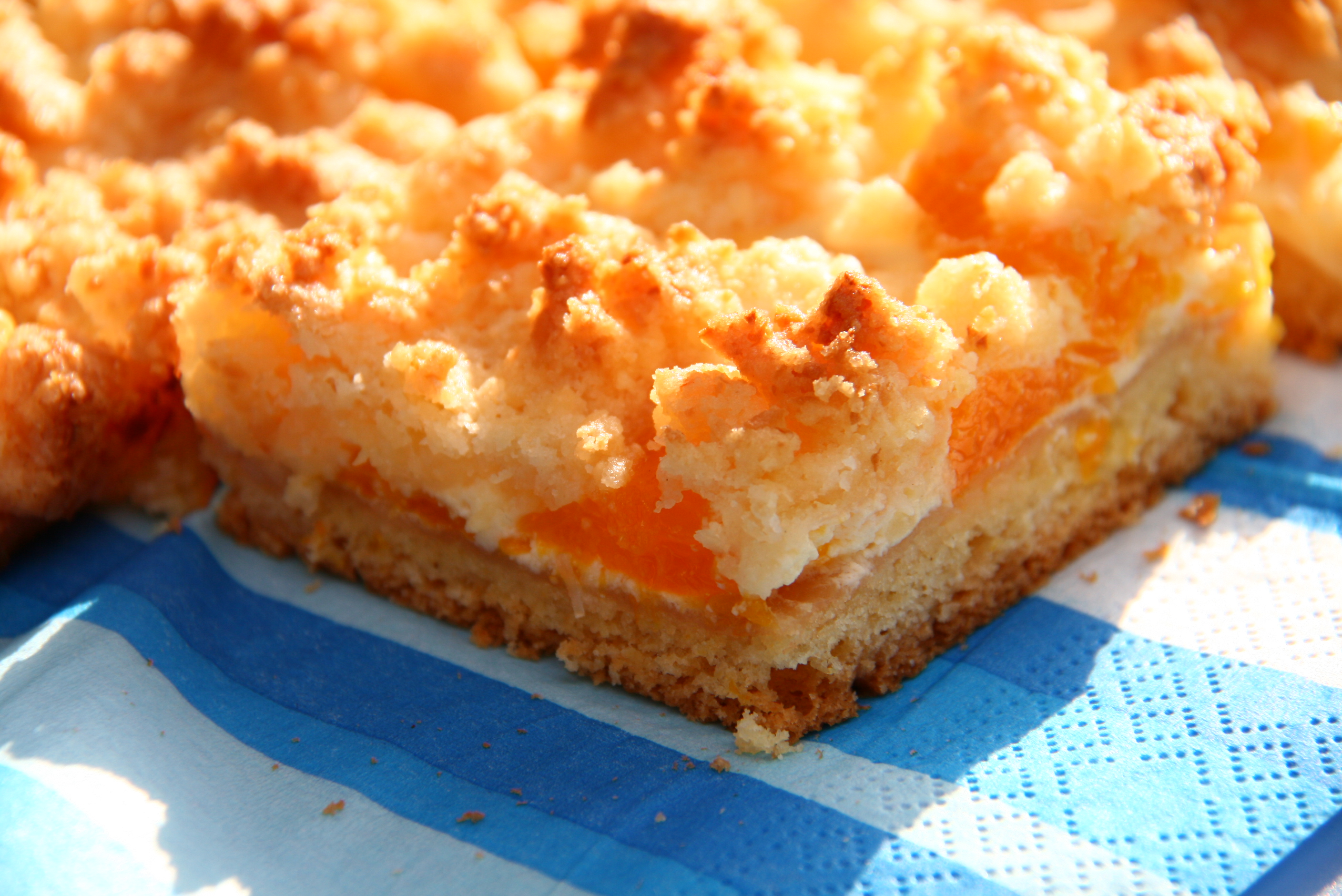
Schmandkuchen

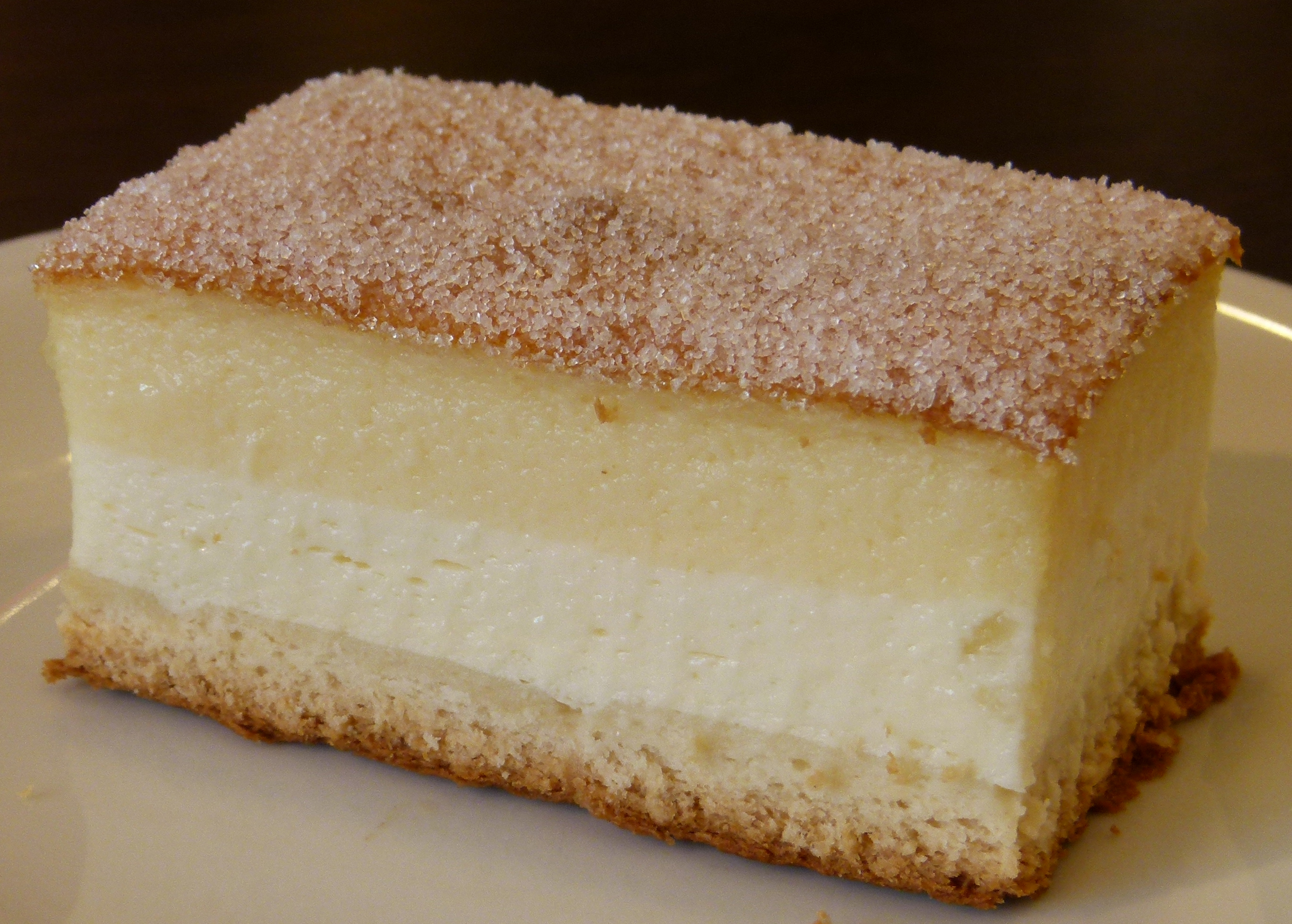
Eierschecke

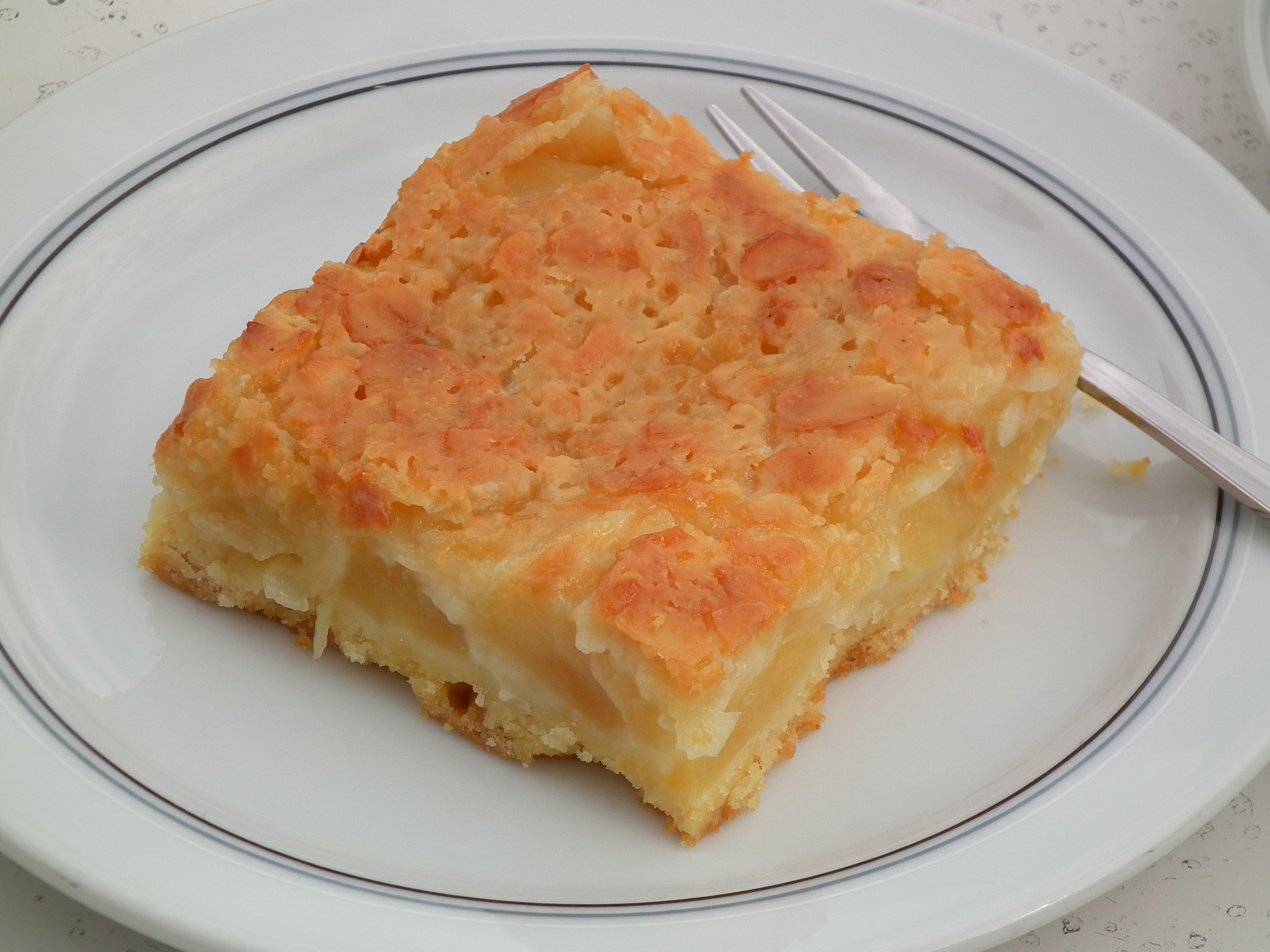
A slice of apple sheet cake

== Jewish variations and traditions ==
In the United States, back when Jewish immigrants were first arriving in the country, many of the recipes that they brought with them utilized dried fruits as it was difficult to come across fresh ones in their home countries. One that was particularly favored is compote. Desserts have long since changed to become more sophisticated as fresh fruits are now abundant.

Lekach is a Jewish honey cake of German origin. It comes from Lebkuchen, or honey-sweetened gingerbread. This has roots from as early as the twelfth century, when it was customary for boys attending heder (school for Jewish children) to bring a piece of honey cake to the first day of school.

Rugelach is a form of the rolled-pastry variation of Kuchen. They are usually filled with nuts and raisins, with a pastry composed of cheese curds and sour cream.

Mandelbrot, which literally means almond bread, resembles and is served toasted like bread despite not being made of bread dough. They are commonly paired with sweet wine, and when compared to Biscotti they are more "cakey" and softer.

== Cultural influence ==
Kuchen dessert recipes are presumably handed down from people of German heritage and as such are often popular in many areas of which currently speak or formerly spoke the German language in the United States, particularly Montana, North Dakota, South Dakota, Indiana, Minnesota, and Wisconsin. The kuchen variation found here is aligned with the German from Russia variation described above. This variation was brought to the United States in the late nineteenth century by recipe-bearers who were Germanic by ethnicity and Russian by residency, arriving from ports near the Black Sea in what is now Ukraine. These German immigrants ended up in what we refer to as Russia due to their native German region’s unstable political and socioeconomic status as it resulted from feudalism. When life in Russia itself became unstable, the migrants emigrated again, this time to the United States.

In the Germanosphere, it is a common tradition to invite friends over to one's house or to a cafe between noon and evening to drink coffee and eat Kuchen ("Kaffee und Kuchen"[1][2]). This tradition originated amongst female workers in Germany, who referred to the practice as “kaffeklatsch”, or “coffee gossip”. This practice then migrated to regions of Russia and the Upper Midwest via the Germans from Russia ethnic group, and primarily the women of this group. These women used the custom as a means of connection on the often isolating Great Plains.

Kuchen was introduced into Chilean cuisine when German immigrants settled southern Chile in the 1850s. Kuchen in Chile usually have fruits, such as apples, strawberries or murtas. Nontraditional Chilean Kuchen with walnuts are sometimes offered. Now Kuchen are found in many Chilean bakeries and in many of the larger supermarkets.

In Brazil it is called "cuca", or less commonly, "cuque" and can be found in areas of German settlement, like Rio Grande do Sul, Paraná and Santa Catarina states.

The French quiche was influenced by the savory version of German Kuchen and is now known as a traditional French dish.

In 2000, a Kuchen was designated the state dessert of South Dakota. Introduced by German settlers in the 1870s, Kuchen is now found throughout the state and can be found in peach, apple, prune and chocolate pecan variations. Bakeries in the Upper Midwest that serve this variation of kuchen include Grandma’s Kuchen in South Dakota and Pietz’s Kuchen Kitchen in North Dakota. Additionally, North Dakota and Minnesota grocery chain Hornbacher’s sells pre-made kuchen, and many German restaurants in the Dakotas also feature the item on their dessert list, demonstrating the dish’s prominence in the region

== See also ==
- Austrian cuisine
- Backe, backe Kuchen
- German cuisine
- List of German desserts
- Saxon cuisine
- History of Germans in Russia, Ukraine, and the Soviet Union
