= Prinzregententorte =

Bavarian layer cake

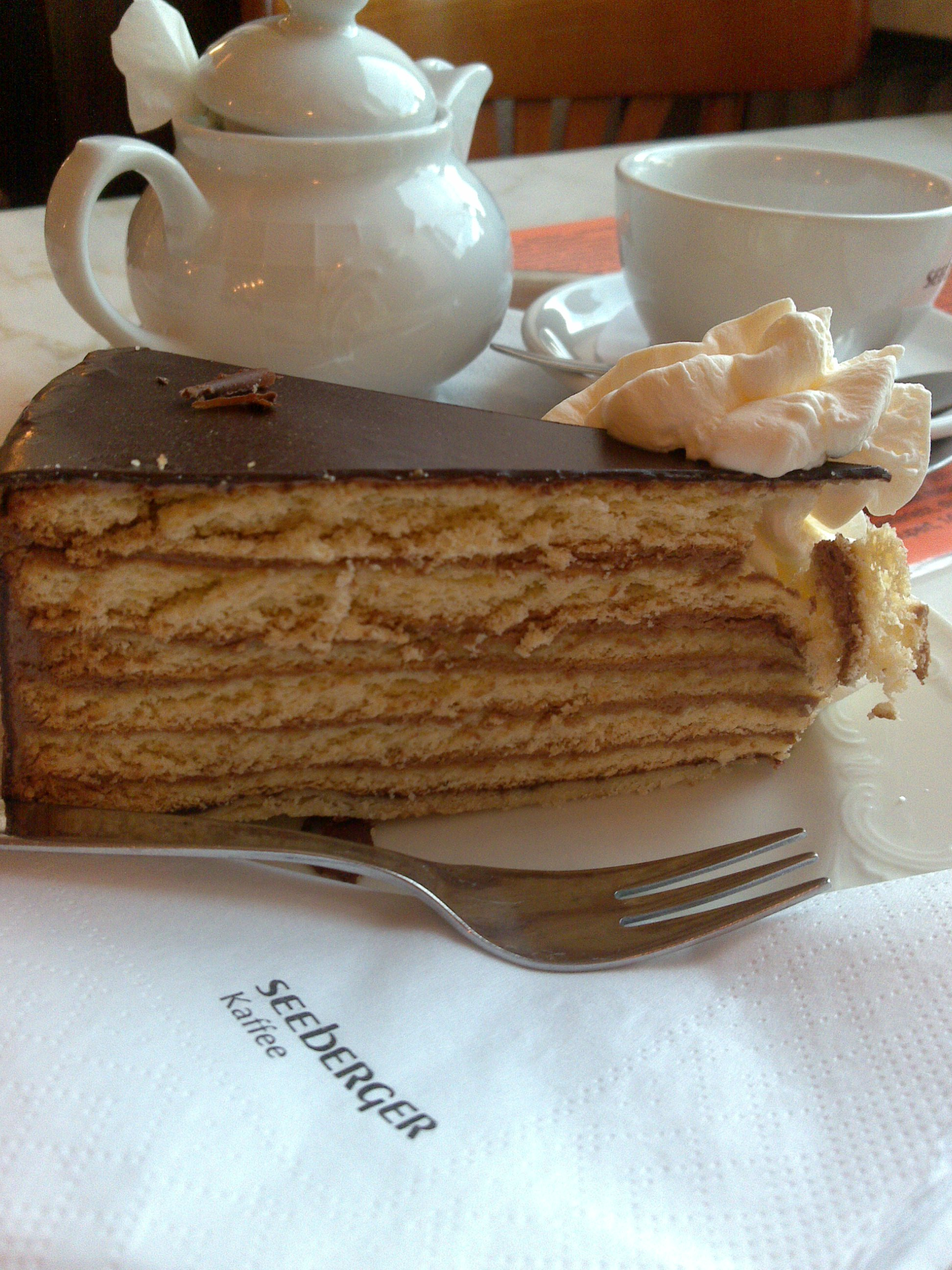
- A slice of prinzregententorte
- Type: Cake
- Place of origin: Germany
- Region or state: Bavaria
- Main ingredients: Sponge cake, chocolate buttercream, chocolate glaze

Prinzregententorte (German: [ˈpʁɪnts.ʁeˌɡɛntənˌtɔʁtə]) is a Bavarian torte consisting of at least six, usually seven, thin layers of sponge cake interlaid with chocolate buttercream, and a covering of a dark chocolate glaze. The cake is widely regarded as a specialty of Bavarian cuisine and is commonly available in confectioneries throughout Bavaria.

== Origin ==
The cake is named after Luitpold, Prince Regent of Bavaria, who exercised the authority of the Bavarian throne from 1886 to his death in 1912. The cake's exact origin remains in dispute; among those claimed as its creators are the prince regent's cook, Johann Rottenhoeffer, the baker Anton Seidl, and the baking firm of Heinrich Georg Erbshäuser.

A Prinzregententorte originally had eight layers of both cake and cream, so as to represent the eight districts the Kingdom of Bavaria once had. Since one of those regions, the Palatinate, was split off from Bavaria and merged with surrounding lands to form the new federal state of Rhineland-Palatinate by the American Military Government after World War II, which the locals later confirmed in a plebiscite, the double-layers were subsequently reduced to seven.

== Recipe ==
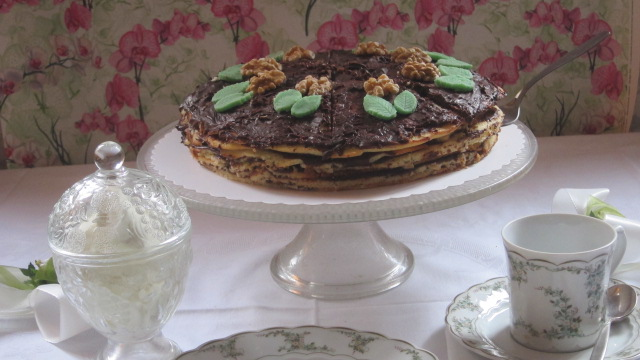
Whole Prinzregententorte

Typically, the cake consists of very thin layers of sponge cake, each approximately 25 centimetres (9.8 in) in diameter, with chocolate buttercream on each side. Apricot jam may be added to the topmost layer, and the whole cake is covered in dark chocolate.

== In popular culture ==
The Prinzregententorte appeared in series 12, episode 5, of the Great British Bake Off, as the technical challenge.

== See also ==
- Doberge cake
- Dobos torte
- Rigó Jancsi, another famous Hungarian dessert created in the same era
- Sachertorte
- Smith Island cake, official dessert of the state of Maryland.
- Spekkoek, a Dutch layered cake
- List of cakes
- List of desserts
- List of German desserts
