= Sheet cake =

Cake baked in a flat rectangular pan

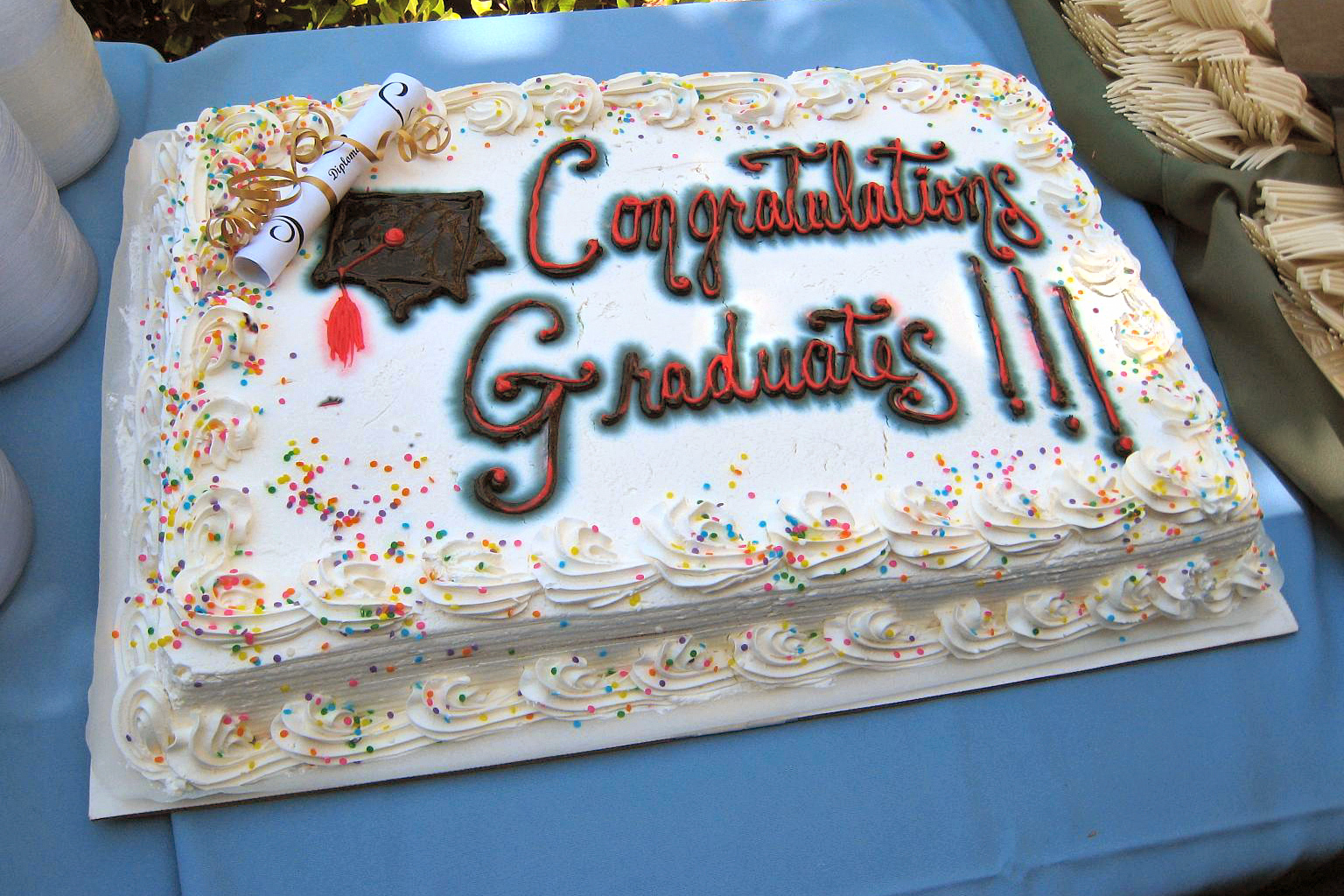
- Decorated sheet cake
- Alternative names: Slab cake
- Type: Cake
- Course: Dessert
- Serving temperature: Cold

A sheet cake or slab cake is a cake baked in a large, flat, rectangular cake pan. Sheet cakes can be grouped into two broad categories.

Sheet cakes are usually 2 inches (5 cm) deep, although they are sometimes 3 inches (8 cm) deep. These single-layer cakes are frequently frosted, with decorations and ornamental frosting along the borders and the flat top surface.

These cakes are commonly available pre-made in supermarkets and bakeries and tend to be inexpensive due to their simple manufacturing process. There are many brands that sell boxed cake mixes that can be baked as sheet cakes, including Betty Crocker, King Arthur Flour, and Duncan Hines.

== Flavors ==
They may be made in any flavor, with chocolate and vanilla being the two most common. Commonly made in the home with boxed cake mixes, they can come in a variety of additional flavors or with batter mix-ins, such as sprinkles and chocolate chips. Sheet cakes are made from a single continuous piece of cake, or, for very large cakes, several sheets of cake placed side by side so that it looks like a single continuous piece of cake. Nuts, chocolate chips, coconut flakes, or other toppings can be sprinkled over the top.

A layer cake may be made from a sheet cake that has been split, filled with jam or icing, and frosted.

== Size ==
Cake sizes are named after the size of pan that the cake is baked in. Sheet cakes, in general, are usually 2 to 3 inches (5 to 8 cm) deep, though some recipes call for a thin sheet cake of 1 inch (2.5 cm) depth.

In American sizing, the full-size sheet pan is 26 in × 18 in (660 mm × 460 mm), which is too large for most home ovens. A half sheet pan is half that size, or about 18 in × 13 in (460 mm × 330 mm). Quarter sheets are 9 in × 13 in (230 mm × 330 mm). The half sheet is approximately the same size as the largest mass-market sheet cakes found in supermarkets, and the quarter sheet is a common size for rectangular, single-layer cakes (e.g., the size used for a regular-sized box of cake mix, holding six cups (1.5 L) of batter).

A quarter-sheet usually results in 16 to 24 servings of cake.

== Gallery ==
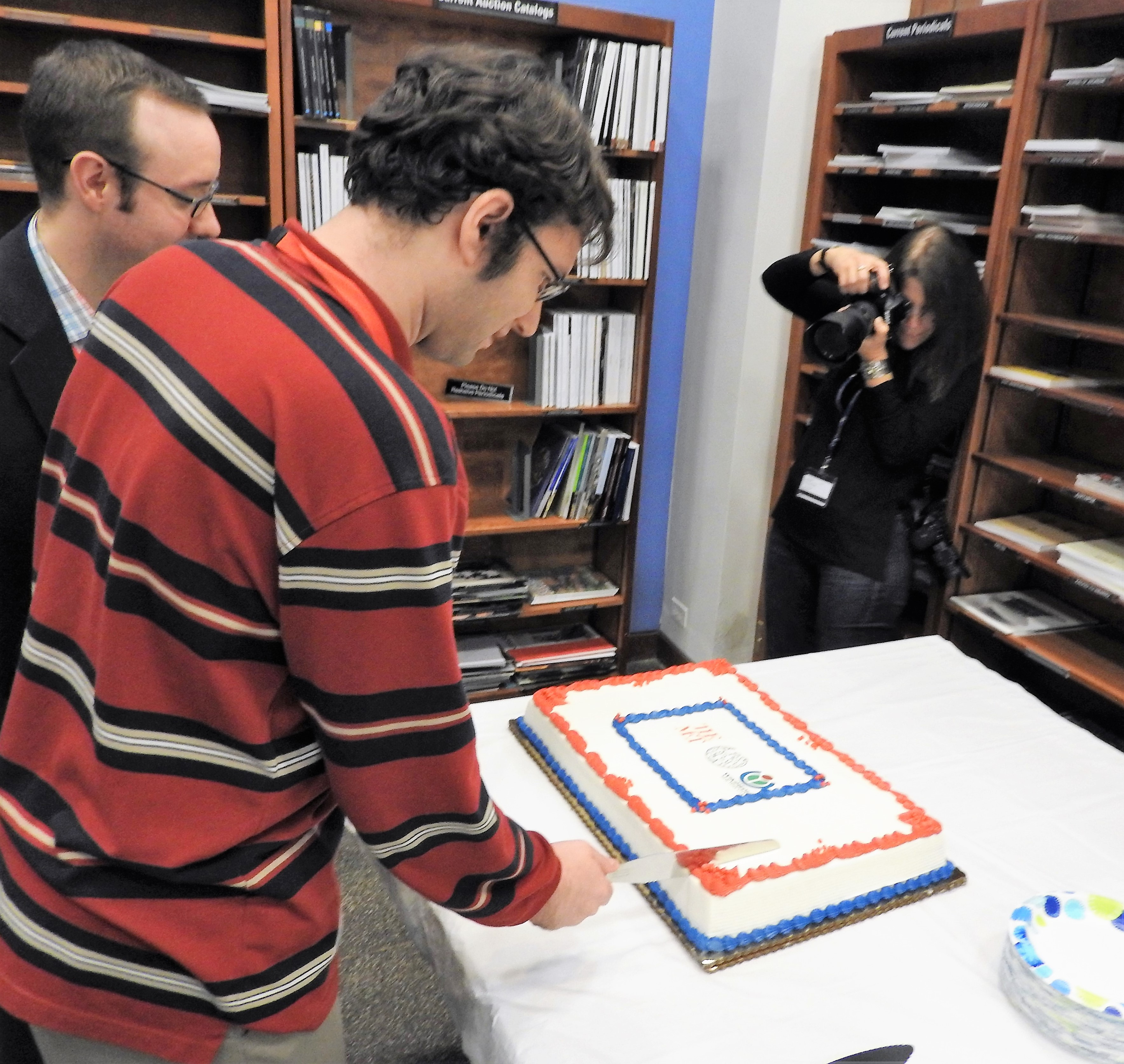
A man cutting into a sheet cake.

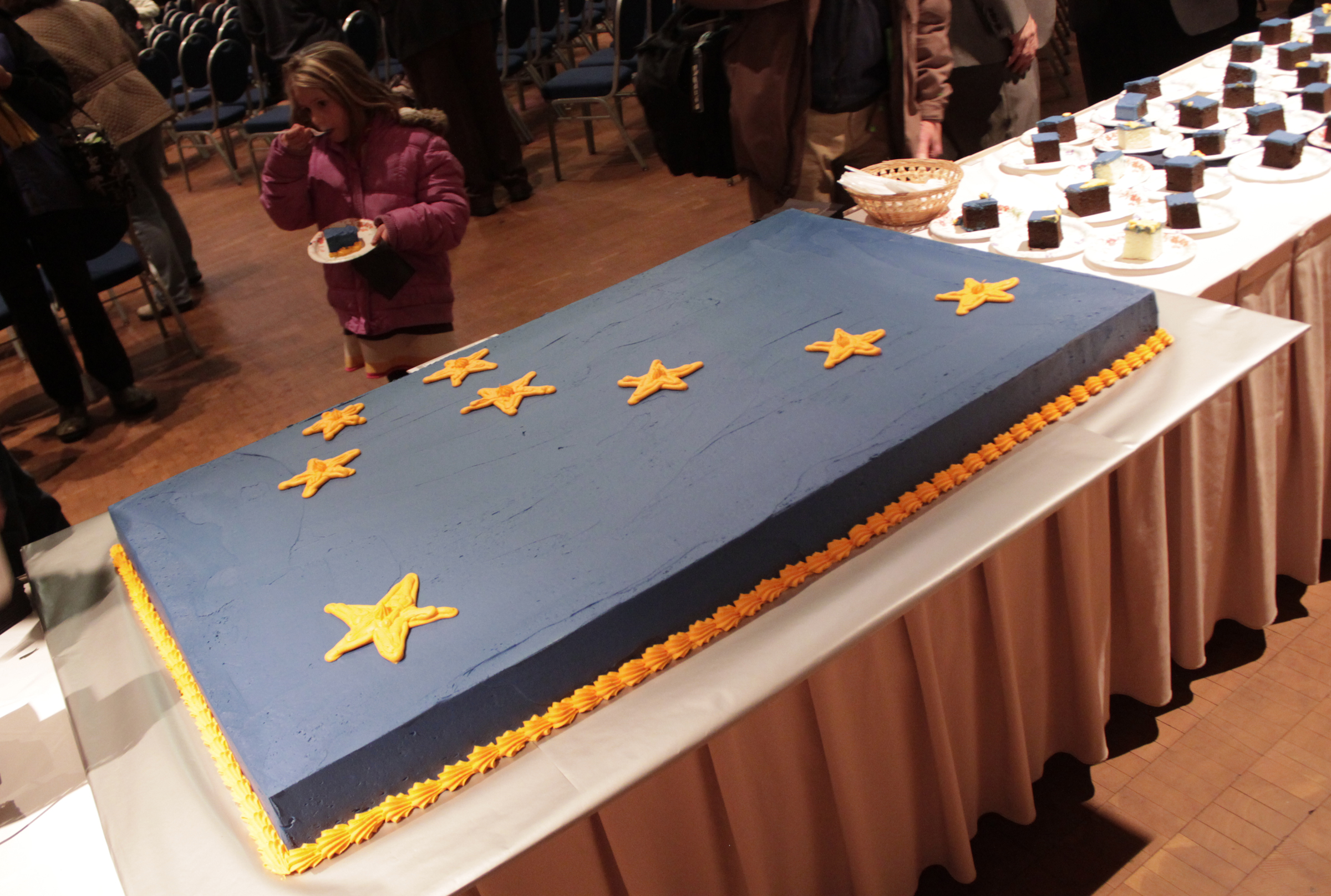
A large sheet cake, served at a political event

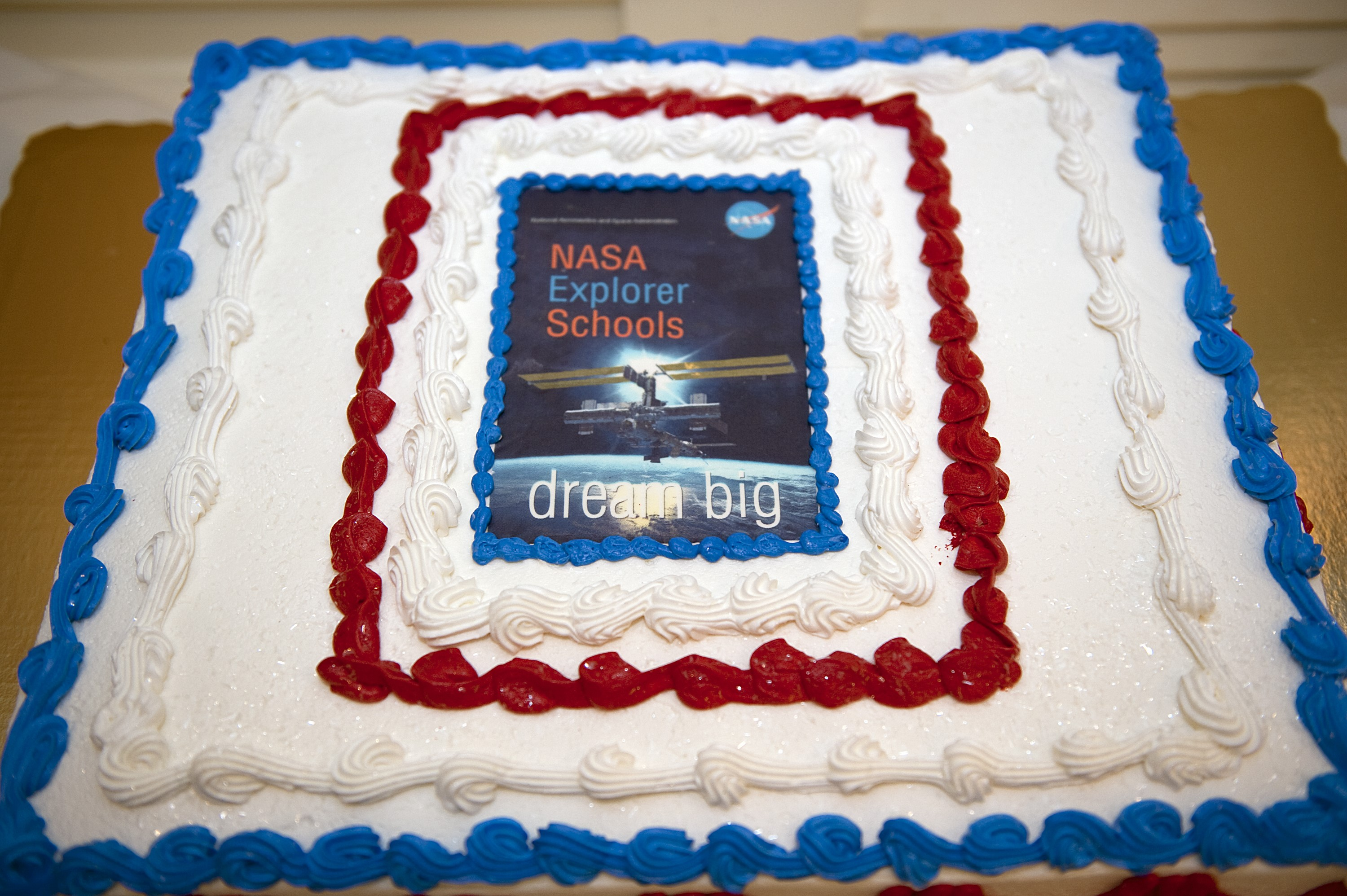
Edible ink printing can produce a photo-like decoration.

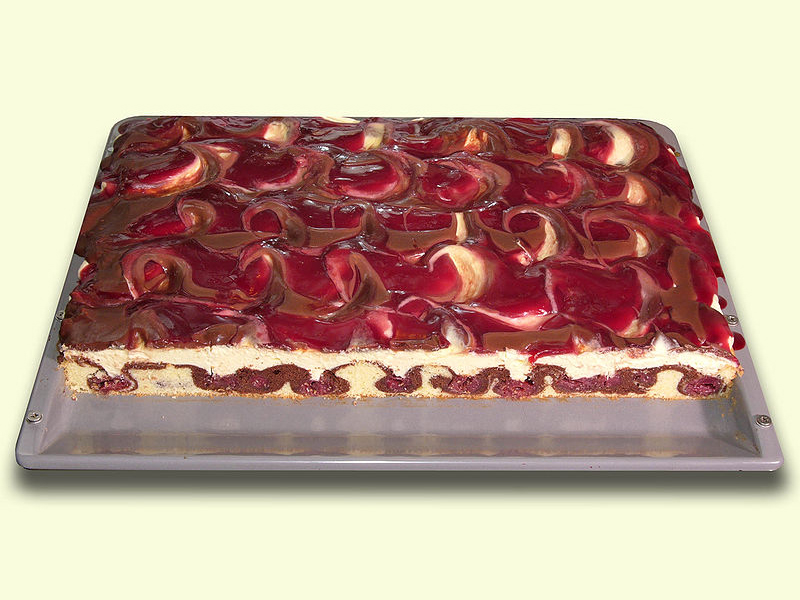
Donauwelle, a marble cake with cherries

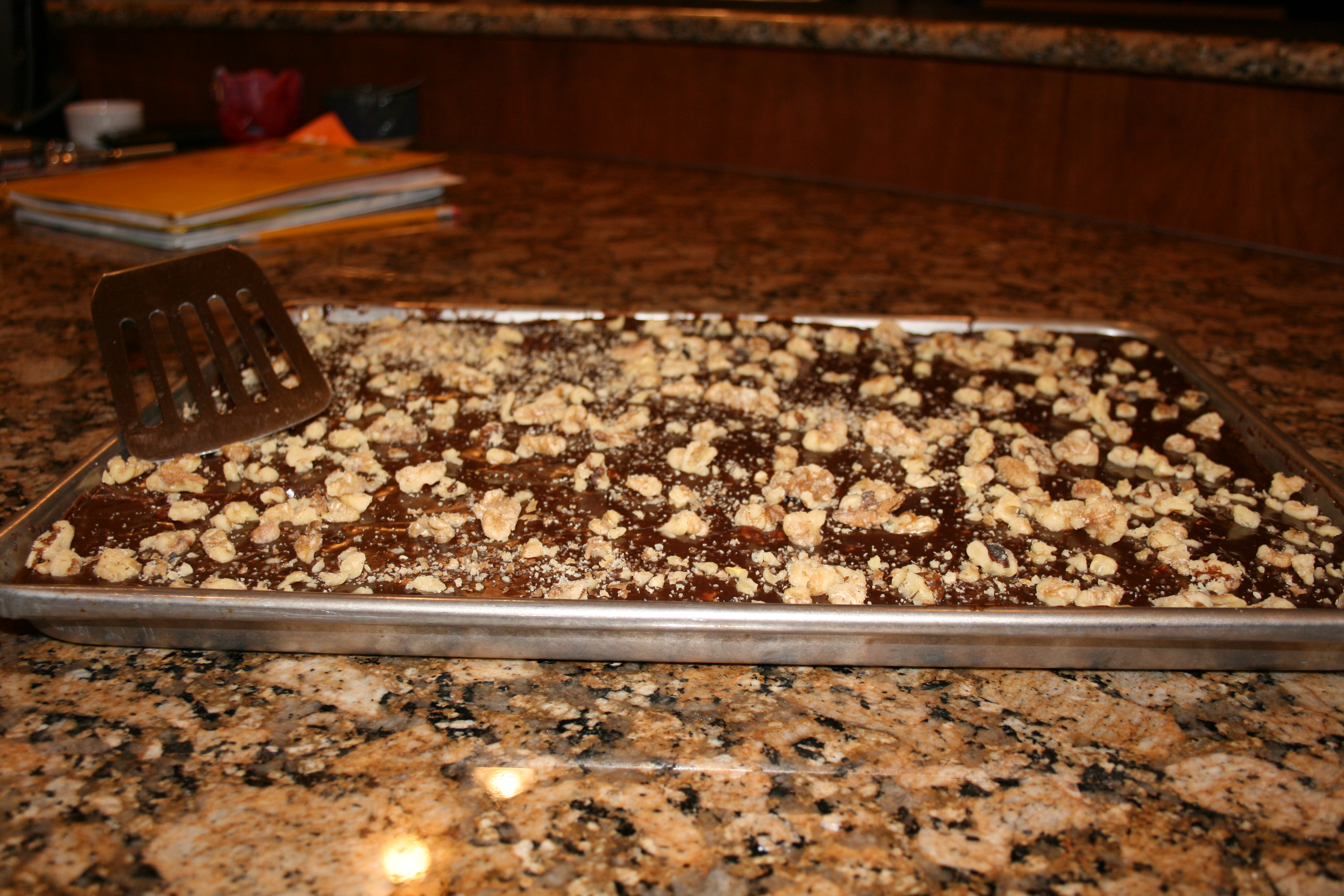
Chocolate sheet cake topped with nuts

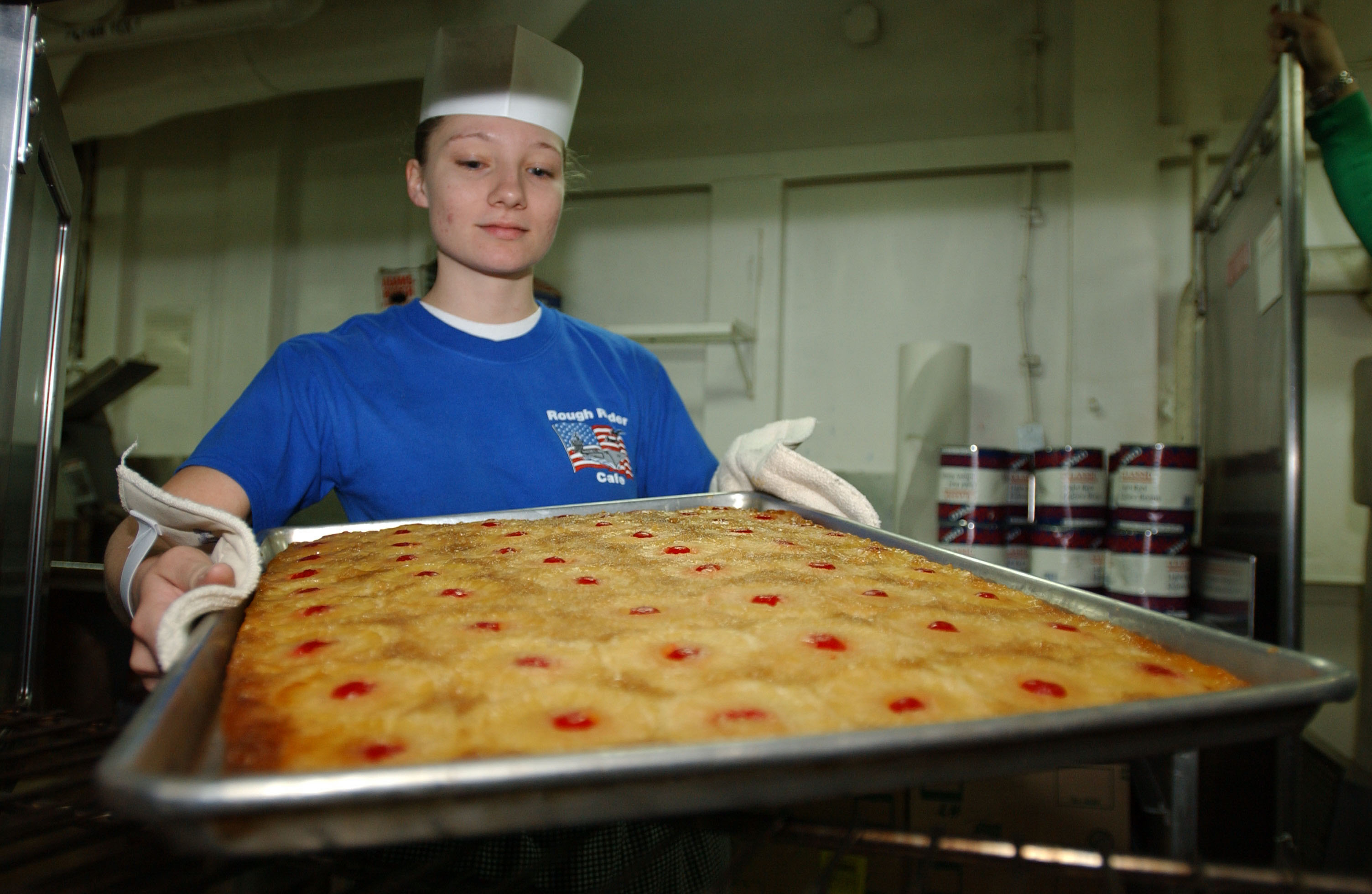
Upside-down pineapple sheet cake

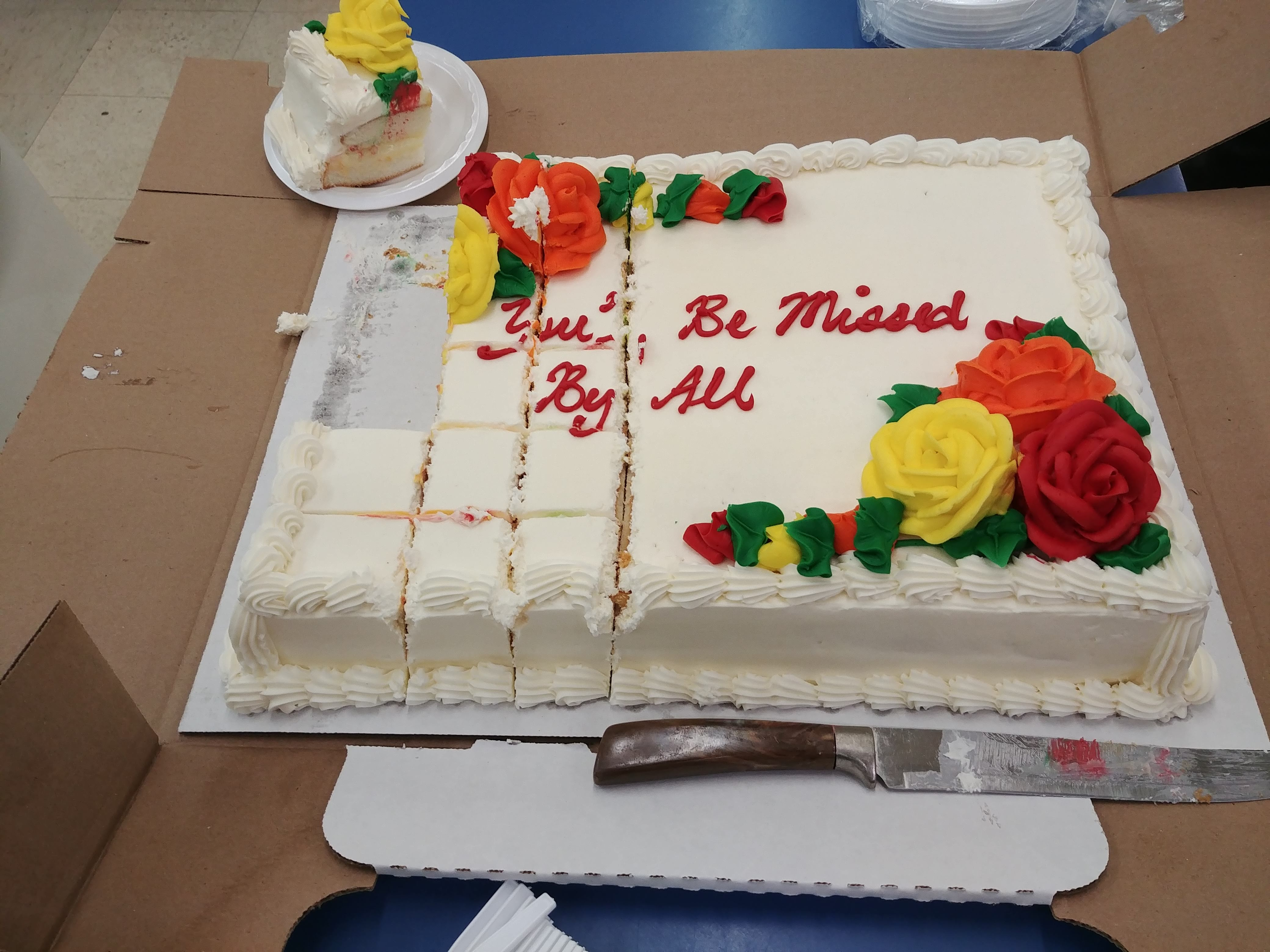
Vanilla Costco sheet cake decorated with buttercream flowers

== See also ==
- Cake decorating
- School cake, a type of sheet cake
- Swiss roll
- List of desserts
