= Wibele =

German sweet biscuit

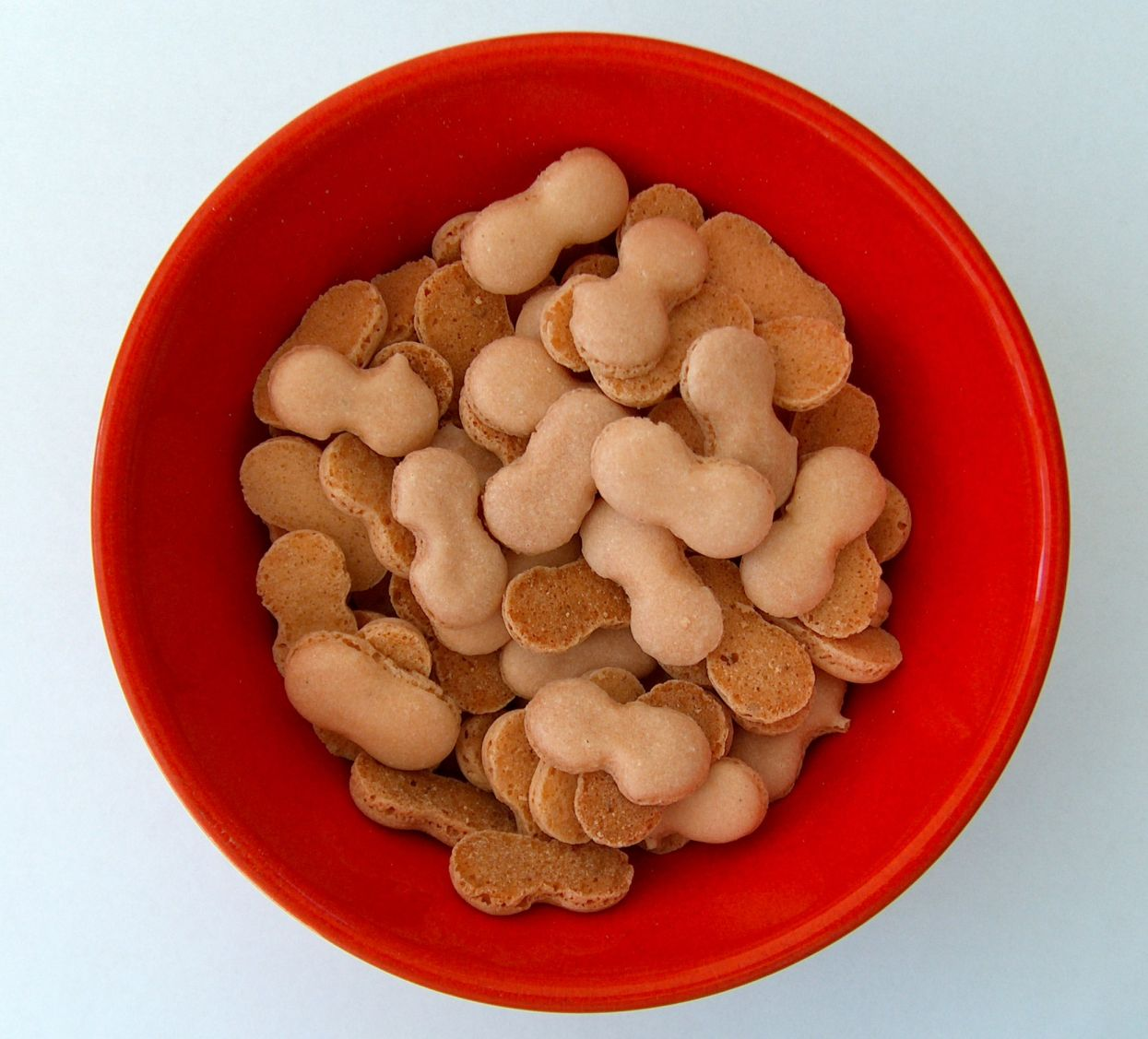
- Type: Biscuit
- Place of origin: Germany
- Region or state: Langenburg, Franconia
- Main ingredients: Flour, egg white, powdered sugar, vanilla sugar

Wibele are very small, sweet biscuits originating from the Franconian city of Langenburg in Germany, though nowadays they are considered a Swabian speciality. The dough is made from egg white, icing sugar, flour and vanilla sugar. They are similar to "Russisch Brot" ("Russian bread"), another form of German biscuit, but instead are only baked until they are slightly brown. They are in the shape of a figure 8, and are formally supposed to be 22 millimeters long and 12 millimeters wide.

They were invented by the court cook of the prince of Hohenlohe-Langenburg, Jakob Christian Carl Wibel. Café Bauer in Langenburg is the only company allowed to produce "Original Wibele", as the owner secured the rights in 1911. However, Wibele biscuits are also produced by other companies.

== See also ==
- List of German desserts
