= Bee sting (disambiguation) =

Bee sting is the sting from a bee.

Bee sting and similar may also refer to:

- "Beesting", a song by Ugly Casanova from their 2002 album Sharpen Your Teeth
- "Bee-Sting", a 2018 song by The Wombats
- "Bee Sting", a cocktail made from whiskey and vodka
- Beestings, a word for colostrum, a form of milk produced in late pregnancy when lactation starts.
- beasting, a type of Army discipline.
- Bienenstich, or Bee Sting Cake.

== See also ==
- Stinger
