= Vanilla sugar =

Dessert ingredient

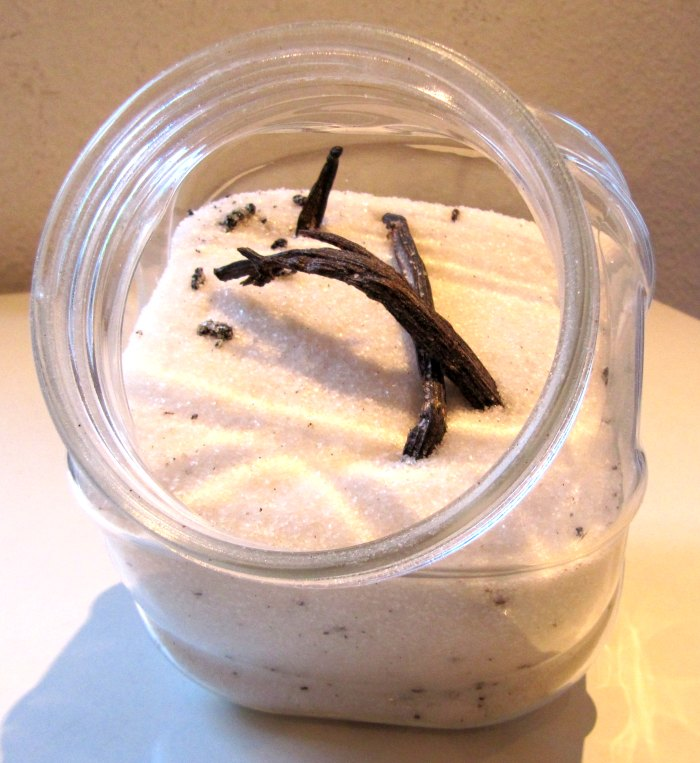
Jar full of vanilla sugar

Vanilla sugar is a commonly used ingredient in many European desserts.

Vanilla sugar is made by infusing sugar and vanilla beans, or sugar mixed with vanilla extract (in a proportion of two cups of sugar for one teaspoon of extract).

Pre-packaged vanilla sugar can be costly and difficult to obtain outside Europe but can be made at home. Typically, it is made by infusing granulated white sugar with vanilla beans (approximately, 2 cups of sugar per vanilla bean). In some cases the vanilla bean can be replaced with vanilla extract.

Vanilla sugar can be prepared by combining 400 g (2 cups) of white sugar with the scraped seeds of one vanilla bean. It can also be made by adding 1 to 2 whole vanilla beans to an airtight jar with 200 to 400 g (1 to 2 cups) of white sugar, and aging the mixture for two weeks; the sugar can be replaced as it is used.

Cheaper vanilla sugar is also available, made only from sugar and vanillin.
