= Herrencreme =

German pudding

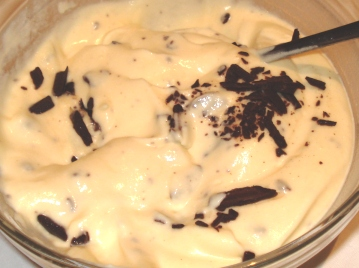
"Herrencreme"

Herrencreme is a German pudding. It is a vanilla pudding mixed with cream, chocolate shavings and a good amount of rum. Typically Herrencreme is a dessert eaten after a large meal, such as at a wedding.
