= Tollatsch =

German dessert

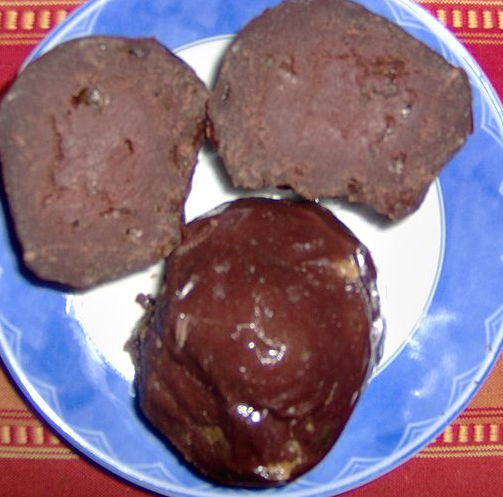
- Type: Dessert
- Place of origin: Germany
- Region or state: Pomerania
- Main ingredients: Flour, sugar, Lebkuchen spices, bread crumbs, almonds, raisins, pork blood, griebenschmalz (schmaltz, gribenes)

Tollatsch is a German dessert from the region of Pomerania. It is made of flour, sugar, a blend of Lebkuchen spices, bread crumbs, almonds, and raisins.

Tollatsch also contains the uncommon ingredients pork blood and Griebenschmalz (schmaltz with gribenes). The dough is cooked in meat broth.

== See also ==
- List of desserts
