= Welf pudding =

Two-layered German pudding

- Alternative names: Guelph pudding
- Type: Pudding
- Place of origin: Germany
- Main ingredients: milk, vanilla, egg whites; egg yolk, white wine lemon juice

Welf pudding or Guelph pudding (German: Welfenspeise or Welfenpudding), sometimes known as Hock Pudding, is a two-layered pudding from Germany. The white bottom layer is made from a cooked milk and vanilla sauce on a base of very stiffly whipped egg white. After being chilled it is then covered with a yellow layer of wine sauce made of beaten egg yolk, white wine and a little lemon juice.

Welf pudding gets its name from the colours of the House of Welf (also known as the House of Guelph), a German aristocratic family that ruled the Principality of Lüneburg in medieval times. The pudding is a culinary specialty from Lower Saxony in north Germany. It was created by a Hanoverian chef and served for the first time at the 200th anniversary of the rule of the House of Welf. It is said that it became the favourite dessert of Ernest Augustus, Elector of Hanover.

== Bibliography ==
- Bendix, Regina F.; Fenske, Michaela (2014). Politische Mahlzeiten. Political Meals. Volume 5 of Wissenschaftsforum Kulinaristik. LIT Verlag Münster. pp. 23–24. ISBN 9783643126887.
- Hassani, Nadia (2004). Spoonfuls of Germany: Culinary Delights of the German Regions in 170 Recipes. New York: Hippocrene. ISBN 978-0-7818-1057-9.
- Heuzenroeder, Angela (2002). Barossa Food. Kent, South Australia: Wakefield Press. ISBN 1-86254-461-1.
- Hirschfelder, Gunther; Mohrmann, Ruth-E, eds. (2008). Rheinisch-westfälische Zeitschrift für Volkskunde. Vol. 53. Volkskundliche Kommission für Westfalen.
- Kersting, Claudia; Neu, Erwin (2001). "Hallo Niedersachsen" kocht: die besten Rezepte von Zuschauern und Profis. Norddeutscher Rundfunk.
- Marburg, Silke; Kuenheim, Sophia, eds. (2016). Projektionsflächen von Adel. Oldenbourg: de Gruyter. ISBN 978-3-11-046356-9.
