= Bienenstich =

German layered yeast cake

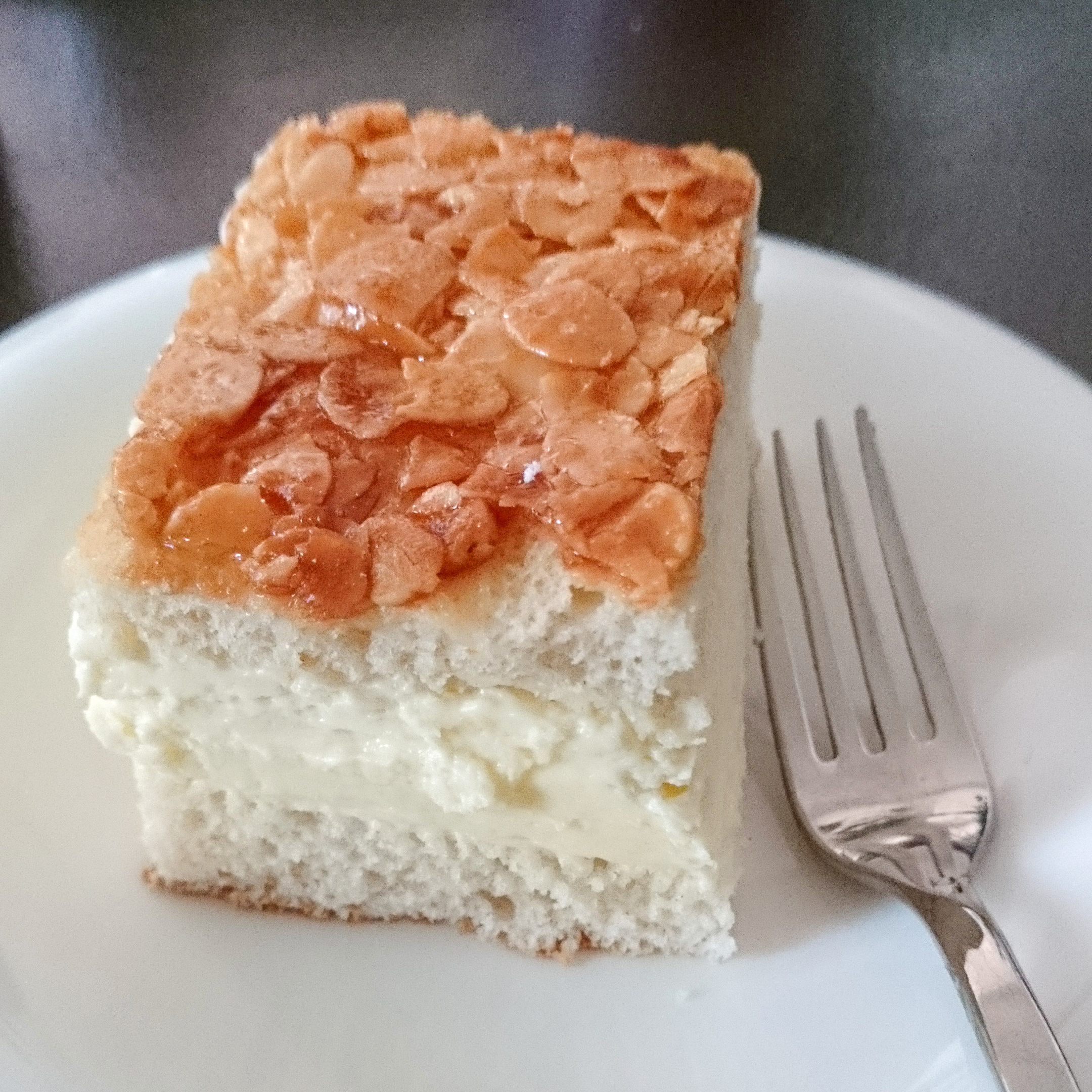
- Alternative names: Bee sting cake
- Type: Cake
- Course: Dessert
- Place of origin: Germany
- Main ingredients: Yeast dough, almonds, vanilla custard, buttercream or cream

Bienenstich (German pronunciation: [ˈbiːnənˌʃtɪç]) or bee sting cake is a German dessert cake made of a sweet yeast dough with a baked-on topping of caramelized almonds and filled with vanilla custard, buttercream, or cream. The earliest German and Swiss recipes for the cake date to the beginning of the 20th century. The dairy cream and custard filling would have required cool storage, inaccessible to most households in earlier centuries.

One source for the origin of Bienenstich cites a legend of German bakers from the 15th century who lobbed beehives at raiders from a neighboring village, successfully repelling them, and celebrated later by baking a version of this cake named after their efforts.

The foundation for this cake is a sweet yeast dough, which is rolled out finger-thick on a baking tray. On it, before baking, a roasting mass of boiled sugar or honey, fat, cream and sliced almonds is applied. The mass is applied relatively hot, otherwise it will not be spreadable. After baking and cooling, the pastry is divided horizontally.

== Name origin ==
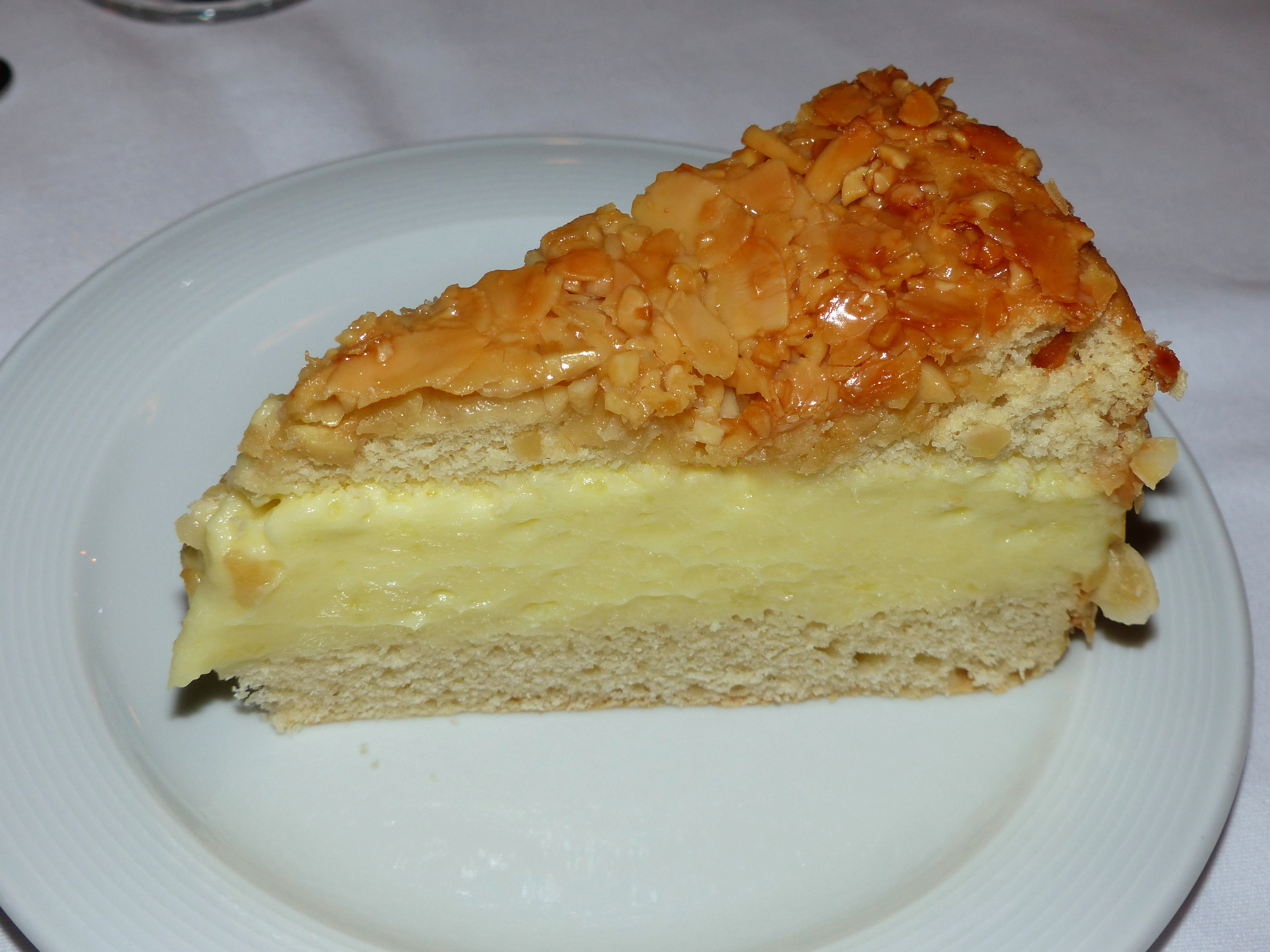
Bienenstich cake, showing the thick filling of pastry cream

The origin of the name "Bee Sting" is unclear. According to the legend of the baker's boy, in 1474 the inhabitants of Linz am Rhein planned an attack on their neighboring town of Andernach, since the Emperor had withdrawn the Rhine toll from the people of Linz and awarded it to the people of Andernach. On the morning in question, however, two baker's apprentices from Andernach walked along the city wall and ate from the bee nests hanging there. When they saw the attackers, they threw the nests at them, so that the people of Linz – stung by the bees – had to flee. A special cake was baked to celebrate – the bee sting. In the text of Karl Simmrock's baker's boy saga, however, there is still no reference to the bee sting. By at least 1962, the baker boy saga was directly linked to the dates of the invention of the bee sting cake.

The saga is probably a much later origin legend. Necessary for the storage of cakes with perishable cream filling are cooling mechanisms, which were available in only a few households before the 19th century. Most of the cream cakes known today date from the 19th century. The existence of bee sting cake in the German Empire is documented shortly after 1900. In 1913, а cookbook by the Baden Women's Association, the word bee sting still primarily refers to the roasted mass. Early bee sting recipes presumably mostly did not contain any filling, since the Deutsche Frauen-Zeitschrift (Graz) of 1914 made a special reference to this: "Sometimes the bee sting is also filled." In 1925 the Dr. Oetker company, advertising their baking books with individual recipes, described the bee sting as "suitable for every season", "extraordinarily inexpensive" and "not yet generally known pastry". It is also pointed out that a buttercream filling is possible. In the newly edited version of the German Dictionary, the word bee sting, meaning cake, is referenced to a passage from Alfred Döblin's 1929 novel Berlin Alexanderplatz. In Switzerland, a cake by the name of Bienenstich is documented from the 20th century. The first mention in a confectionery handbook is only documented for the year 1944.

== Retail sales ==
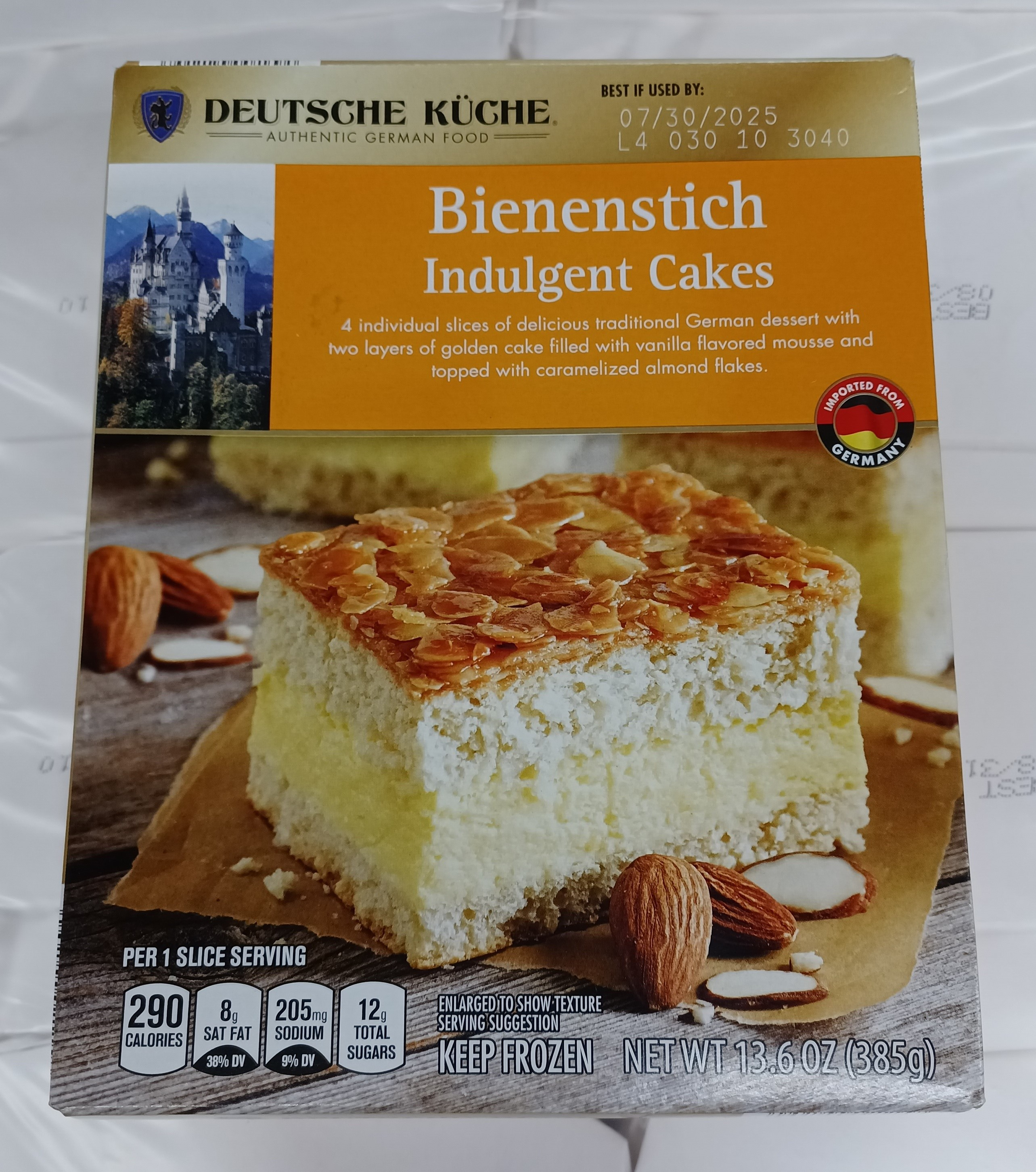
A package of Deutsche Küche Bienenstich

In the United States, Aldi sells packaged Bienenstich under its Deutsche Küche brand.

== See also ==
- German cuisine
- List of German desserts
- List of almond dishes
- List of custard desserts
