= Donauwelle =

Sheet cake from Germany and Austria

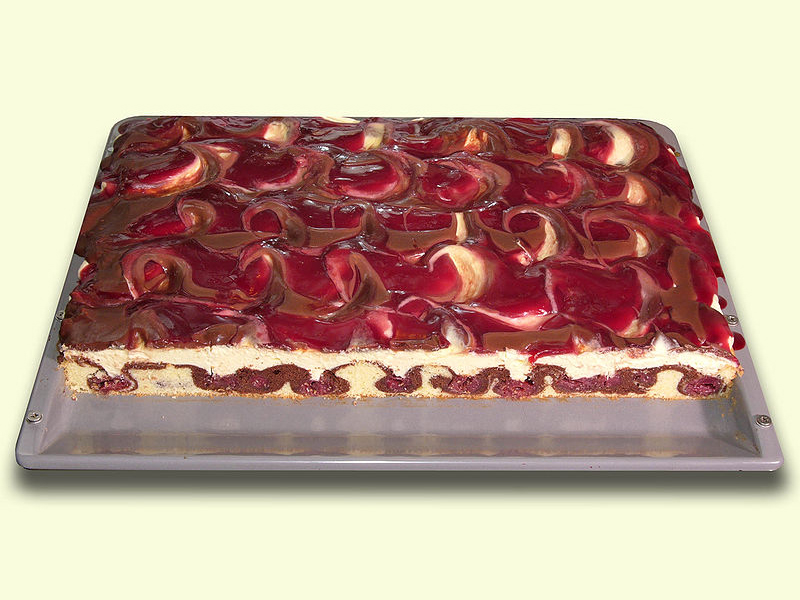
- Alternative names: Schneewittchenkuchen; Schneewittchentorte
- Type: Cake
- Place of origin: Germany and Austria
- Main ingredients: Flour, butter, eggs and sugar, sour cherries, buttercream, cocoa and chocolate

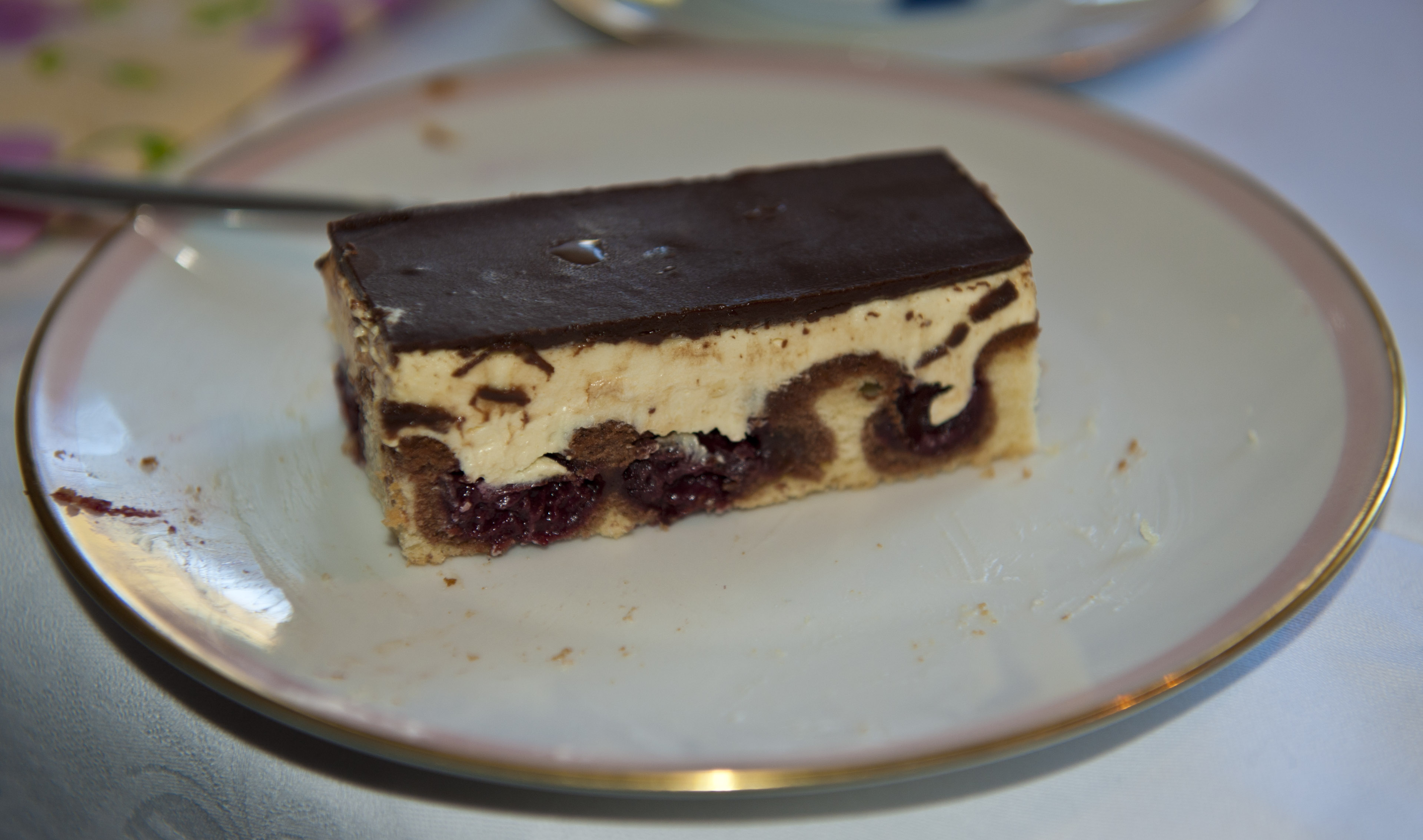

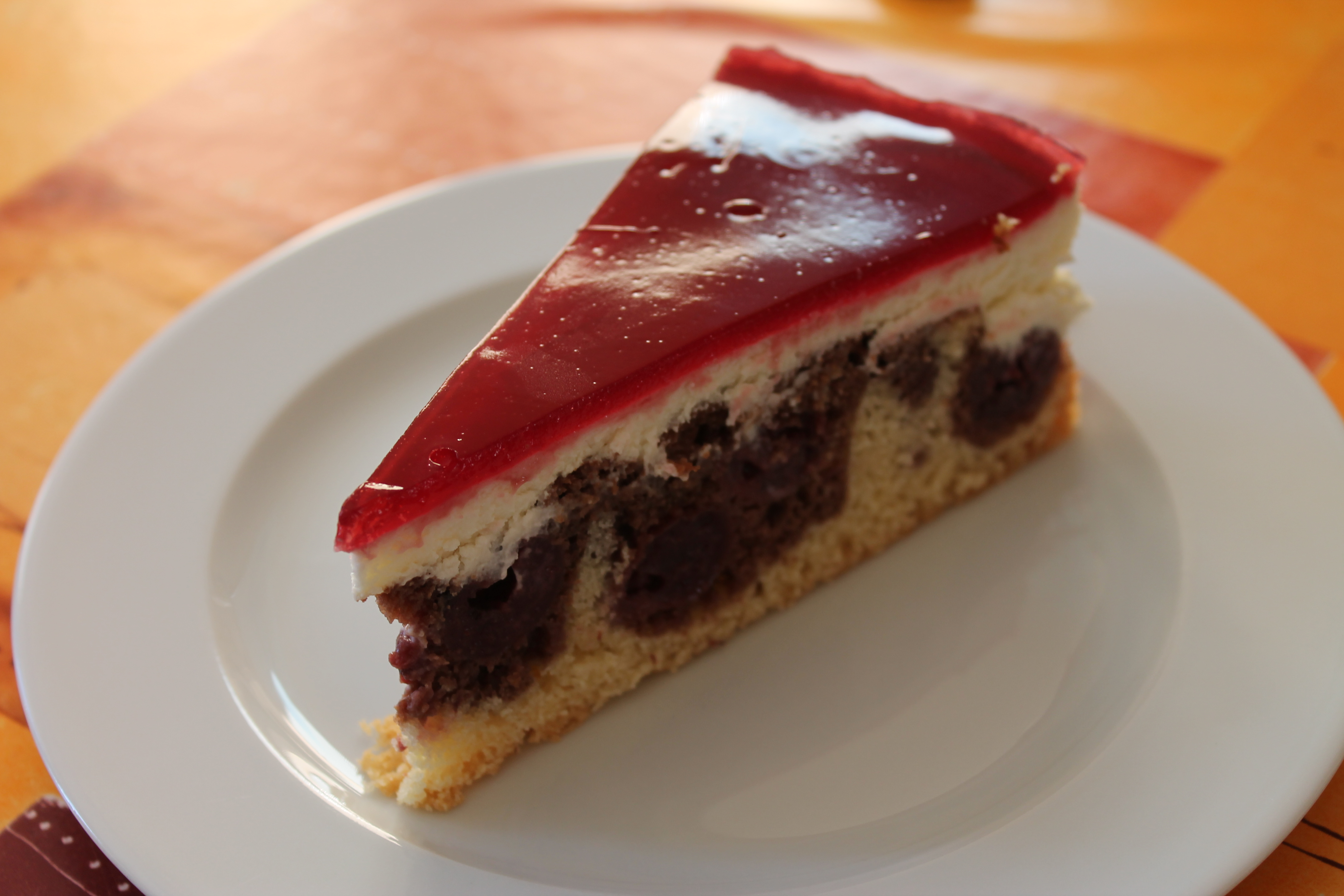

Donauwelle (German pronunciation: [ˈdoːnaʊ̯ˌvɛlə], lit. 'Danube wave') is a traditional sheet cake popular in Germany and Austria. It is made of layers of plain and chocolate pound cake combined to have a wavy border between them. It contains sour cherries and is topped with buttercream and chocolate glaze.

== Naming ==
The cake's name comes from its wavy pattern inside and its swirled chocolate decoration, although the reason for naming it after the Danube in particular is not clear. It could refer to its popularity in those countries that the river flows through.

Other names for the cake are Schneewittchenkuchen, meaning 'Snow White cake', and Schneewittchentorte, referring to its color scheme of black, white and red, like the character of Snow White in the Brothers Grimm's fairy tale.

== Preparation ==
The batter is a pound cake, a cake made of equal amounts by weight of butter, flour, eggs and sugar, which is then divided into two parts, one of which is colored with cocoa.

The two batters are spread in layers onto the baking sheet, the chocolate batter above the plain batter, before the top is strewn with sour cherries. During baking, the cherries sink to the bottom of the cake, causing the wavy pattern.

After the cake has cooled it is decorated with a thick layer of buttercream and iced with a chocolate glaze which may then be ornamented in a wavy manner with a fork.
