= Marble cake =

Cake

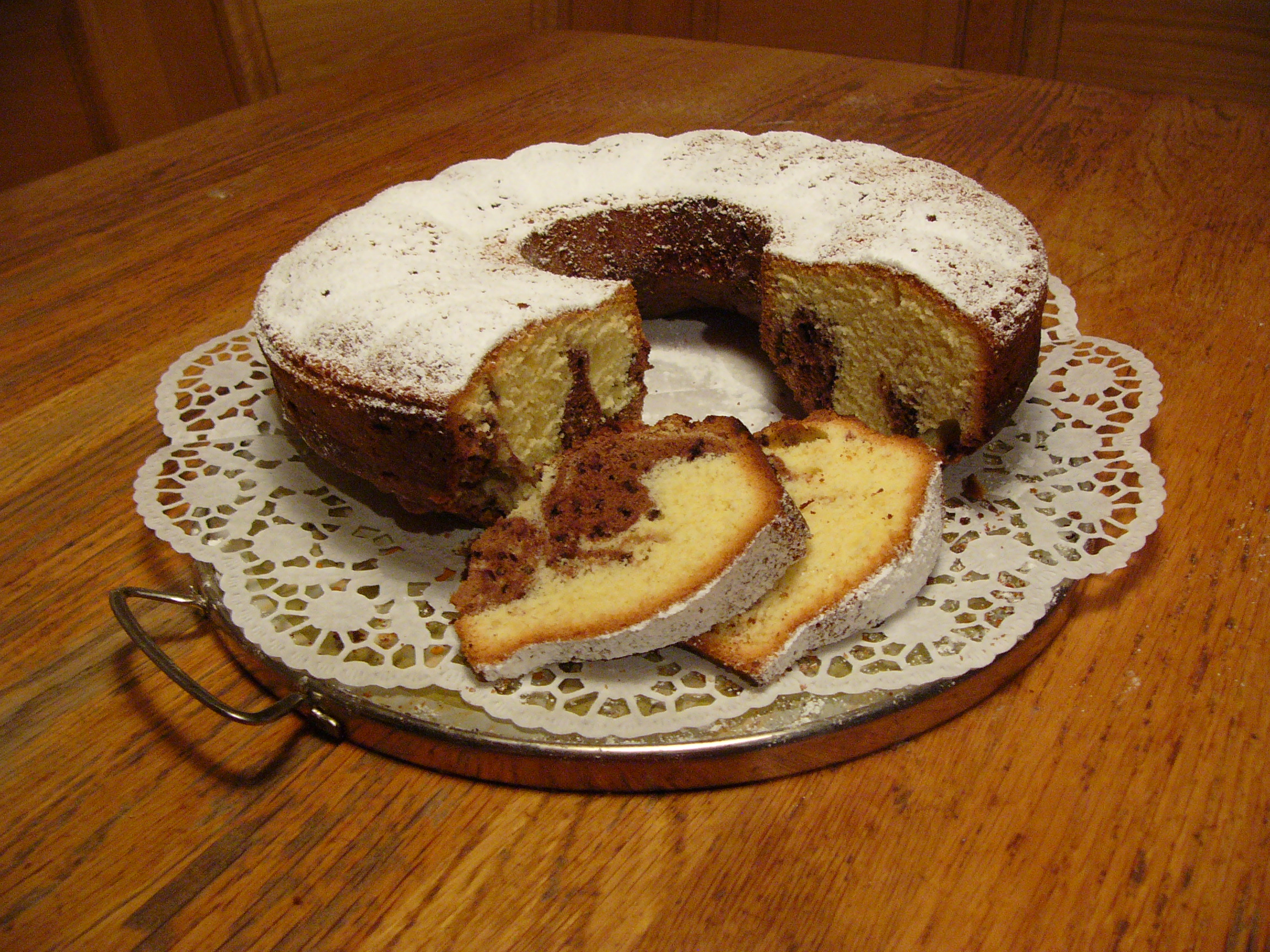
- Type: Cake
- Place of origin: Germany
- Main ingredients: Light and dark batter

A marble cake (German: Marmorkuchen, pronounced [ˈmaʁmoːɐ̯ˌkuːxn̩]), or Marmor (German: [ˈmaʁmoːɐ̯] lit. 'marble') is a cake with a streaked or mottled appearance (like marble) achieved by very lightly blending light and dark batter. Due to its zebra-striped pattern, it is also called zebra cake. It can be a mixture of vanilla and chocolate cake, in which case it is mainly vanilla, with streaks of chocolate. Other possibilities are strawberry or other fruit flavors, or (particularly in marbled coffee cakes) cinnamon or other spices.

== History ==
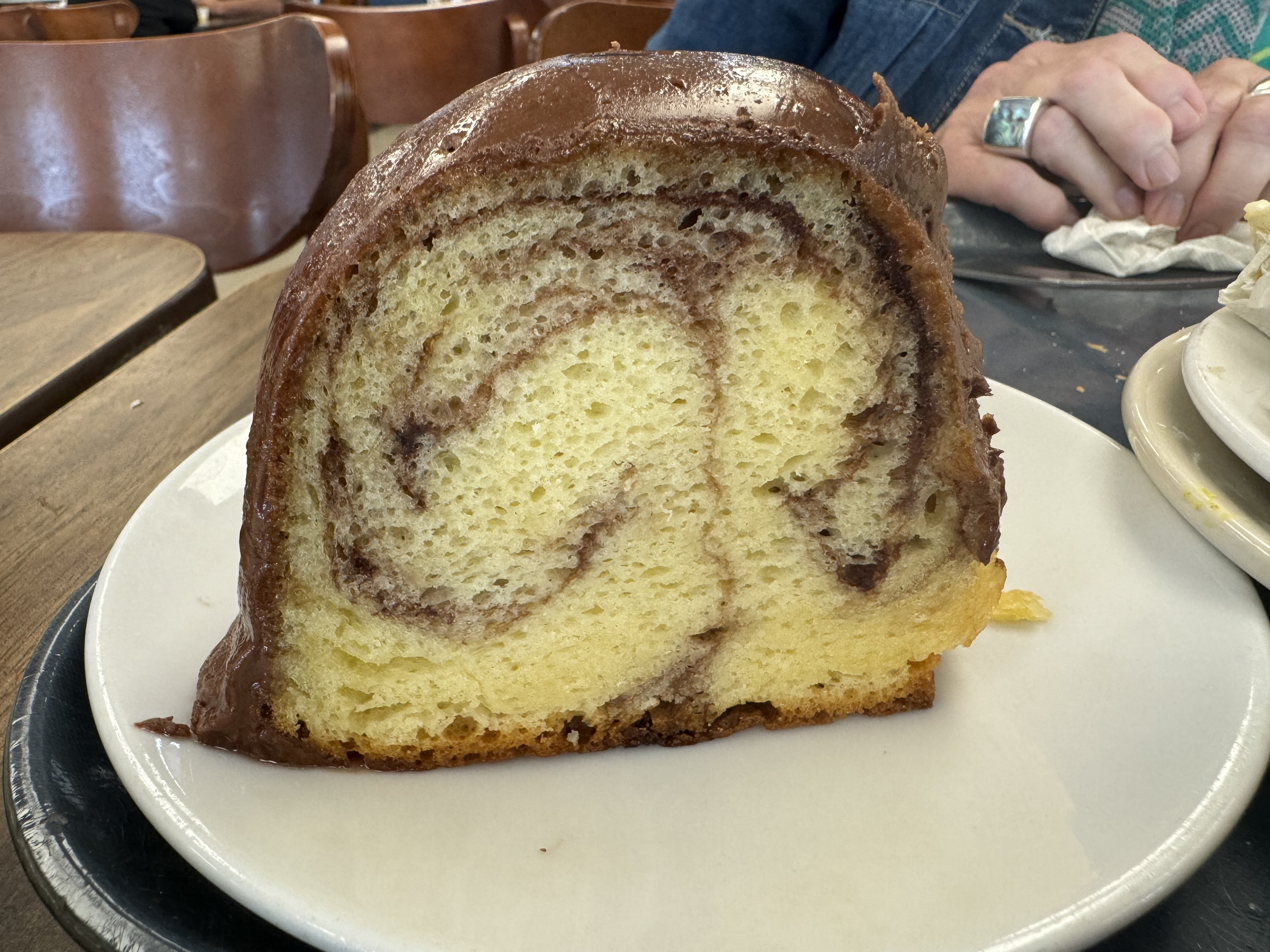
Marble cake baked in a Bundt pan, sliced to show the marble-like pattern inside the cake

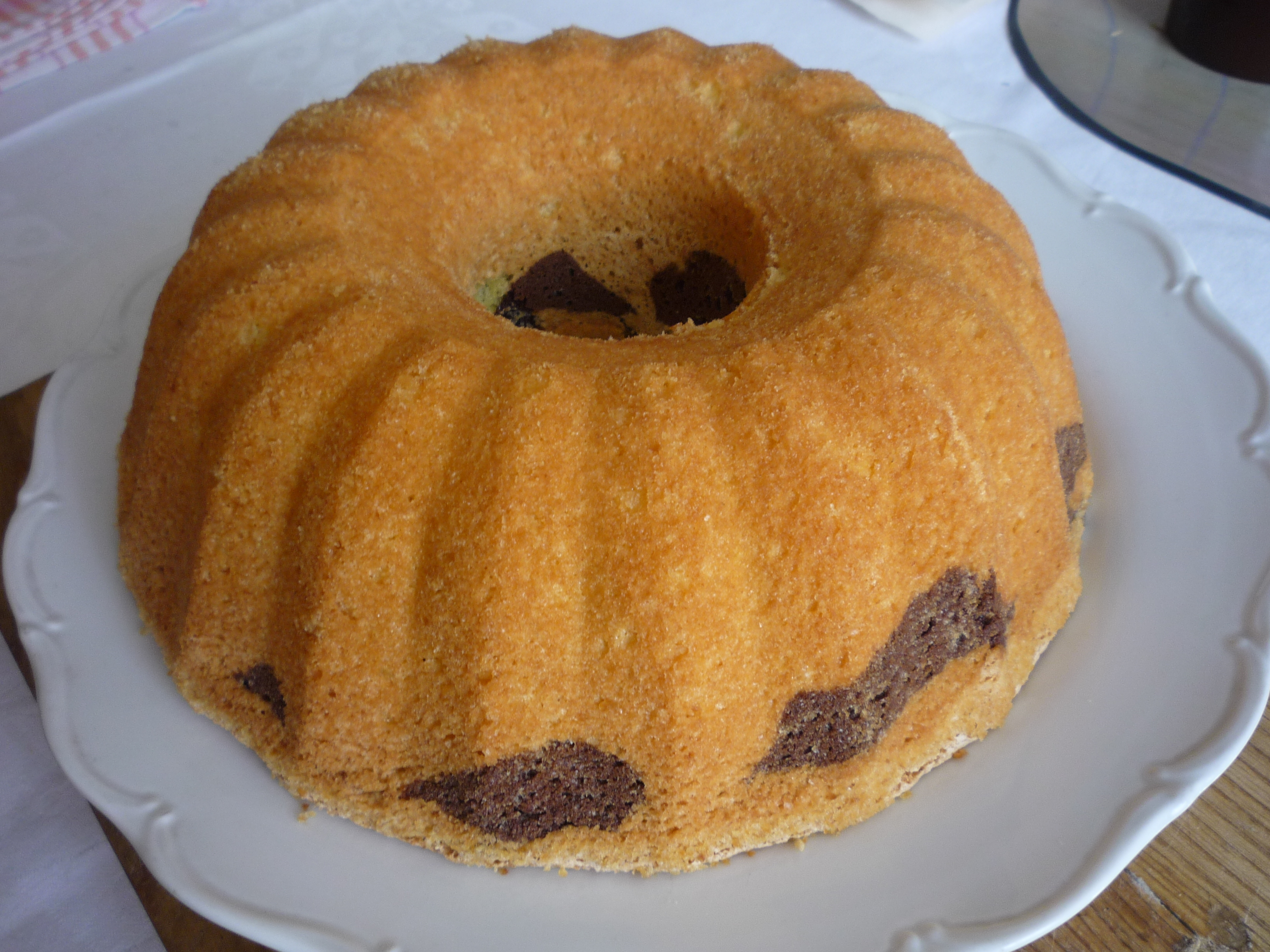
Before the cake is cut, the interior pattern may not be apparent.

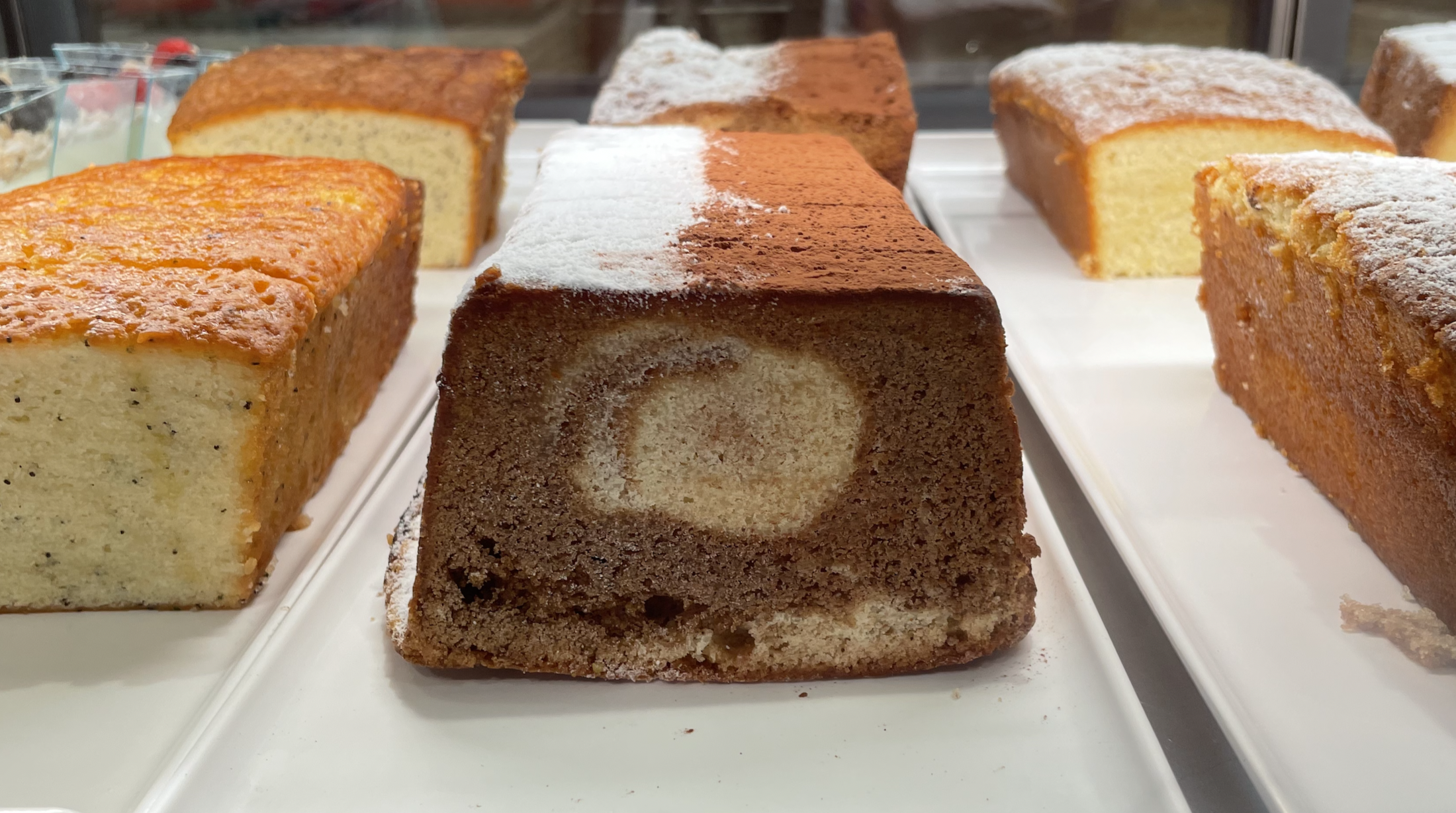
Coffee-flavored marble loaf cake

Marmor is the German word for marble. The idea of marble cake seems to have originated in early nineteenth century Germany. The earliest version of marble cake consisted of a kugelhopf (sweet yeast bread), one half of which was colored with molasses and spices to achieve a dark colored batter. Bakers next began to do the same thing with sponge cake batter. The usage of chocolate in the Rhein-Ruhr area in the twentieth century has now made this a common version of marble cake across Germany and Austria.

The cake was brought to America shortly before the Civil War, and the term marble cake was first recorded in English in September 29, 1859 issue of Illinois State Chronicle (Decatur). One popular variation of this recipe during Victorian times was “Harlequin cake,” which was baked with checkerboard patterns.

== Use as an academic metaphor ==
In the field of geology, the "Marble Cake Mantle" model refers to the theory of an earth wherein "elongated strips of subducted oceanic lithosphere... are stretched and thinned by the normal and shear strains in the convecting mantle, and are destroyed by being reprocessed at ocean ridges or, on the centimetre scale, by dissolution processes."

In politics, marble cake federalism, also known as cooperative federalism, is defined in contrast to dual federalism, also known as layer cake federalism. The metaphor of marble cake is meant to conceptualize how local, state, and federal governments have interacting, interrelated policy goals. The term was coined by American political scientist Morton Grodzins.

== World records ==
In 2019, British-American television host John Oliver unveiled a 600 sq ft (56 m^{2}) marble cake on an episode of his comedy series Last Week Tonight with John Oliver, featuring an image of Turkmenistan's autocratic president Gurbanguly Berdimuhamedow falling off a horse during a race. This was intended to satirize Berdimuhamedow's penchant for amassing world records.

Oliver's cake was submitted to Guinness World Records for the biggest marble cake depicting a man falling off of a horse, but was denied – one of the conditions for certification was a non-disparagement agreement against Guinness, including its relationships with authoritarian regimes, which Oliver described as "clearly ridiculous".
