= Buttercream =

Sweet filling made with butter

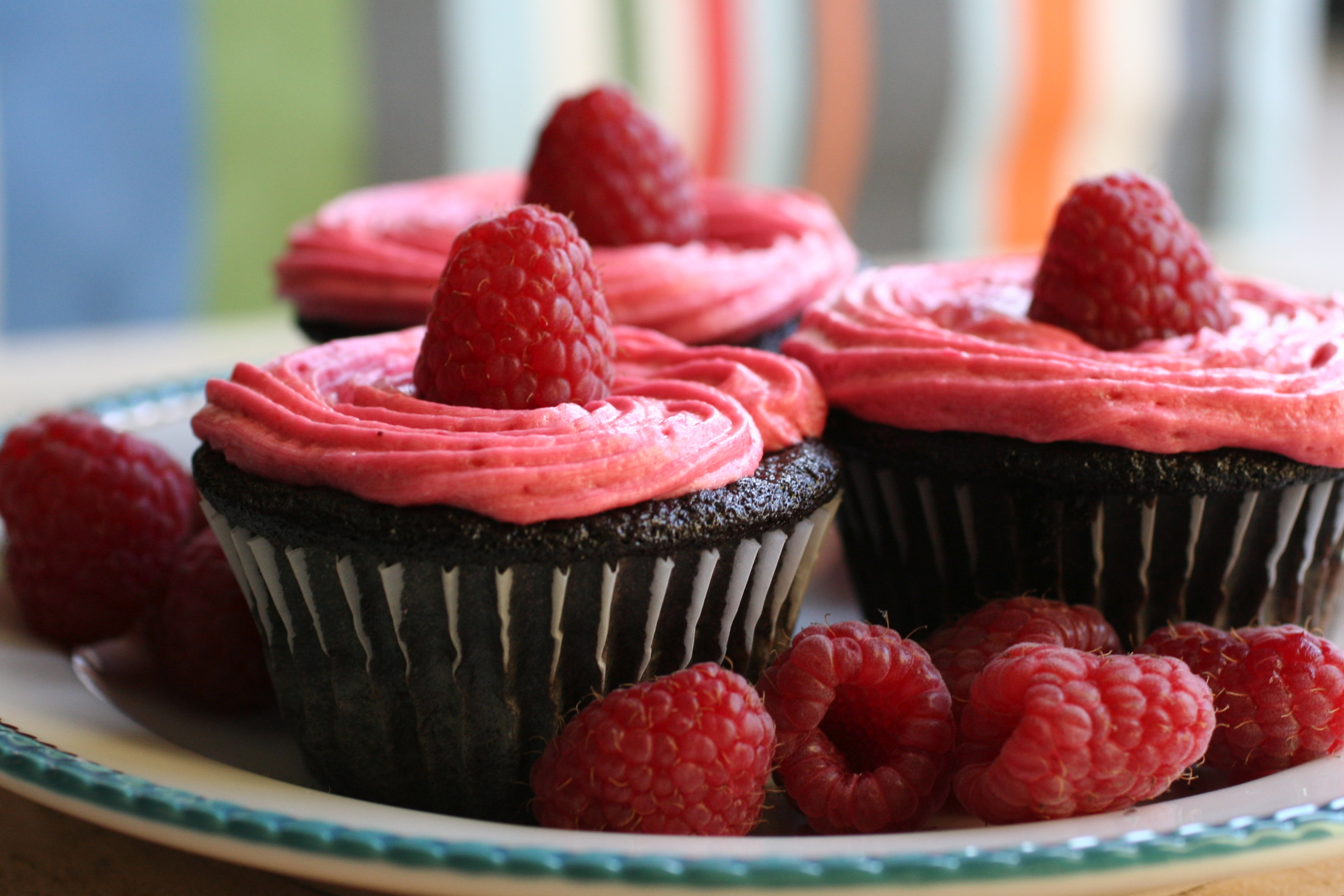
- Chocolate cupcakes with raspberry buttercream
- Alternative names: Butter Icing
- Type: Icing or filling
- Main ingredients: Fats (usually butter; sometimes lard or margarine), powdered sugar

Buttercream, also referred to as butter icing or butter frosting, is a type of icing used for either filling, coating or decorating cakes. The main ingredients are butter and some type of sugar.

Buttercream is commonly flavored with vanilla. Other common flavors are chocolate, fruits, and other liquid extracts. Food coloring is commonly added if the buttercream is being used as decoration. Buttercream can be piped or spread in decorative patterns and shapes.

== Varieties ==
=== American buttercream or mock cream ===
American buttercream or mock cream is a simple buttercream made by creaming together butter and powdered sugar to the desired consistency and lightness. Some or all of the butter can be replaced with margarine, or shortening. A small amount of milk or cream is added to adjust the texture. Usually twice as much sugar as butter by weight is used. Some recipes also call for powdered milk or meringue powder.

Compared to other types of buttercream, American buttercream has fewer ingredients, and is quicker and easier to make. It is also sweeter because of the high amount of sugar. Because it does not have an egg or cooked base, it is less stable and melts more easily in warm temperatures.

In Puerto Rico, American frosting is traditionally used in bizcocho Mojadito. The mix of shortening, butter, heavy whipping cream, and powdered sugar helps to withstand tropical heat. Almond and vanilla pasta are added as well for flavoring.

=== Meringue-based buttercream ===
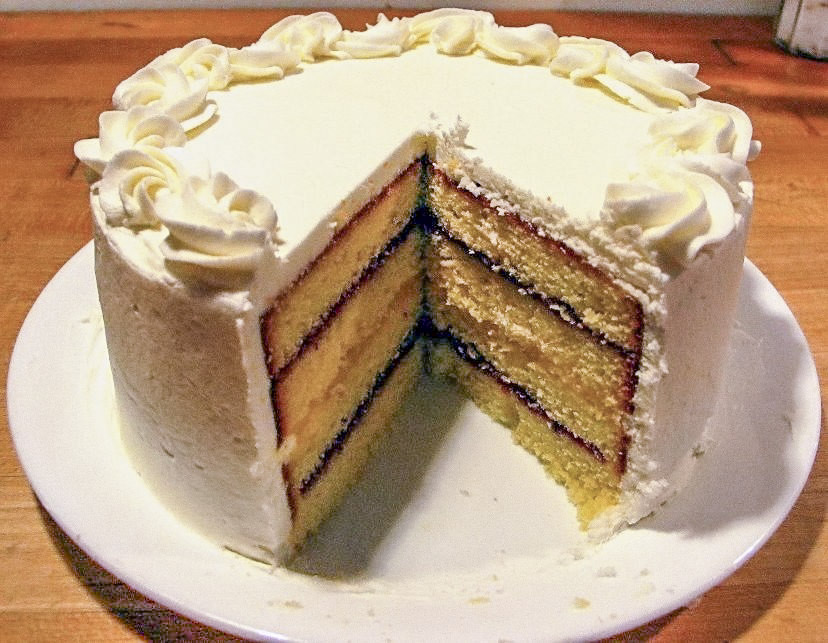
A layered pound cake with an outermost layer of uncolored buttercream

Meringue buttercream is made by beating softened butter with either Italian or Swiss meringue until the mixture is emulsified and light. The meringue must be cooled to room temperature in order not to melt the butter (which has a variable melting point below 35 °C (95 °F)) as it is subsequently beaten in.

The meringue gives buttercream a structure that is more stable in warm temperatures.

==== Swiss meringue buttercream ====
Swiss meringue is made by heating granulated sugar and egg whites until the sugar dissolves, then whipping it until it forms a meringue. The meringue is then whipped with butter and flavorings.

==== Italian meringue buttercream ====
Italian meringue is made by drizzling a hot sugar syrup into already whipped egg whites while continuing to whip. The meringue is then whipped with butter and flavorings.

=== Other varieties ===
==== Ermine frosting (flour buttercream) ====
Ermine frosting is also known as boiled milk frosting or cooked flour frosting. It is made by cooking flour and milk until it becomes a thick paste or roux. The cooked milk mixture is then beaten with butter until light.

Ermine frosting is considered to be old-fashioned, and is less common than other types of buttercream. It is less sweet and has a texture similar to whipped cream. Traditionally, ermine frosting was used to frost red velvet cake.

==== French buttercream ====
French buttercream (also known as pâte à bombe–based buttercream or common buttercream) is made with whipped egg yolks.

==== German buttercream ====
Custard-based buttercream, also known as German buttercream or crème mousseline, is prepared by beating together pastry cream and softened butter, and may be additionally sweetened with extra confectioners' sugar.

==== Russian buttercream ====
Russian buttercream is made by whipping butter and condensed milk. It is richer and has a more dairy focused flavor.

== See also ==
- List of butter dishes
