= List of almond dishes =

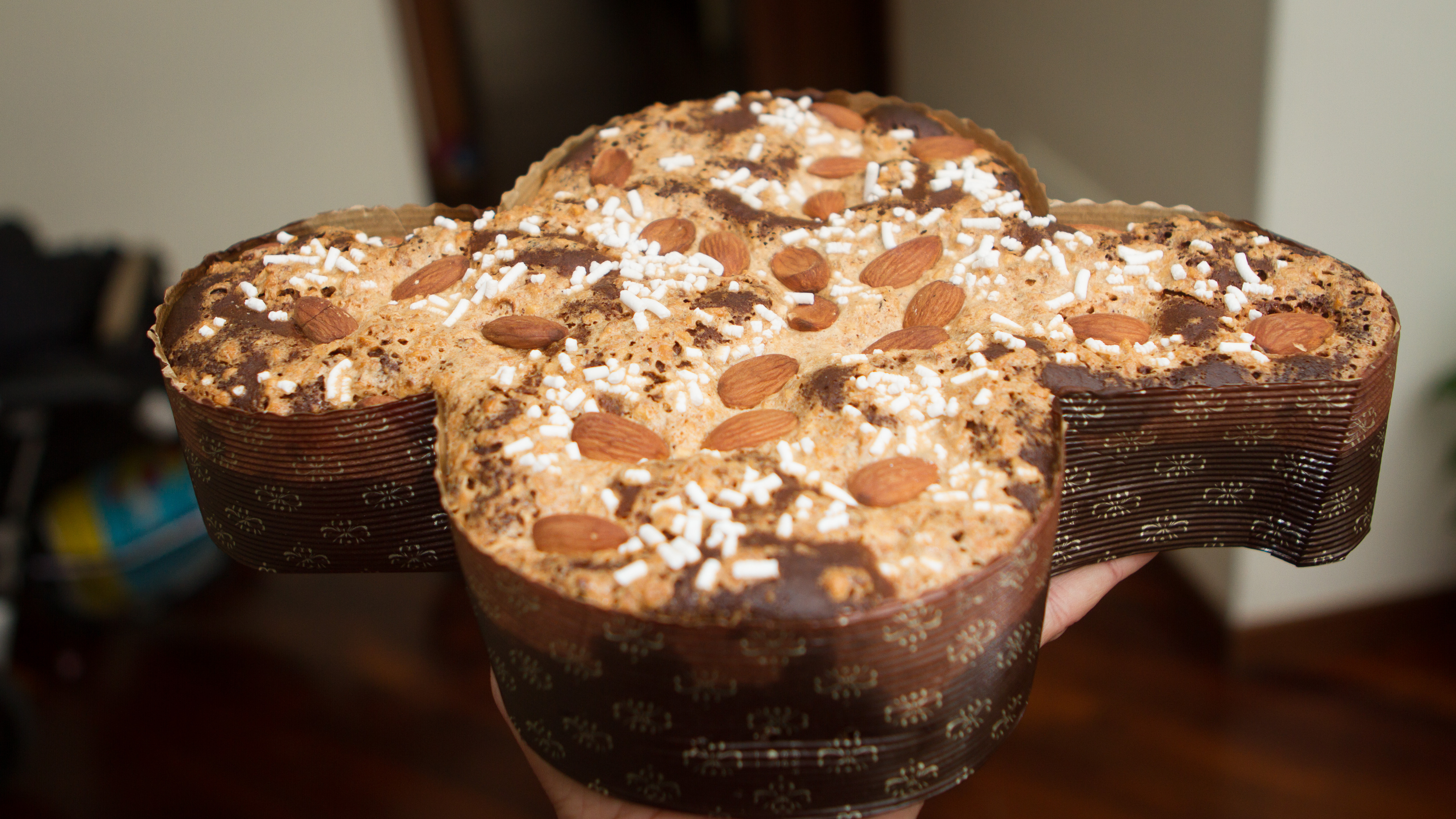
Colomba pasquale, the Italian Easter bread. It is the Easter counterpart of the two well-known Italian Christmas desserts, panettone and pandoro.

This is a list of almond foods and dishes, which use almond as a primary ingredient. The almond is a species of tree native to the Middle East and South Asia. "Almond" is also the name of the edible and widely cultivated seed of this tree. Within the genus Prunus, it is classified with the peach in the subgenus Amygdalus, distinguished from the other subgenera by the corrugated shell (endocarp) surrounding the seed. The fruit of the almond is a drupe, consisting of an outer hull and a hard shell with the seed (which is not a true nut) inside.

== Almond foods and dishes ==
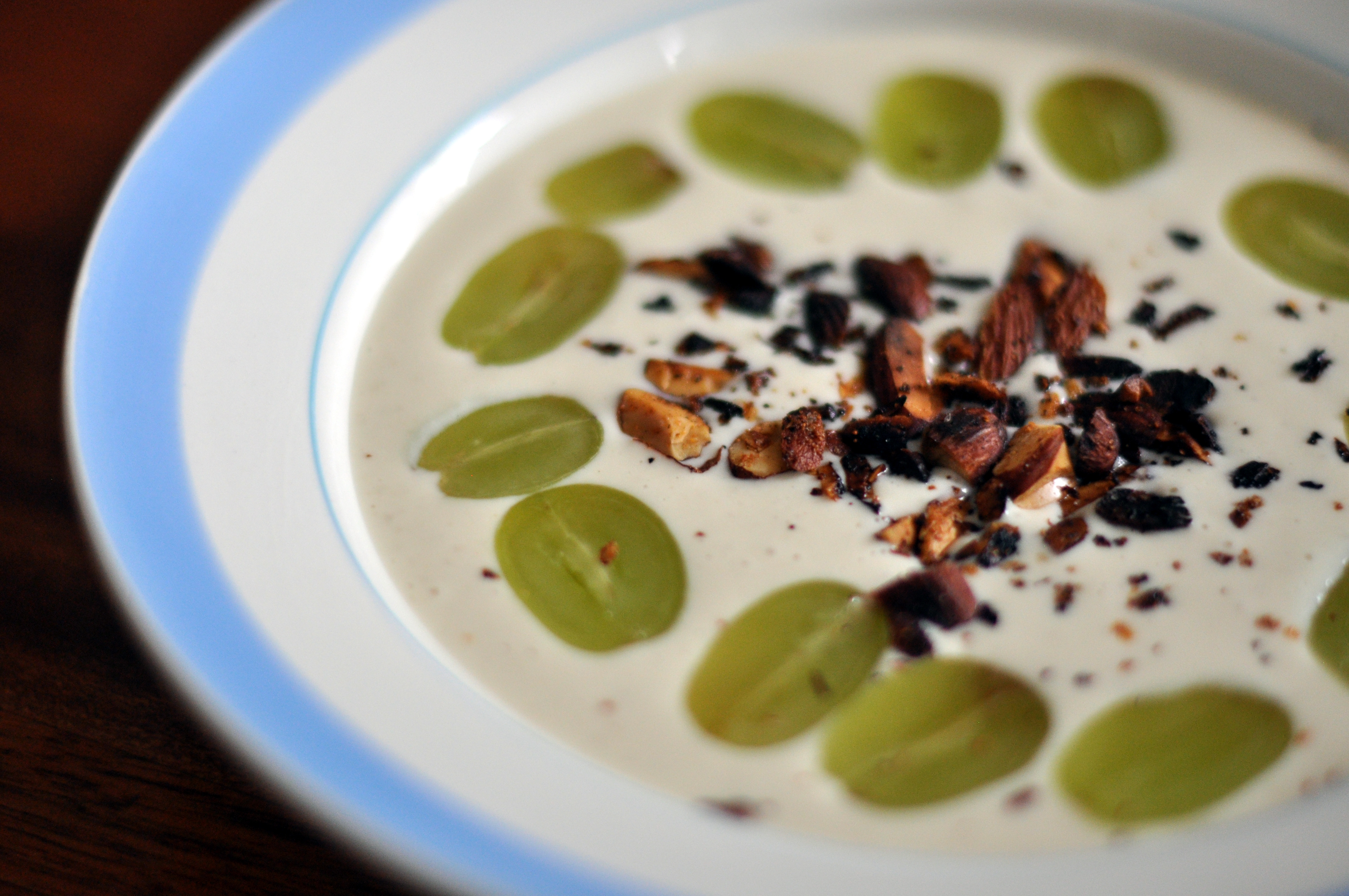
Ajoblanco is a popular andalusian cold soup made of bread, crushed almonds, garlic, water, olive oil, salt and sometimes vinegar.

- Ajoblanco – Type of cold soup from Andalusia, Spain
- Almond tofu – East Asian jellied dessert traditionally made from apricot kernel milk
- Alpen (food) – Breakfast cereal made by Weetabix
- Amandine (culinary term)
- Amlu – Moroccan spread of almonds, oil, honey
- Bakewell tart – English shortcrust pastry
- Bear claw – Pastry with almond paste filling

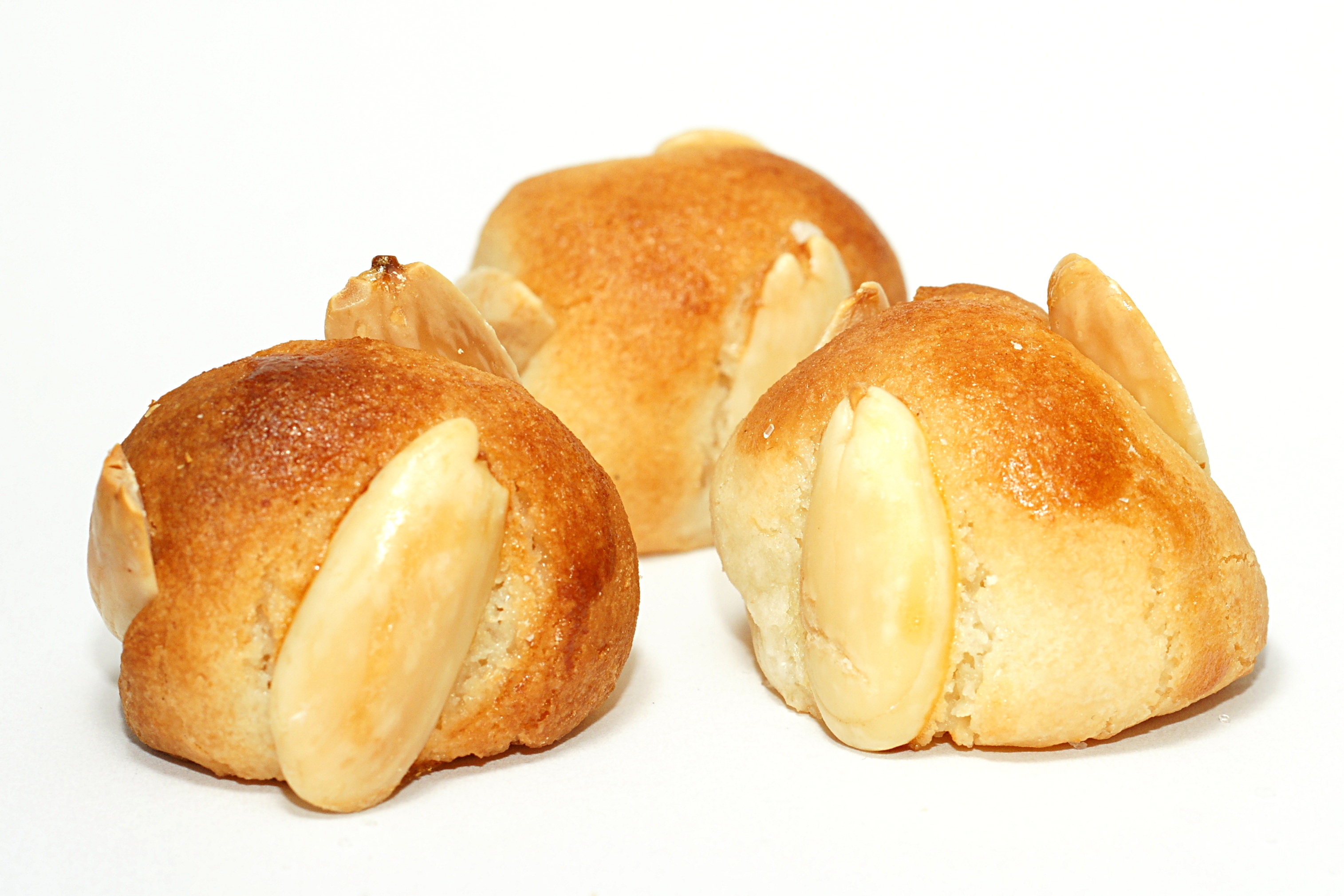
Bethmännchen

- Bethmännchen – German pastry
- Bienenstich – German layered yeast cake
- Biscuit Tortoni – Italian frozen dairy dessert
- Blancmange – Dessert of milk or cream and sugar, thickened and flavoured
- Calissons – Traditional candy from Aix-en-Provence
- Christmas cake – Baked sweet food served during Christmas
- Churchkhela – Georgian candle-shaped nut candy
- Ciarduna – Type of Italian pastry
- Colomba di Pasqua – Italian traditional Easter cake
- Comfit – Confectionary
- Coucougnette – Confection made with almonds, marzipan, and chocolate
- Crème de Noyaux – Almond-flavored crème liqueur

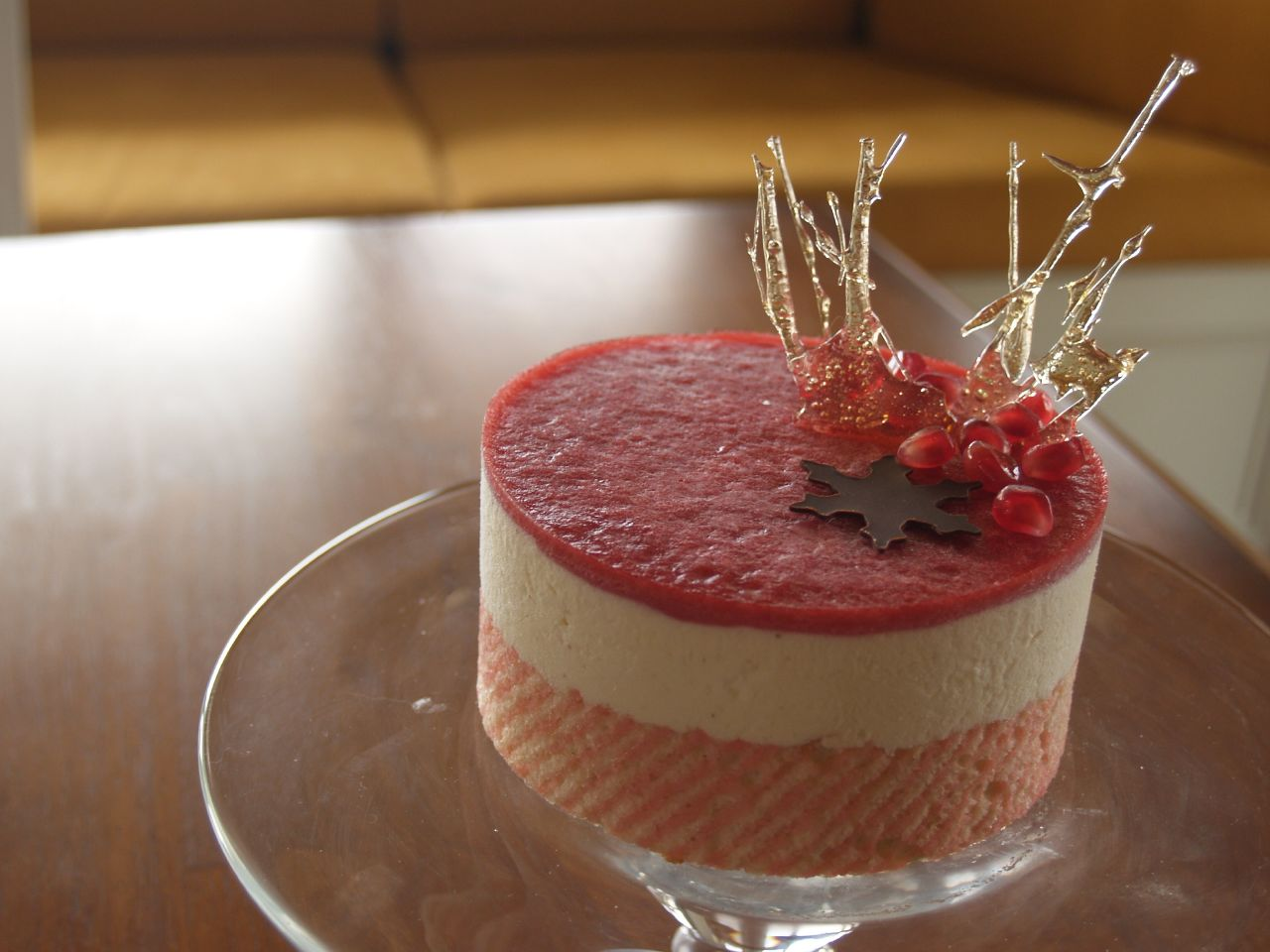
Eggnog mousse cake prepared with almond dacquoise

- Dacquoise – Layered dessert cake
- Dariole – French pastry and dessert mold
- Esterházy torte – Type of layer cake
- Financier (cake) – Small French almond cake

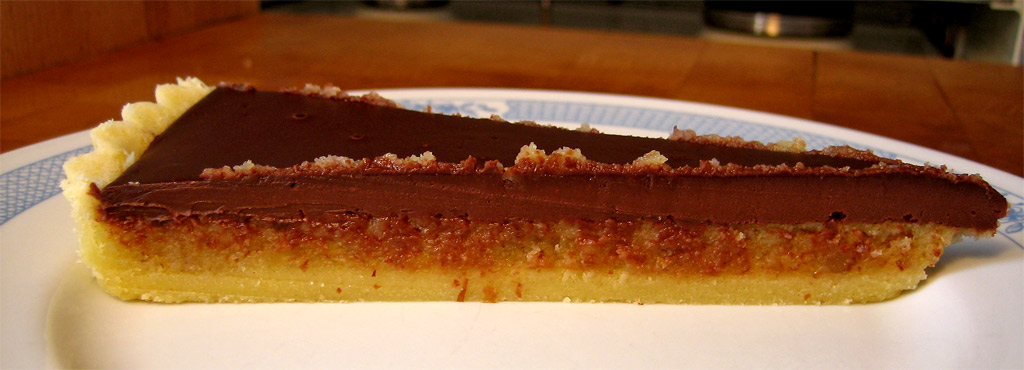
A chocolate tart with frangipane filling as the middle layer

- Frangipane – Almond custard
- Friand – Small almond cake
- Gâteau Basque – French pastry
- Gugelhupf – German yeast cake
- Galette de Rois – Type of cake associated with Epiphany—French puff pastry filled with frangipane
- Jésuite – French pastry
- Just Right – Breakfast cereal made by Kellogg's
- Kransekake – Traditional Danish and Norwegian confection
- Leipziger Lerche – Pastry of Leipzig

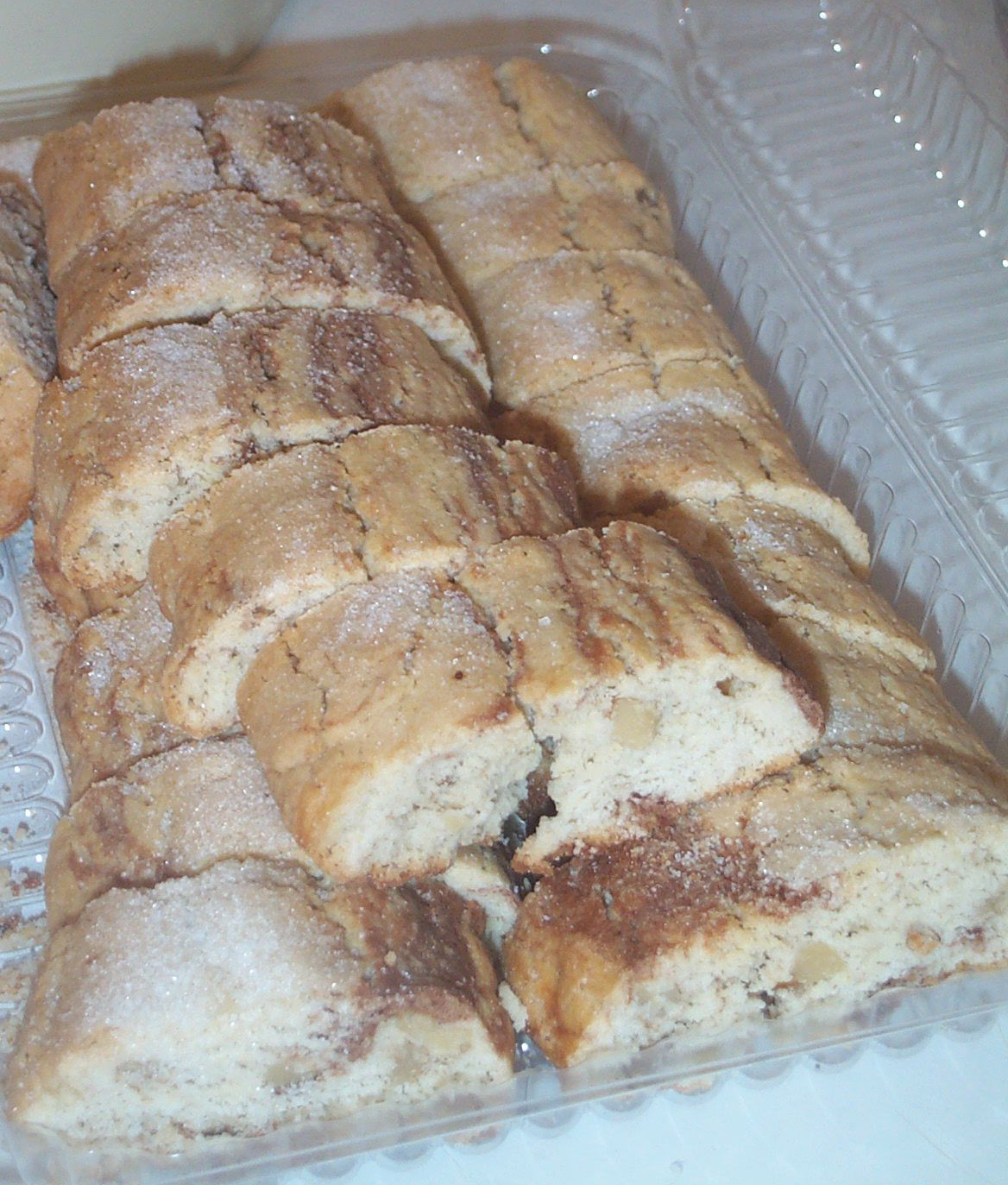
Mandelbrodt bread. The Yiddish word mandelbrodt literally means almond bread, a reference to its common ingredient of almonds.

- Mandelbrodt – Jewish almond cookie
- Marjolaine – Layered dessert cake
- Marzipan – Confection of sugar and almond flour
  - Königsberg marzipan – Type of marzipan from Kaliningrad
  - Lübeck Marzipan – German marzipan brand
  - Marzipan pig – Marzipan candy in the shape of a pig
- Mazariner – Swedish almond tart
- Mohr im Hemd – Austrian dessert
- Muskazine – German biscuit
- Noghl – Sugar-coated almonds
- Norman Tart – French almond dessert
- Orgeat – Sweet syrup
- Peladillas – Spanish desert from Casinos, Valencia.
- Princess cake – Traditional Swedish layer cake
- Romesco – Catalan sauce of tomatoes, garlic, and nuts—Spanish condiment
- Semmelwrap – Swedish almond pastry
- Sher Berinj – Rice pudding
- Simnel cake – Layered fruit cake associated with Easter
- Tabrizi Lovuez – Diamond-shape almond dish
- Tarta de Santiago – Traditional dessert from Galicia
- Tarte conversation – French pastry
- Tecula mecula
- Torta caprese – Italian chocolate cake
- Turrón – Southern European nougat confection
- Xató – Sauce in Catalan cooking
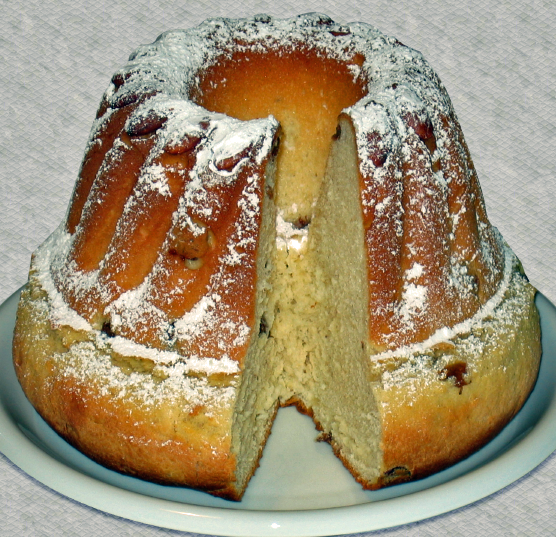
Gugelhupf consists of a soft yeast dough which contains raisins, almonds and Kirschwasser cherry brandy. Some also contain candied fruits and nuts.

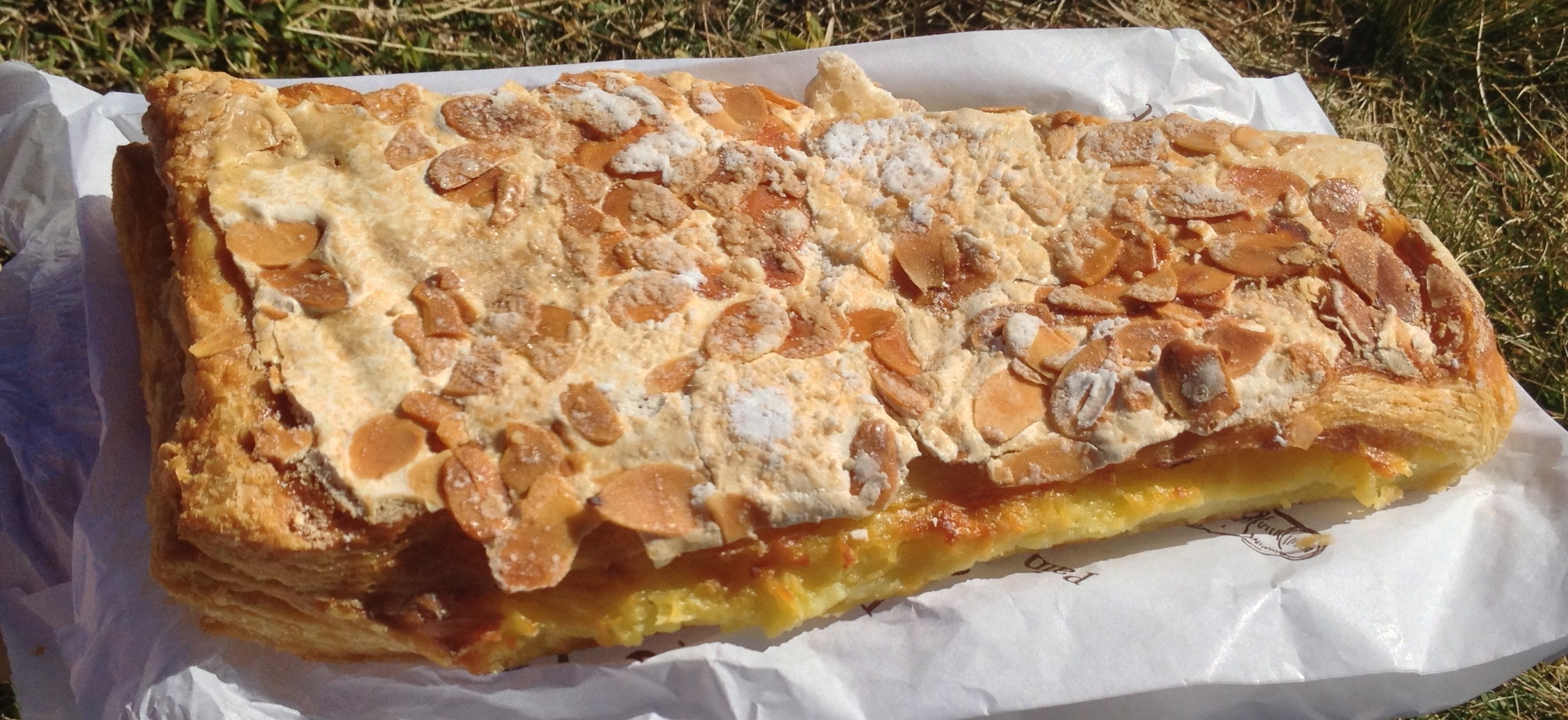
A Jésuite is a triangular, flake pastry filled with frangipane cream and topped with sliced almonds and powdered sugar.

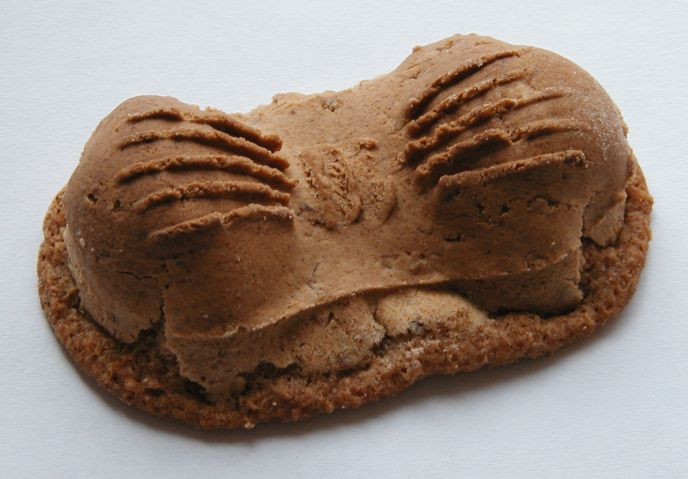
Muskazine

=== Almond cookies ===
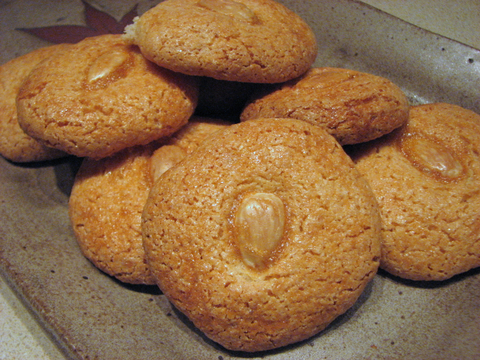
Acıbadem kurabiyesi is an almond cookie in Turkish cuisine.

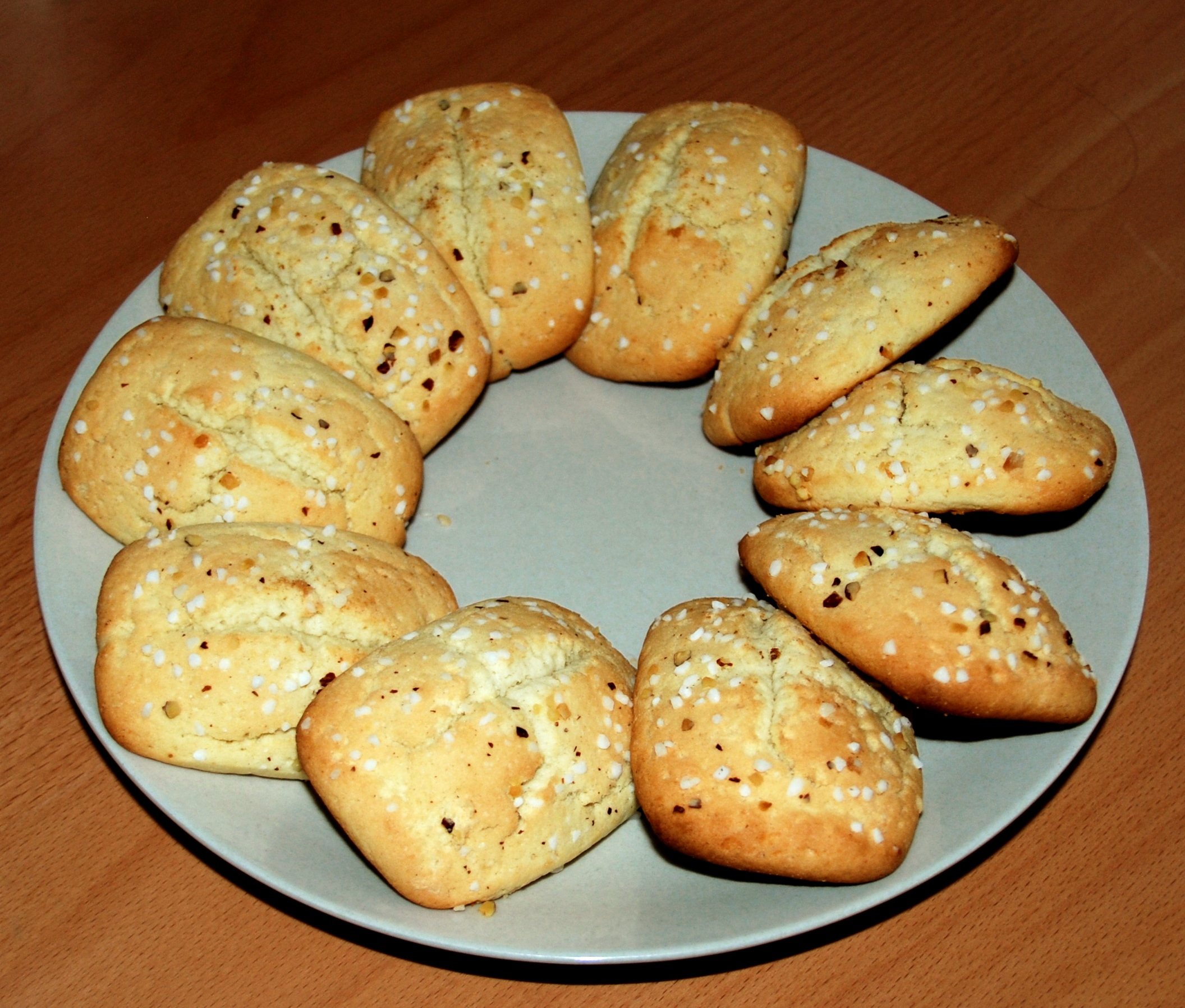
Mandelkubb is a Swedish pastry with almond as the main ingredient.

- Acıbadem kurabiyesi – Food made with flour and almonds
- Almond biscuit – also referred to as almond cookie
- Amaretti di Saronno – Italian biscuit
- Banket – Type of pastry
- Biscotti – Italian twice-baked almond biscuits
- Bruttiboni – Biscuit of Italian origin
- Ghoriba – Shortbread-like cookies
- Macaron – Sweet meringue-based confectionery
- Macaroon – Type of cookie
- Mandelkubb – Traditional Danish and Swedish cookie
- Pignolo – Italian cookies covered in pine nuts
- Qurabiya – Shortbread-like cookies
- Ricciarelli – Italian almond biscuits
- Speculoos – Type of biscuit
- Tortas de aceite – Type of biscuit
- Tuile – French wafer
- Vanillekipferl – Crescent shaped cookies

=== Beverages ===
- Almond milk – a plant milk with a watery texture and nutty flavor manufactured from almonds
- Amaretto – an Italian liqueur associated with the city of Saronno
- Amarguinha – a bitter, almond-flavored Portuguese liqueur
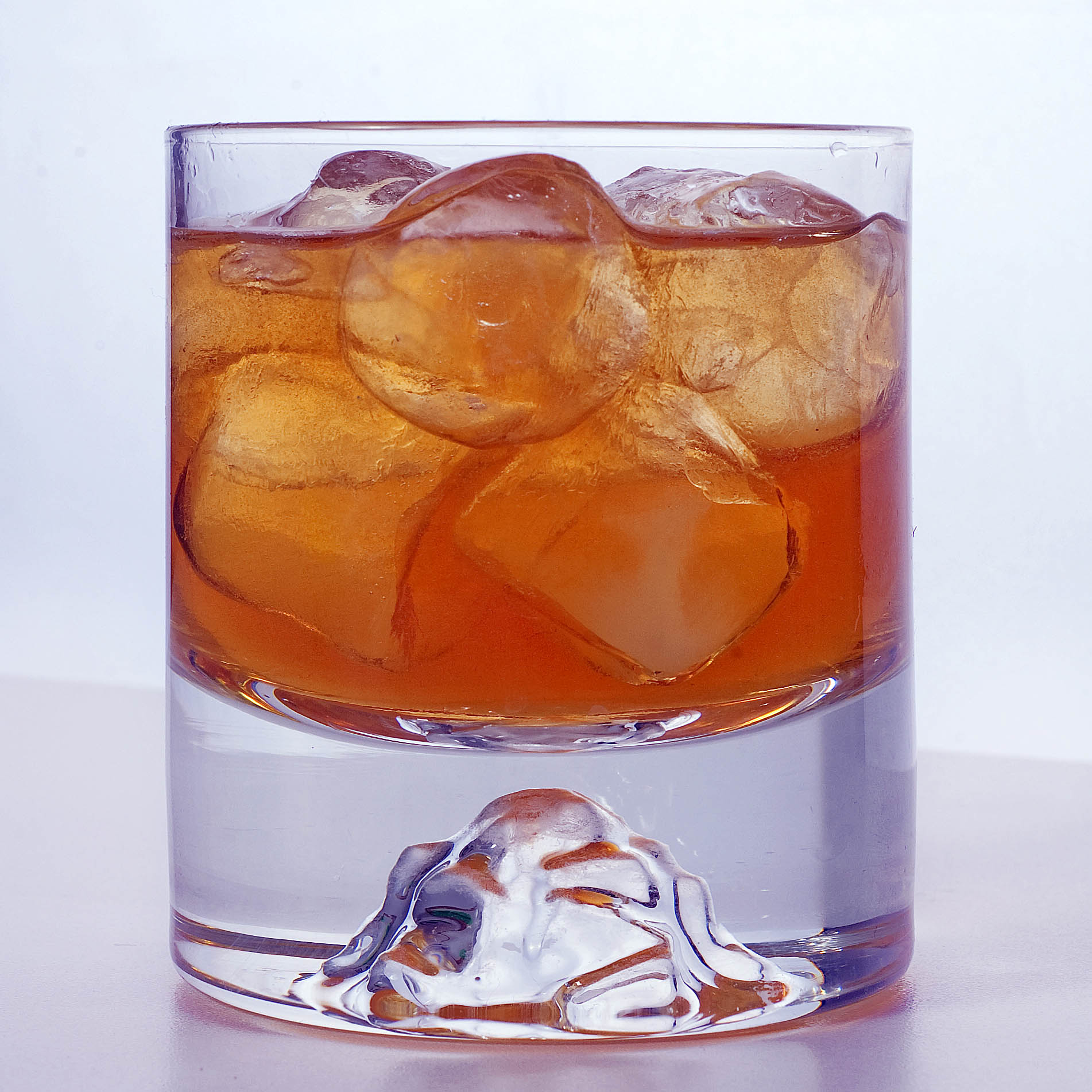
The Godfather cocktail is prepared using equal parts scotch whisky and amaretto. Amaretto is a sweet, almond-flavored, Italian liqueur.

=== Confectionery ===
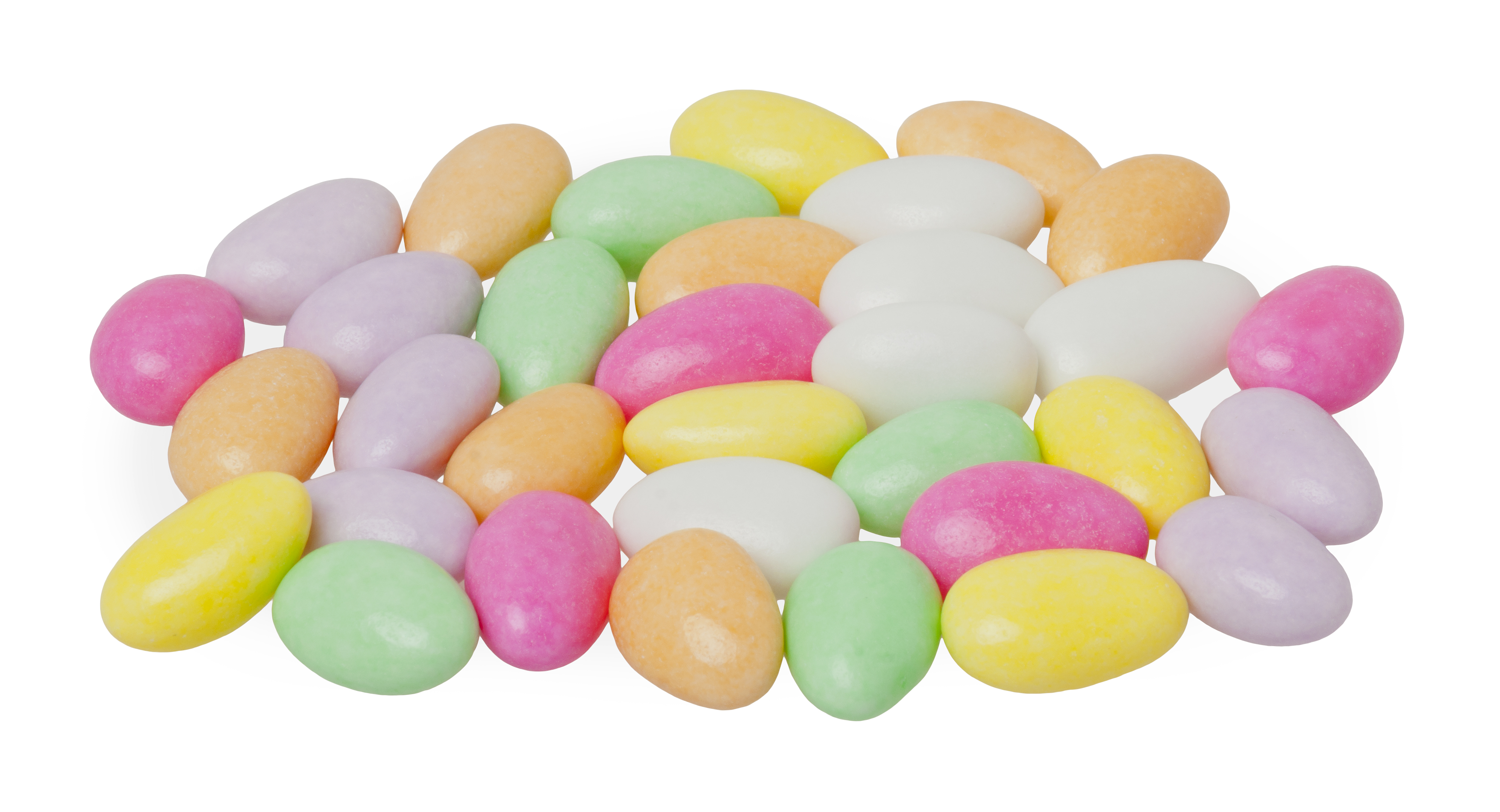
Jordan almonds

- Aboukir almonds
- Almond bark – Almond confection
- Almond Joy – Candy bar
- Almond Roca – Chocolate-almond-toffee candy
- Bit-O-Honey – American candy product
- Candied almonds – Sweet almond snack food
- Daim bar – Brand of candy bar
- Jordan almonds – Confectionery
- Troika (chocolate) – Candy subsidiary of the Orkla Group
- Tupla (chocolate bar) – Finnish chocolate bar brand

== See also ==
- Almond butter
- Almond meal
- Almond paste
- List of edible seeds
- Lists of prepared foods
