= Gehlhaar =

Gehlhaar may refer to:

- Rolf Gehlhaar (1943–2019), composer and professor of experimental music
- Gehlhaar, a manufacturer of Königsberg marzipan
