= Brutti ma buoni =

Biscuit of Italian origin

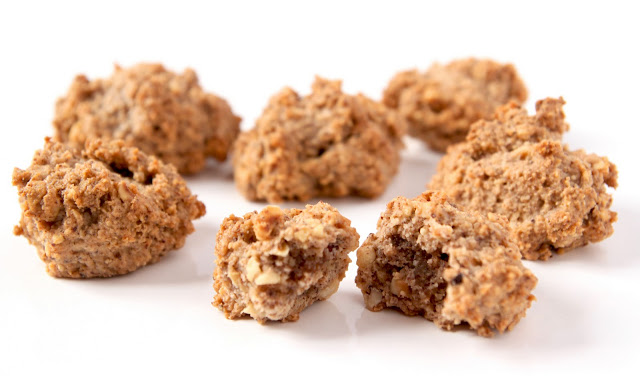
- Alternative names: Mandorlati di San Clemente
- Type: Biscuit
- Place of origin: Italy
- Main ingredients: Hazelnuts and/or almonds, meringue

Brutti ma buoni (lit. 'ugly but good'), also known as mandorlati di San Clemente, is a type of hazelnut or almond-flavoured biscuit produced in Prato, Tuscany, and many other cities. These biscuits are made by incorporating meringue, which is an egg white and sugar mixture, with roasted chopped nuts. Brutti ma buoni are crunchy on the outside with a soft texture in the middle. Their origin is disputed, but they have been made since at least the mid-1800s.

In Prato, they are often sold with biscottini di Prato.

== See also ==
- List of Italian desserts and pastries
- List of almond dishes
