= Mandelkubb =

Traditional Swedish cookie

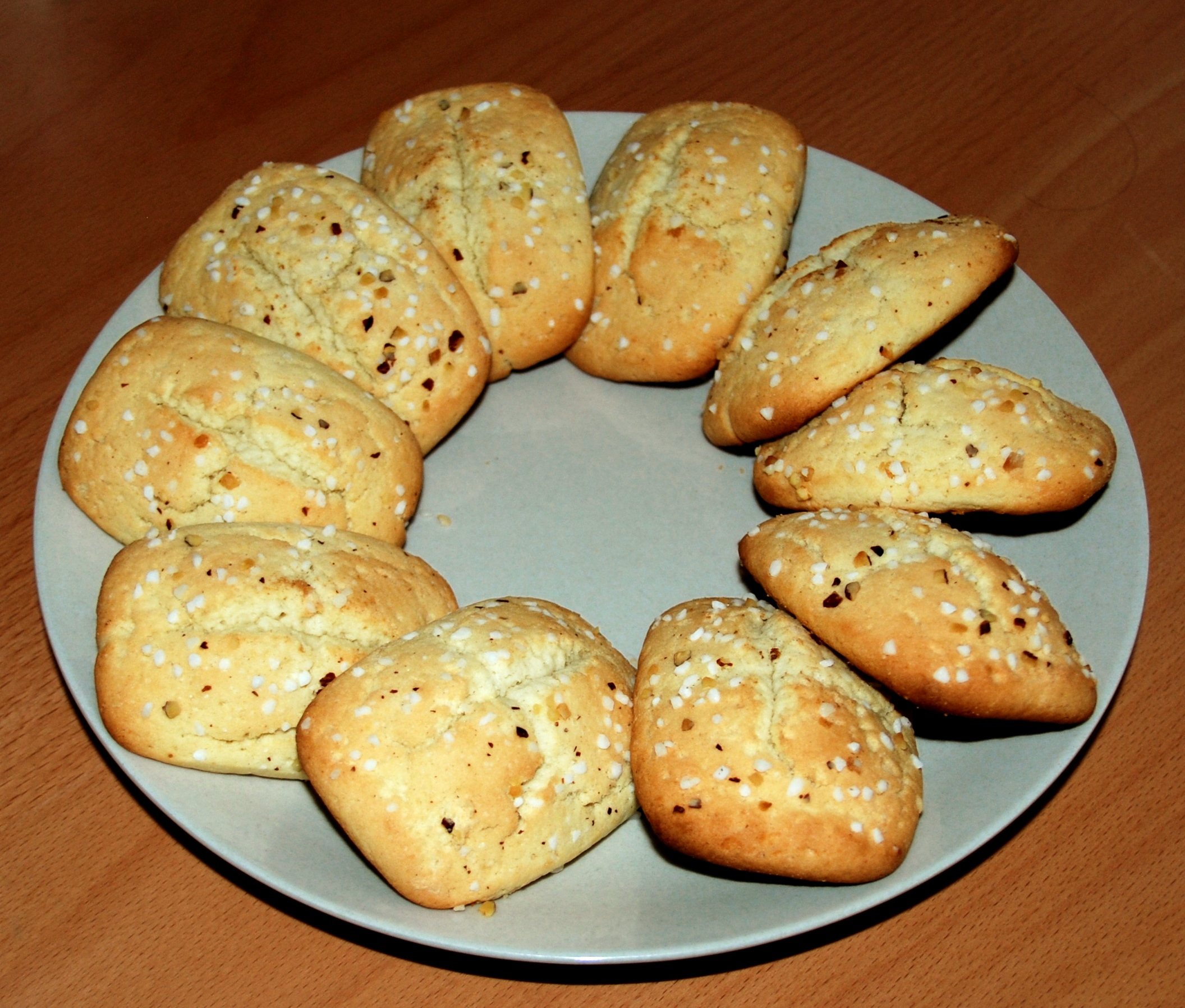
- Course: Dessert
- Place of origin: Sweden
- Main ingredients: Bitter almond, flour, sugar, eggs, ammonium carbonate

Mandelkubb is a traditional Swedish bitter almond cookie characterized by a bittersweet flavor. Its distinct flavor is derived from bitter almonds. The pastry is made with flour, sugar, eggs, butter, bitter almonds, ammonium carbonate, and leavening agents. They are often garnished with nib sugar.

== See also ==
- List of almond dishes
