= Shir Berenj =

Rice pudding

- Type: Rice pudding
- Place of origin: Iran
- Serving temperature: Warm or chilled
- Main ingredients: Rice, milk, sugar, rose water, almonds

Shir Berenj (Dari: شیربرنج) is an Iranian rice pudding flavored with rose water, spices such as cinnamon or cardamom, and often containing almonds. It may be served warm or chilled as a dessert.

== See also ==
- List of almond dishes
- Sholezard, with saffron
