= Leipziger Lerche =

Pastry of Leipzig

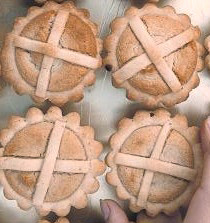
- Type: Pastry
- Place of origin: Germany
- Region or state: Leipzig
- Main ingredients: Shortcrust, almonds, nuts, one cherry

The Leipziger Lerche is a pastry of Leipzig. The name originates from a delicacy popular in the Leipzig area until the 1870s. The dish used the songbird lark (German: Lerche), which was roasted with herbs and eggs and served as a filling in a pastry crust. In the year 1720, 400,000 larks were sold in Leipzig.

The hunting of the songbirds was officially banned by the saxonian King Albert I in 1876 after recognition of their agricultural importance. According to the Vienna Appetit-Lexikon, larks were still exported from Leipzig until the end of the 19th century. Today's pastry replaced the traditional meat-filled pastry after the ban. The local pastry chefs are credited for helping to preserve the larks by creating the new, sweet version of Leipziger Lerche shortly after the hunting ban was imposed.

Today's version consists of a shortcrust filled with a mixture of crushed almonds, nuts and a cherry. The cherry symbolises the heart of the bird. It is topped with a grid of two crossed dough strips. The term Leipziger Lerche has been protected by the Saxonian Bakery Guild since 1998.

== See also ==
- List of almond dishes
