= Coucougnette =

Confection made with almonds, marzipan, and chocolate

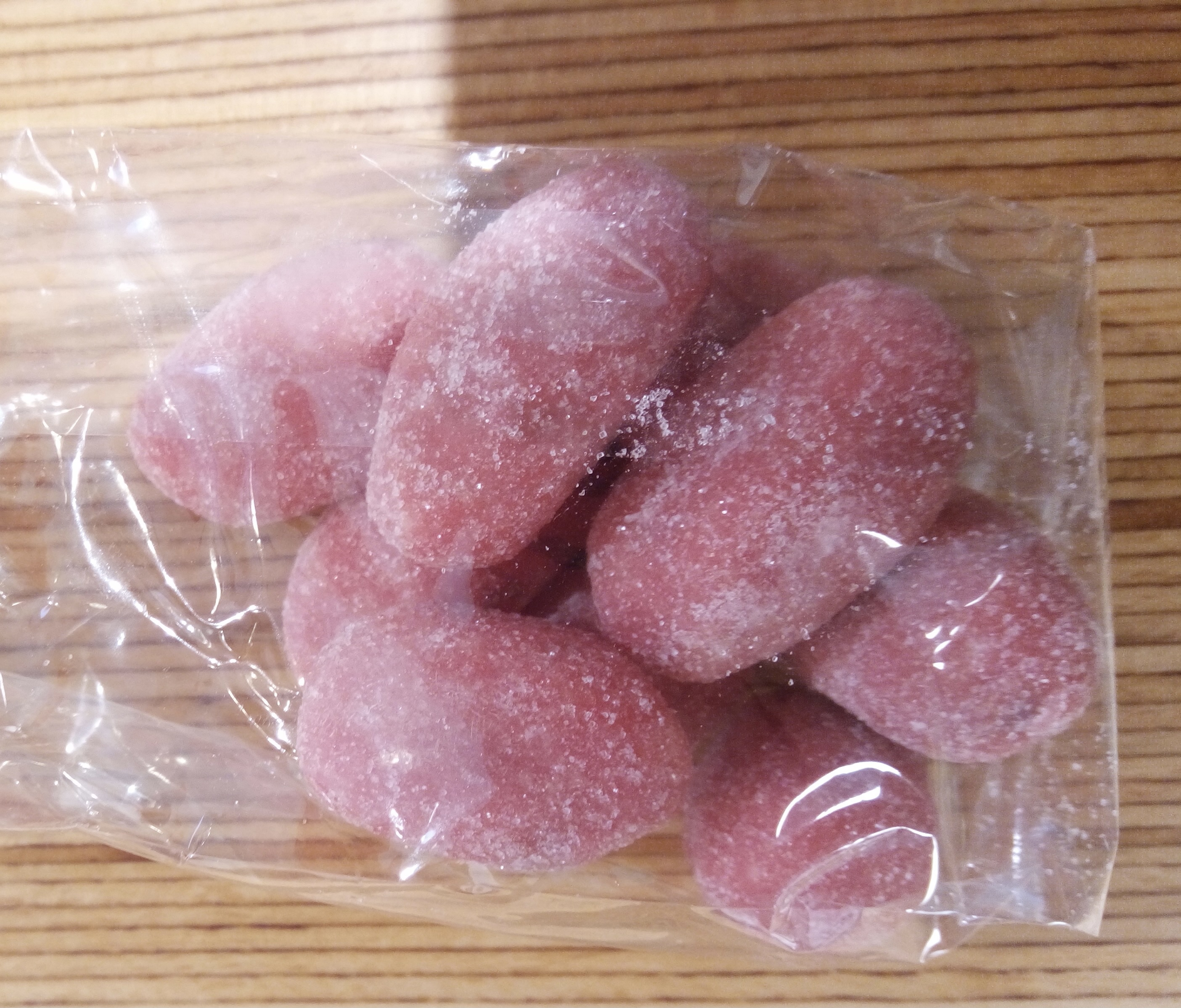
A bag of coucougnettes

A coucougnette is a confection made with almonds, marzipan, and chocolate. The sweet consists of a whole roasted almond coated in dark chocolate and rolled in a mixture of crushed almonds, cane sugar, ginger brandy, and Armagnac. Each coucougnette is dipped in raspberry juice, giving it a pink color.

Coucougnettes received the award for Best French Bonbon at the Paris "Intersuc" Salon in 2000.

== See also ==
- List of almond dishes
