= Ciarduna =

Type of Italian pastry

- Type: Pastry
- Place of origin: Italy
- Region or state: Sicily
- Main ingredients: Almonds, ricotta or mascarpone

Ciarduna is a type of Italian baked goods.

Ciarduna siciliana is a sweet baked goods from the province of Agrigento, in Sicily. It consists of an almond cookie shell filled with a ricotta filling.

== Traditional ingredients ==
Traditional ingredients are flour, sugar, strutto, vanilla, active yeast, ammonia baking powder (ammonium bicarbonate), homogenized milk, crushed almonds, cinnamon, and icing sugar (when decorating the tops of the ciarduna's).

== See also ==
- Cannoli
- List of Italian desserts and pastries
- List of almond dishes
