= Argan oil =

Plant oil

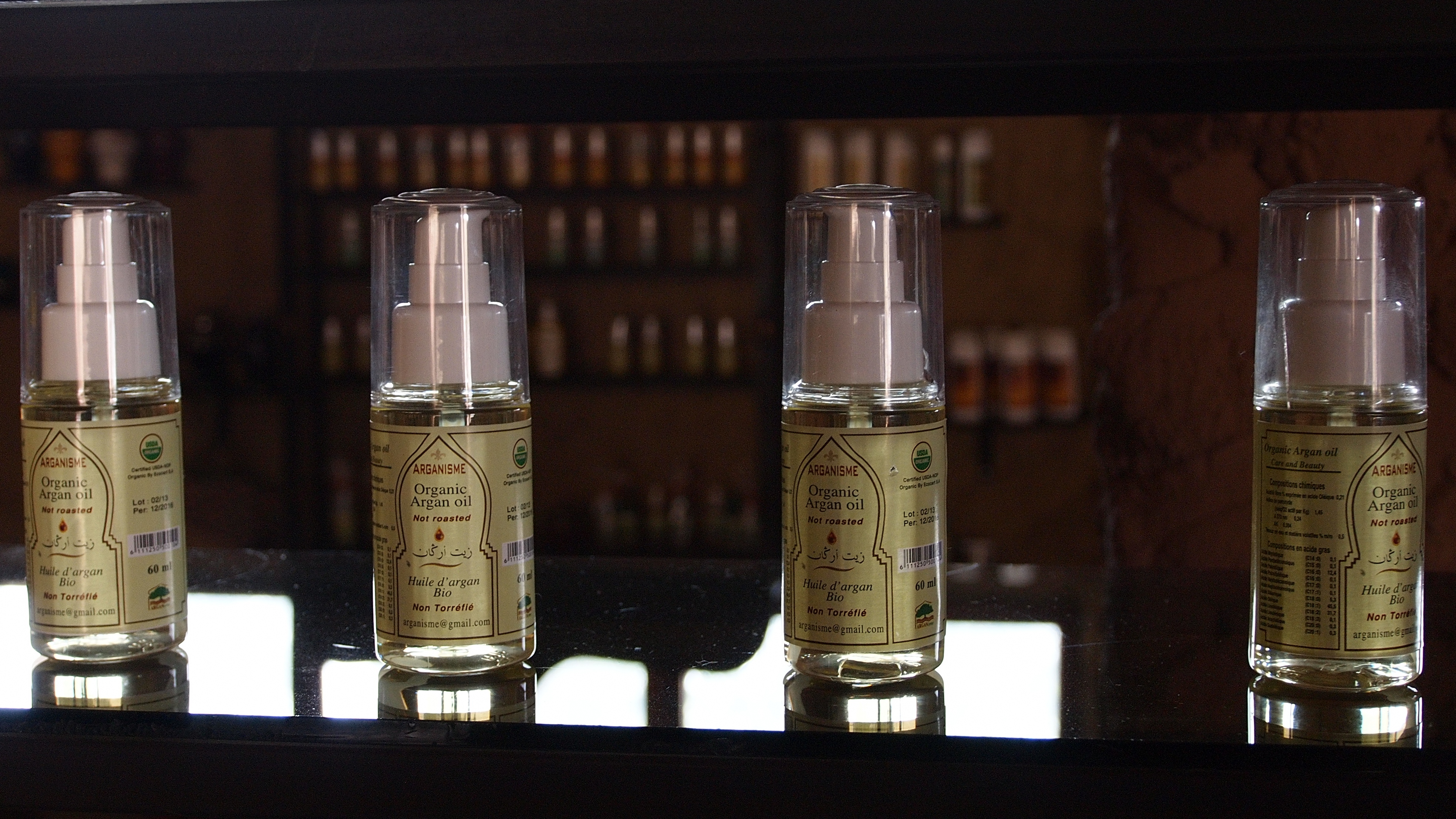
- Containers of argan oil
- Type: Plant oil
- Place of origin: Maghreb
- Main ingredients: Fruit of the argan tree

Argan, practices and know-how concerning the argan tree
- UNESCO Intangible Cultural Heritage
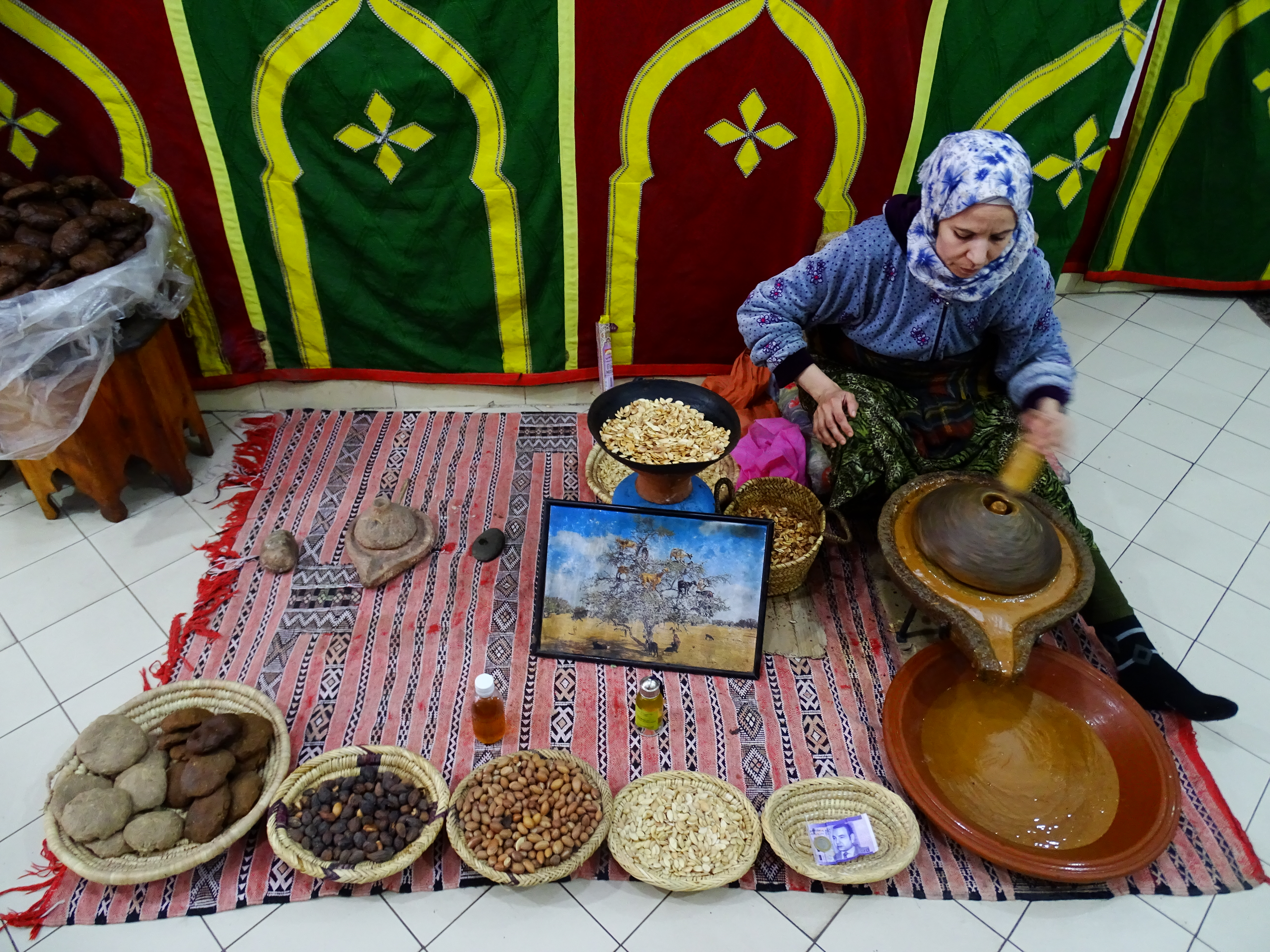
- Argan paste making
- Country: Morocco
- Reference: 955

Inscription history
- Inscription: 2014 (14nd session)
- List: Representative

Argan oil is a plant oil produced from the kernels of the argan tree (Argania spinosa L.), which is indigenous to Morocco and southwestern Algeria. In Morocco, argan oil is used to dip bread at breakfast or to drizzle on couscous or pasta. It is also used for cosmetic purposes.

== Properties ==
Ninety-nine percent of argan oil consists of triglycerides and related derivatives. These are derived from the following fatty acids:

Fatty acid	Percentage
Oleic	42.8%
Linoleic	36.8%
Palmitic	12.0%
Stearic	6.0%
Linolenic	<0.5%

Argan oil has a relative density at 20 °C (68 °F) ranging from 0.906 to 0.919.

Argan oil also contains traces of tocopherols (vitamin E), phenols, carotenes, squalene. Some trace phenols in argan oil include caffeic acid, oleuropein, vanillic acid, tyrosol, catechol, resorcinol, (−)-epicatechin and (+)-catechin.

Depending on the extraction method, argan oil may be more resistant to oxidation than olive oil.

== Uses ==
=== Culinary ===
In Morocco, the oil is used for culinary purposes, e.g. dipping bread, as salad dressing or on couscous. Amlu, a thick brown paste with a consistency similar to peanut butter, is used locally as a bread dip. It is produced by grinding roasted almonds and argan oil together using stones, and then mixing the paste with honey.

=== Cosmetics ===
Since the early 2000s argan oil has been increasingly used in cosmetics and hair care preparations. As of 2020, the main cosmetics products containing argan oil are face creams, lip glosses, shampoos, moisturizers, and soaps.

== Extraction ==
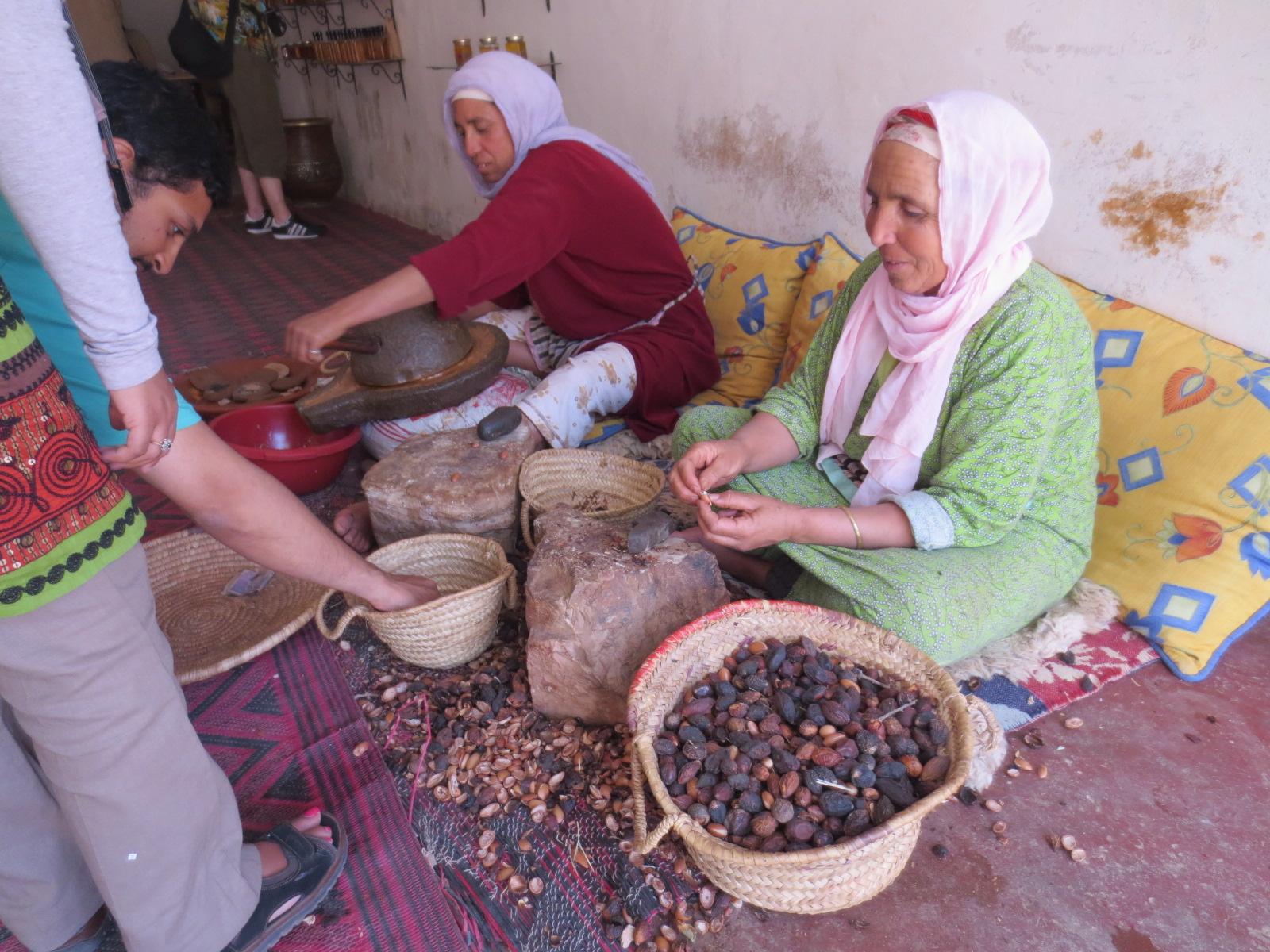
The production of argan oil by traditional methods

The argan nut contains one to three oil-rich argan kernels. Extraction yields from 30% to 50% of the oil in the kernels, depending on the method. It takes about 40 kilograms (88 lb) of dried argan fruit to produce only one litre of oil.

Extraction is key to the production process. To extract the kernels, workers first dry argan fruit in the open air and then remove the fleshy pulp. Some producers remove the flesh mechanically without drying the fruit. Moroccans usually use the flesh as animal feed. A tradition in some areas of Morocco allows goats to climb argan trees to feed freely on the fruits. The kernels are then later retrieved from the goat droppings, considerably reducing the labour involved in extraction at the expense of some potential gustatory aversion. In modern practice, the peels are removed by hand.

Workers gently roast kernels they will use to make culinary argan oil. After the argan kernels cool, workers grind and press them. The brown-coloured mash expels pure, unfiltered argan oil. Finally, they decant unfiltered argan oil into vessels. The remaining press cake is protein-rich and frequently used as cattle feed.

== Production ==
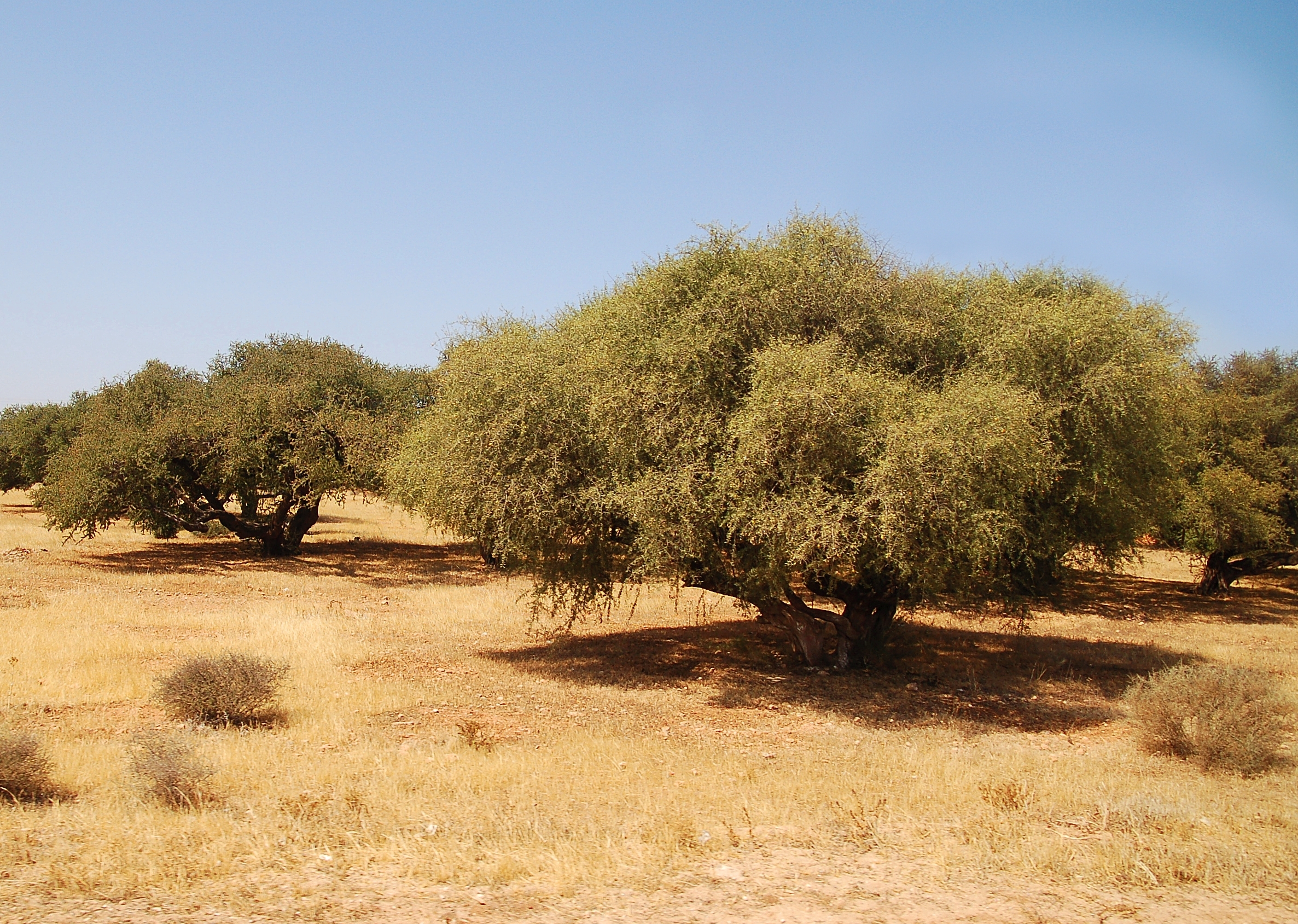
Plantation of argans

After the first sales in the US of the cosmetic product in 2003, demand soared and production increased. In 2012 the Moroccan government planned for increased production, then around 2,500 tonnes, to 4,000 tonnes by 2020.

It was found that stocks of argan oil were being diluted with oils such as sunflower, as the extraction process for pure argan oil can be difficult, and is costly. In 2012, the Moroccan government started to randomly pull argan shipments and test for purity before exporting.

By 2020, production had greatly increased, especially after studies had suggested health benefits. Almost all of the oil is sourced in Morocco, and is forecast to reach 19,623 US tons (17,802 tonnes) in 2022, up from 4,836 (4387 tonnes) in 2014; in value terms, US$1.79 billion (£1.4 billion).

The area of producing the oil is expanding: in 2020 it had started near the city of Agadir, 175 kilometres (109 mi) south of the traditional argan-producing area of Essaouira, and is due to expand north.

40 kilograms (88 lb) of dried argan fruit produces only one litre of oil. Mechanically extracted oil production has started, with the industrial scale driving down prices, impacting the small co-operatives, where work is mostly done by Berber women in the traditional, labour-intensive way. Mechanically produced oil can cost as little as US$22 a litre, less than half the cost of oil made by the cooperatives. This can have a great social impact. However, the huge cosmetics company L'Oréal has pledged to source all of its argan oil from the small co-operatives that sign up to the principles of fair trade.

== Effects ==
=== Environmental ===
The argan tree provides food, shelter and protection from desertification. The trees' deep roots help prevent desert encroachment. The canopy of argan trees also provides shade for other agricultural products, and the leaves and fruit provide feed for animals.

The argan tree also helps landscape stability, helping to prevent soil erosion, providing shade for pasture grasses, and helping to replenish aquifers.

Producing argan oil has helped to protect argan trees from being cut down. In addition, regeneration of the Arganeraie has also been carried out: in 2009 an operation to plant 4,300 argan plants was launched in Meskala in the province of Essaouira.

The Réseau des Associations de la Réserve de Biosphère Arganeraie (Network of Associations of the Argan Biosphere Reserve, RARBA) was founded in 2002 with the aim of ensuring sustainable development in the Arganeraie.

RARBA has been involved with several major projects, including the Moroccan national anti-desertification programme (Programme National de Lutte contre la desertification, PAN/LCD). The project involved local populations and helped with improvements to basic infrastructure, management of natural resources, revenue-generating activities (including argan oil production), capacity reinforcement, and others.

=== Social ===
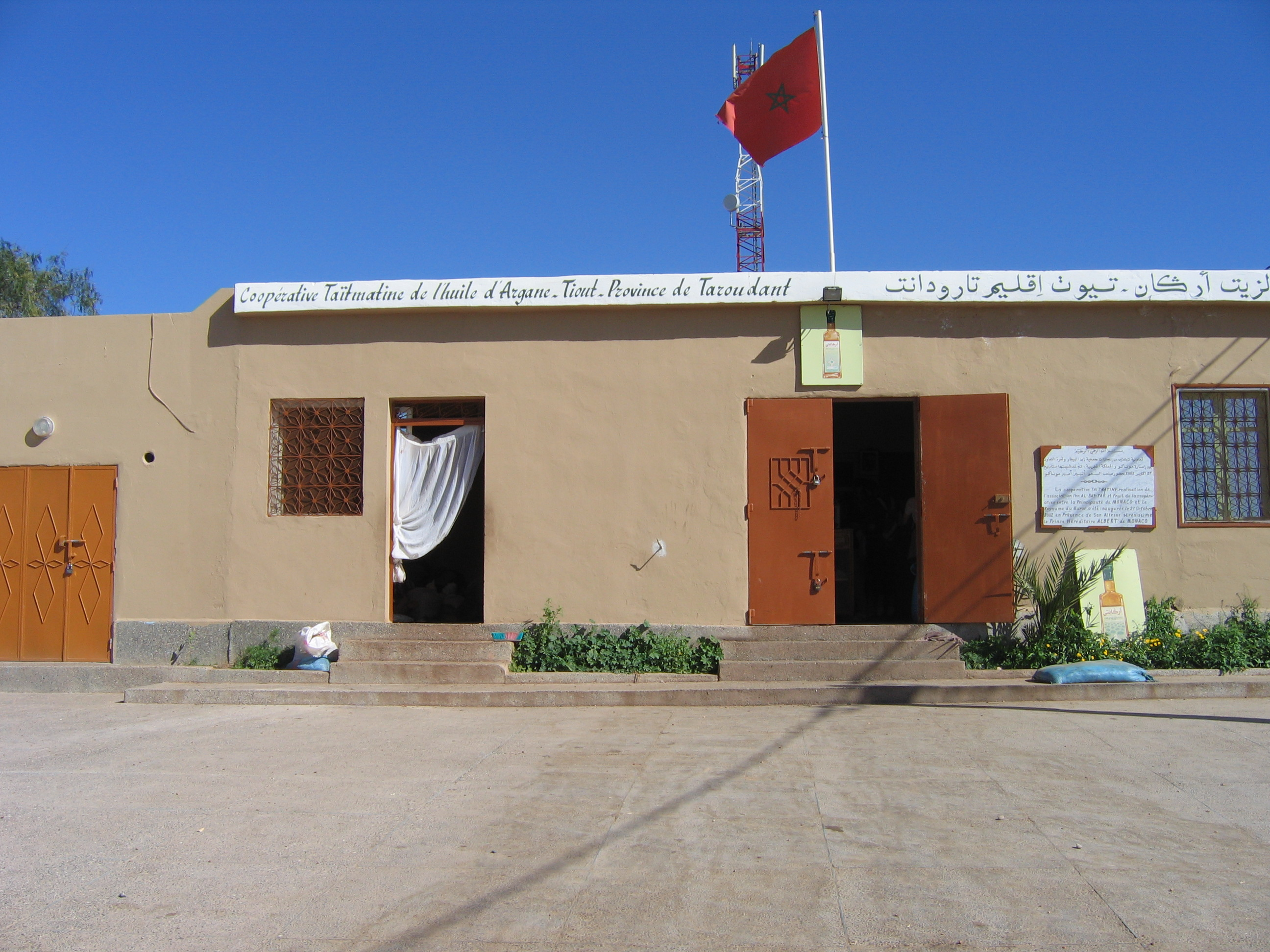
Argan cooperative in Taroudant Province

The production of argan oil has always had a socioeconomic function. At present, its production supports about 2.2 million people in the main argan oil–producing region, the Arganeraie.

Much of the argan oil produced today is made by a number of women's co-operatives. Co-sponsored by the Social Development Agency with the support of the European Union, the UCFA (Union des Cooperatives des Femmes de l’Arganeraie) is the largest union of argan oil co-operatives in Morocco. It comprises 22 cooperatives that are found in other parts of the region.

As of 2020, there were around 300 small firms, mostly co-operatives, in the area about 25 kilometres (16 mi) inland from Essaouira, on the Atlantic coast. The women who harvest the seeds are mostly of the Berber ethnic group, with traditional skills dating from generations ago.

The success of the argan co-operatives has also encouraged other producers of agricultural products to adopt the co-operative model. The establishment of the co-operatives has been aided by support from within Morocco, notably the Foundation Mohamed VI pour la Recherche et la Sauvegarde de l’Arganier (Mohammed VI Foundation for Research and Protection of the Argan Tree), and from international organisations, including Canada's International Development Research Centre and the European Commission.

However, despite many working a very long day, the women usually make less than US$221 (£170 stg) a month (and even as low as US$50), which is below Morocco's recommended national minimum wage. Zoubida Charrouf, a chemistry professor at Mohammed V University of Rabat is an advocate for higher salaries, as well as the author of studies into its health benefits. She says that some companies pay drivers to bring tourists to their facilities, to sell them the oil, rather than pay their workers properly. Morocco's minister of agriculture has asked for Charrouf's help in forcing firms to join trade bodies and commit to paying staff the minimum wage.
