= Tecula mecula =

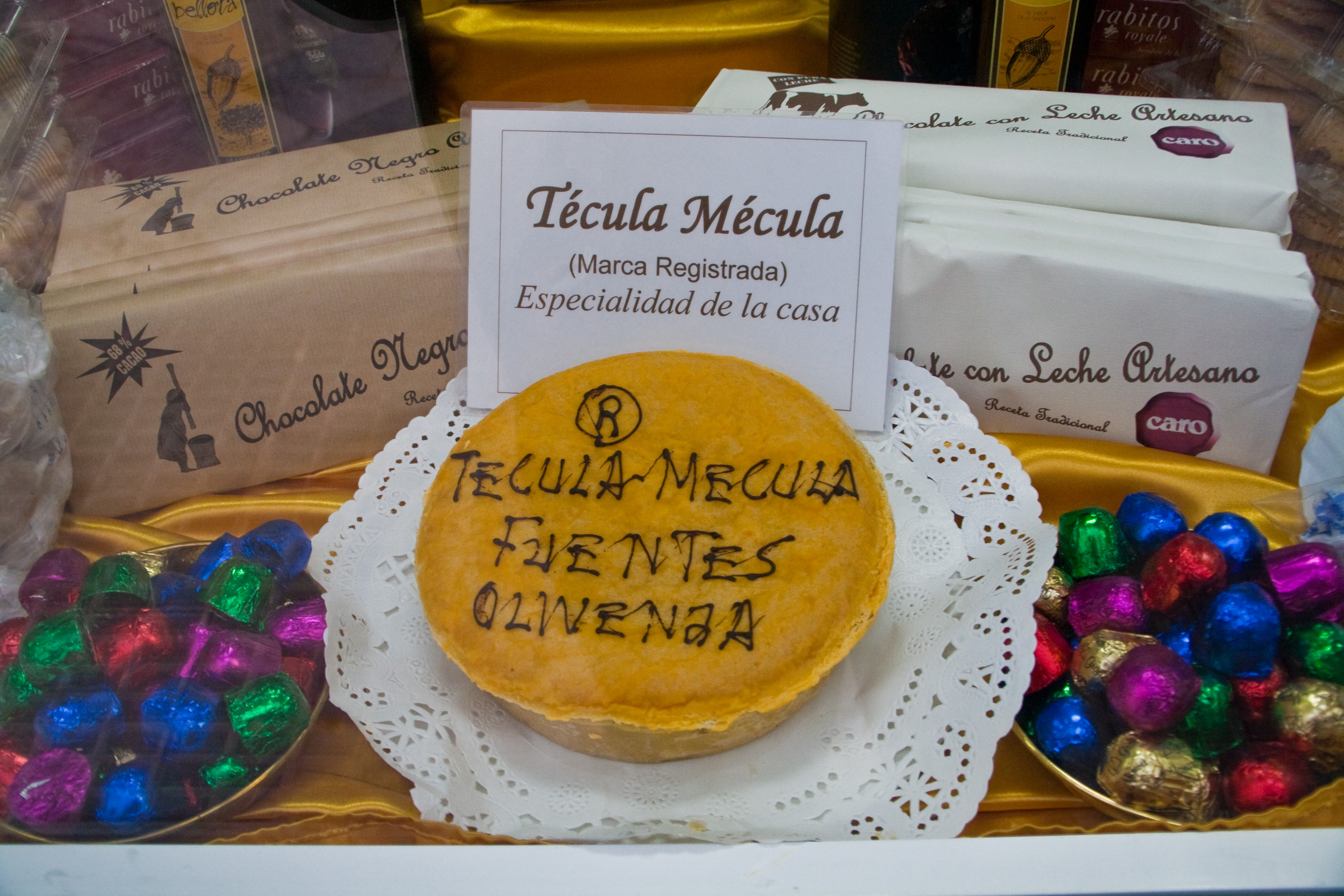
- Type: Dessert
- Place of origin: Spain
- Region or state: Extremadura
- Main ingredients: Almonds, egg yolks, sugar

Tecula mecula (Spanish: Técula mécula) is a traditional dessert from Extremadura, a region of western Spain. It is made from almonds, egg yolks, sugar and sometimes acorns.

== See also ==
- List of almond dishes
- List of desserts
