= Dacquoise =

Layered dessert cake

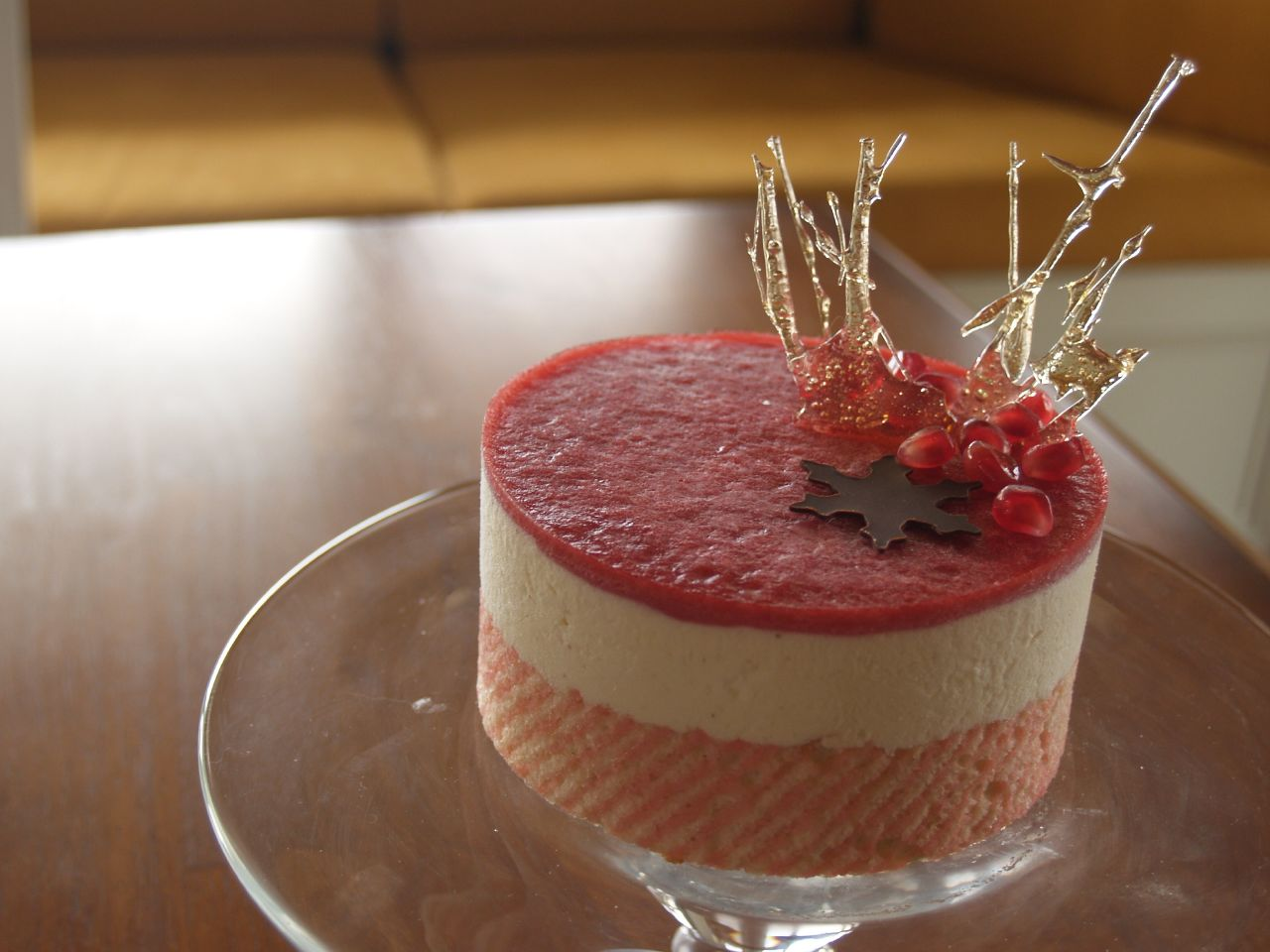
- Eggnog mousse cake with almond dacquoise
- Type: Cake
- Course: Dessert
- Place of origin: France
- Serving temperature: Chilled
- Main ingredients: Meringue (almonds and hazelnuts), whipped cream or buttercream, biscuit
- Variations: Marjolaine

A dacquoise (French: [dakwɑz]) is a dessert cake made with layers of almond and hazelnut meringue and whipped cream or buttercream. It is usually served chilled and accompanied by fruit.

The term dacquoise can also refer to the nut meringue layer itself.

== Etymology ==
It takes its name from the feminine form of the French word dacquois, meaning 'of Dax', a town in southwestern France.

== Variants ==
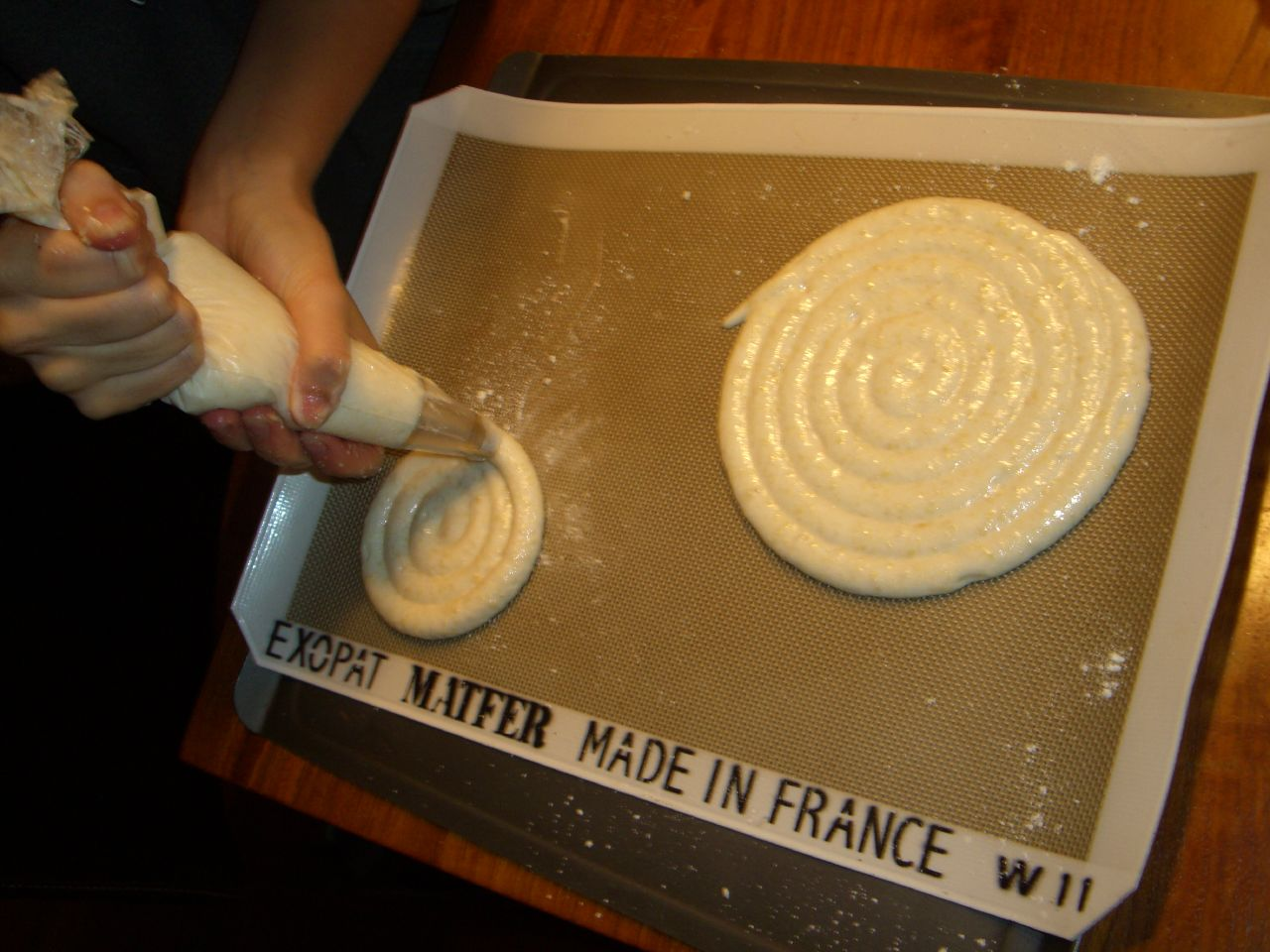
Piping dacquoise discs for mousse cake bases

A particular form of the dacquoise is the marjolaine, invented by French chef Fernand Point, which is long and rectangular and combines almond and hazelnut meringue layers with chocolate buttercream.

== See also ==
- Kyiv cake
- List of almond dishes
- Sans rival
