= Mandelbrot (cookie) =

Jewish almond cookie

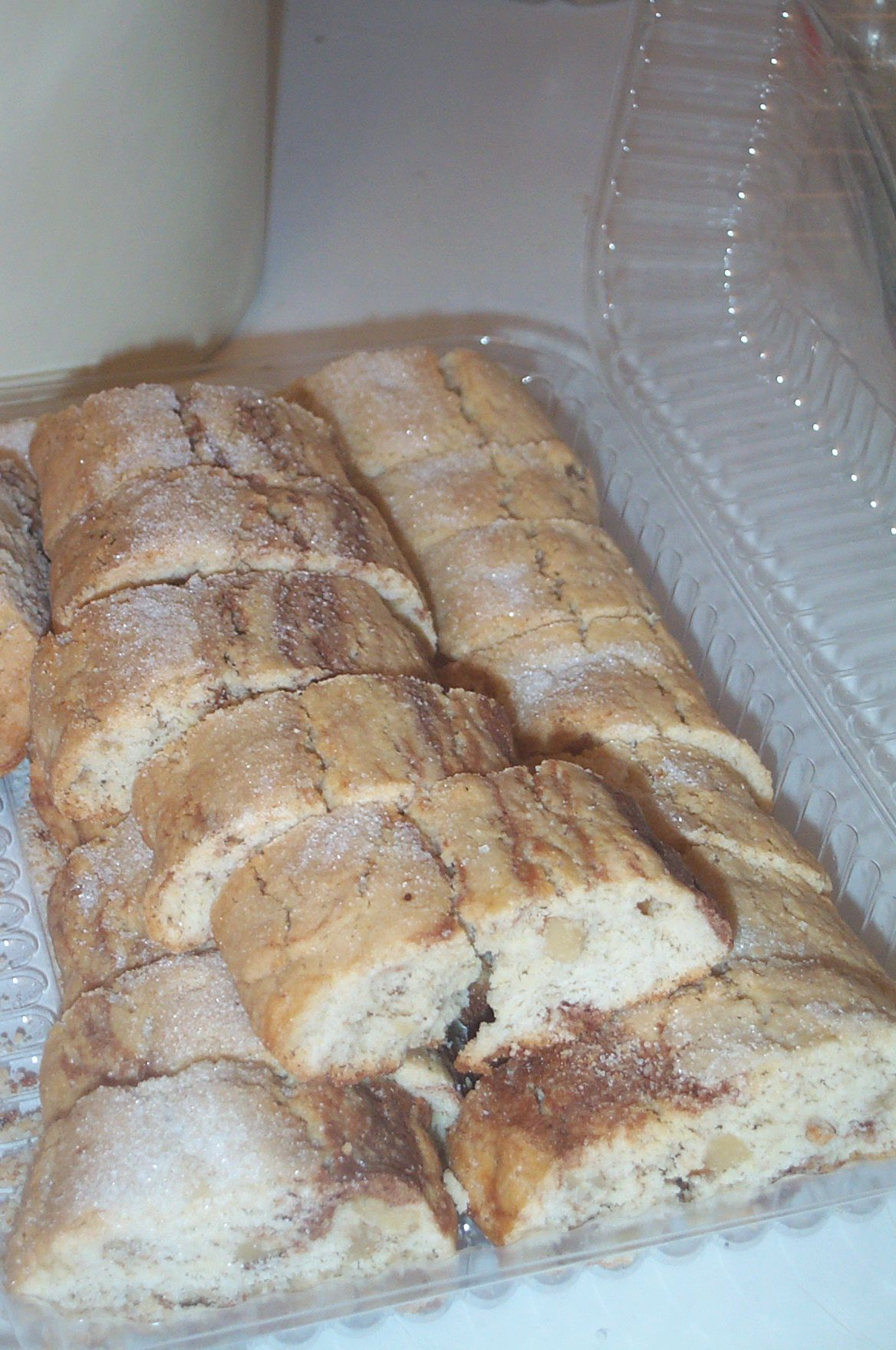
- A sliced loaf of Mandelbrot

Mandelbrot (Yiddish: מאַנדלברויט), with a number of variant spellings, (Note: With del or dl in the middle and t, dt, or d at the end: "mandelbrot", "mandelbrodt", "mandelbrod", "mandlbrot", "mandlbrodt"; also reflecting variant pronunciations, such as "mandelbroit") and called mandel bread or kamish in English-speaking countries and kamishbrot in Ukraine, is a type of cookie found in Ashkenazi Jewish cuisine and popular amongst Eastern European Jews. The Yiddish word mandlbroyt literally means almond bread, a reference to its common ingredient of almonds. It is typically formed by baking a loaf which is then cut into small slabs and twice-baked in order to form a crunchy exterior. The cookies were popular in Eastern Europe among rabbis, merchants and other itinerant Jews as a staple dessert that kept well.

Its precise origin is unknown, as is its historic relationship with biscotti, a similar Italian cookie. It is made with oil and not butter and so is pareve and can be served as part of the Shabbat dinner.

The basic ingredients are flour, sugar, eggs, and oil. Additional ingredients vary between bakers, but common additions include almonds, walnuts, cinnamon, chocolate chips or diced candied fruit. Mandelbrot is called kamishbrot in Ukraine, and the two terms are often used interchangeably in the United States.

== See also ==
- List of almond dishes
- List of cookies
