= Muskazine =

German biscuit

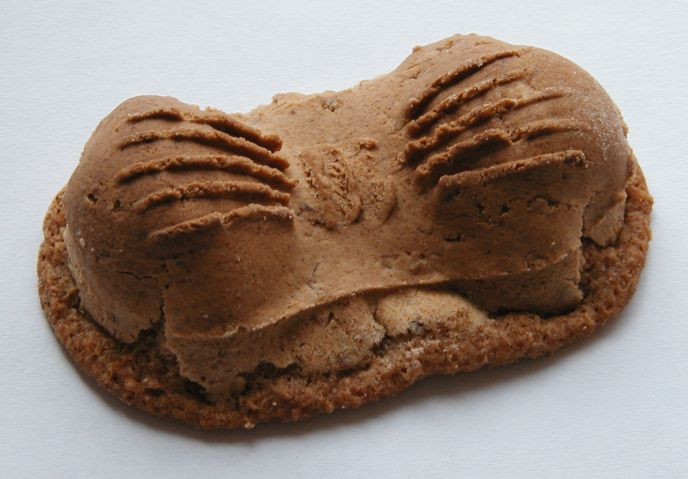
- Muskazine
- Type: Biscuit
- Place of origin: Germany
- Main ingredients: Almonds, spices, sugar, flour, eggs and jam

Muskazine is the name of a German specialty made from almonds, spices, sugar, flour and eggs. It is produced by two cafés in Dettelbach, Germany, throughout the entire year. The biscuits look like a Saint James scallop. It was first mentioned in Literature in 1691 and originated in southern Germany. It is also known in Austria, where it was first mentioned in 1790.

== See also ==
- List of almond dishes
- List of pastries
