= Aboukir almonds =

Almond-filled marzipan sweet

Aboukir almond is a variety of candy or sweet made of almond-filled and sugar-coated marzipan. These almonds are produced in the region of Aboukir in Egypt. The sweet is made with whole almonds that are blanched, then roasted and set aside. More almonds are then made into a paste and coloured green or pink. It is pressed into a ball or an oval. It is kirsch flavored and shaped in the form of a green almond and stuffed with a blanched roasted almond. The product is then dipped in hot sugar syrup and placed on parchment paper to dry.

== See also ==
- Jordan almond
- List of almond dishes
