= Tortas de aceite =

Type of biscuit

Torta de aceite
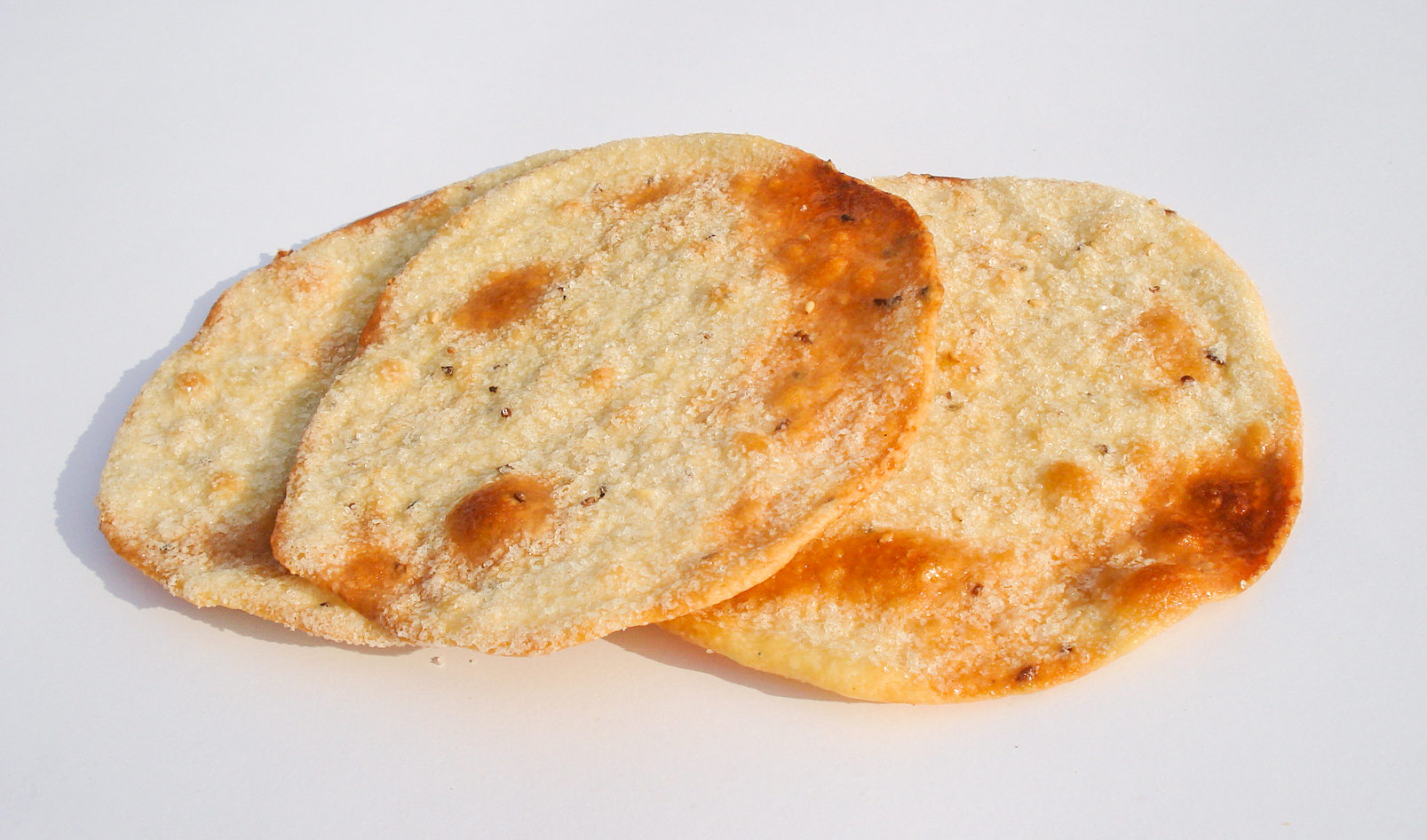
- Tortas de aceite in Spain
- Type: Biscuit
- Place of origin: Spain
- Main ingredients: Wheat flour, olive oil, almonds, sugar, sesame seeds, anise seeds and anise flavor

Torta de aceite, is a light, crisp and flaky sweet biscuit in the shape of a torta.

The main ingredients are wheat flour, olive oil, almonds, sugar, sesame seeds, anise seeds and anise flavor.

The true origin of the olive oil tortas is unknown. On one hand, it is said that they come from an ancient Arab recipe, it is also said that olive oil torta was a traditional sweet created in southern Spain.

== Literary references ==
Guzmán de Alfarache, a novel from the end of 16th or beginning of the 17th century, mentions olive oil tortas; saying:

Dale mis encomiendas, aunque no lo conozco, y dile que me pesa mucho y parte con él de aquesa conserva, que para ti, bien mío, la tenía guardada. Mañana es día de amasijo y te haré una torta de aceite con que sin vergüenza puedas convidar a tus camaradas. (Guzmán, Cátedra, 1987, 486)
Give him my regards, though I do not know him, and tell him I am sorry and bring them this preserved food I kept for you. Tomorrow is the day for kneading and I will prepare an olive oil torta for you to invite your comrades.

They are also mentioned in the novel Don Quijote de la Mancha:

Por eso digo—dijo el del Bosque—que nos dejemos de andar buscando aventuras; y pues tenemos hogazas, no busquemos tortas, y volvámonos a nuestras chozas, que allí nos hallará Dios, si Él quiere. (Quijote, Rico, 734)
This is the reason why I say—said the man of the forest—let's stop looking for adventure; and as we have loaves, we are not going to look for tortas, and let us return to our huts, God will find us there, if He wills.

== See also ==
- List of almond dishes
