= Bitter almond liqueur =

Alcoholic liquor

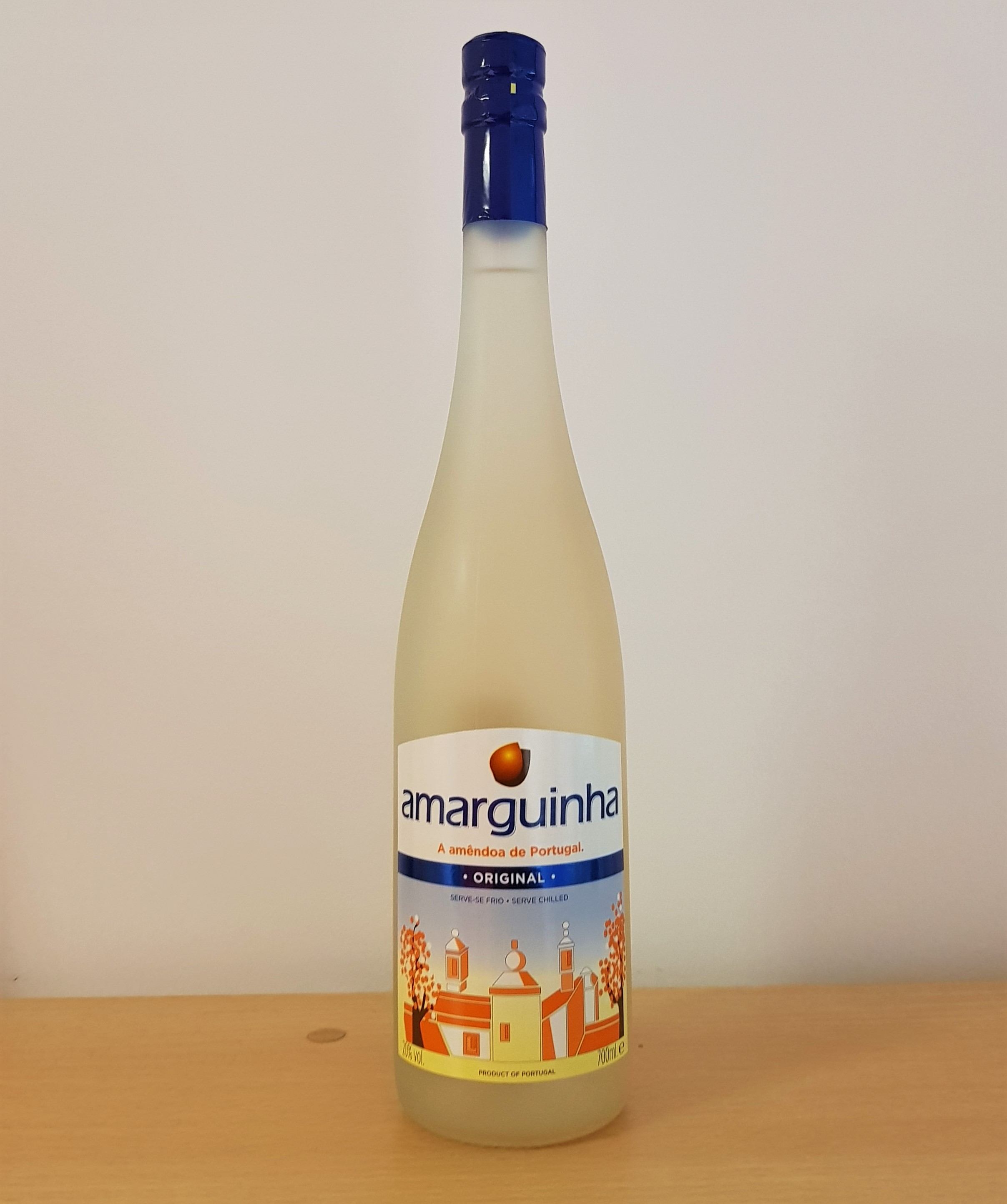
Bitter almond liqueur of the Amarguinha brand from the Algarve region, Portugal

Bitter almond liqueur (Licor de Amêndoa Amarga) is a Portuguese sweet alcoholic liquor, more specifically from the Algarve region. Clear light yellow in colour and with roughly 20% alc/vol, it is one of the most well-known liqueurs in its country of origin. It is made from the seeds of the bitter almond, and is similar in flavour to the Italian amaretto.

== Origin and production ==
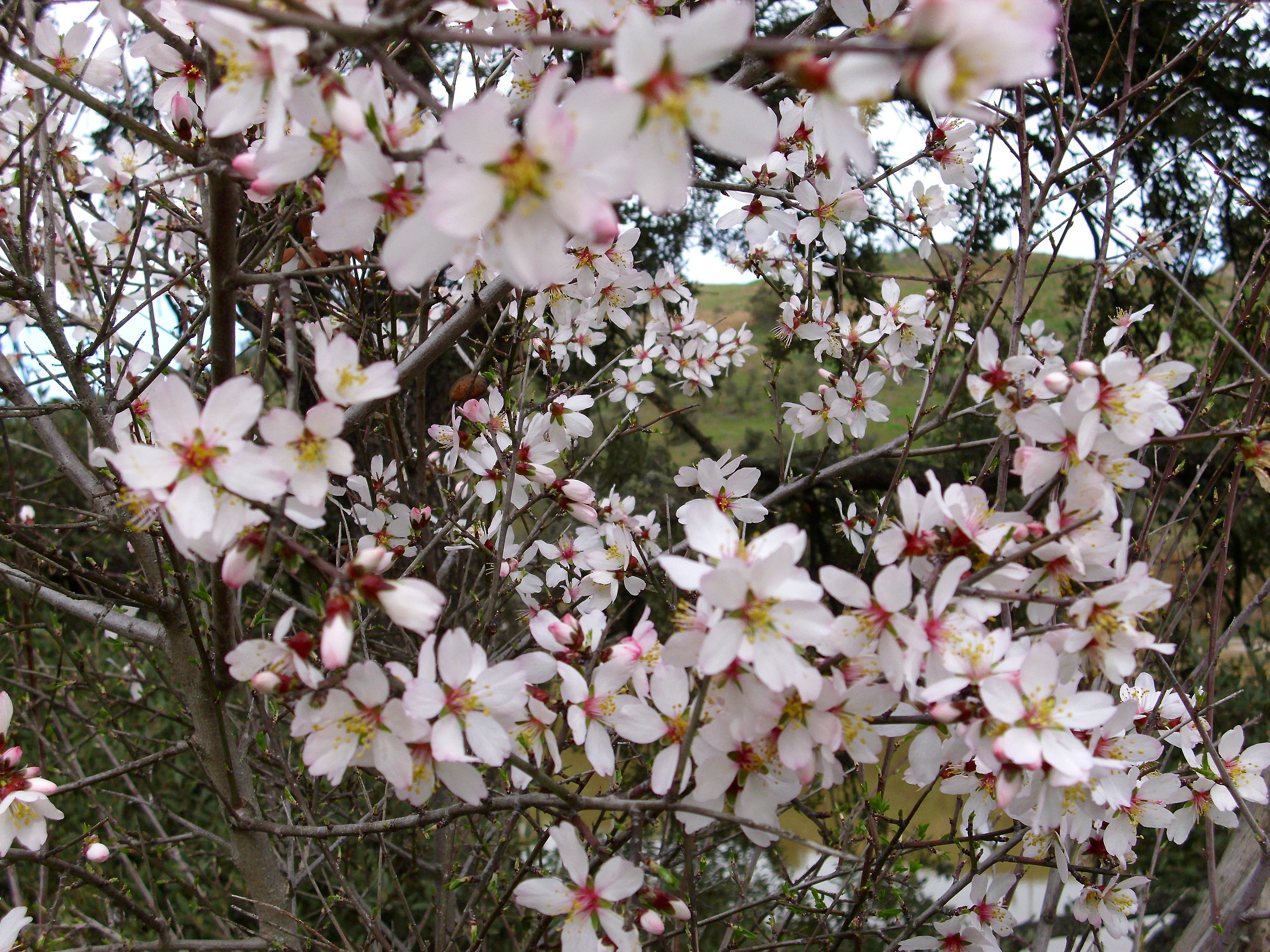
Flowering Prunus dulcis var. amara, the bitter almond tree

The bitter almond (Prunus dulcis var. amara), despite growing plentifully around the Algarve region, was never commonly harvested or consumed. This was due not only to its remarkably bitter flavour, but also to the high concentration of cyanide in its drupes, which can cause severe or even lethal effects if ingested in large amounts.

When crushed, macerated and distilled, however; both the cyanide traces and bitter flavour are completely eliminated. The result of the lengthy process is a smooth and sweet liqueur, which bears no trace of the negative attributes of the raw material used in its production.

== Brands ==
Bitter almond liqueur is currently produced by many different brands in Portugal, mostly brands originated in the region of Algarve in the southern part of the country. Amarguinha, Licor de Amêndoas de Portugal, Xarão and Milbar are among the most widely known brands.

== Usage ==
Bitter almond liqueur is traditionally consumed as an apéritif, as a digestive or inside cocktails. It is also frequently served with ice and with a dash of lemon, its acidity being used to temper the sweetness of the liqueur.

== See also ==
- Amaretto
