= Amlu =

Moroccan spread of almonds, oil, honey

Amlou
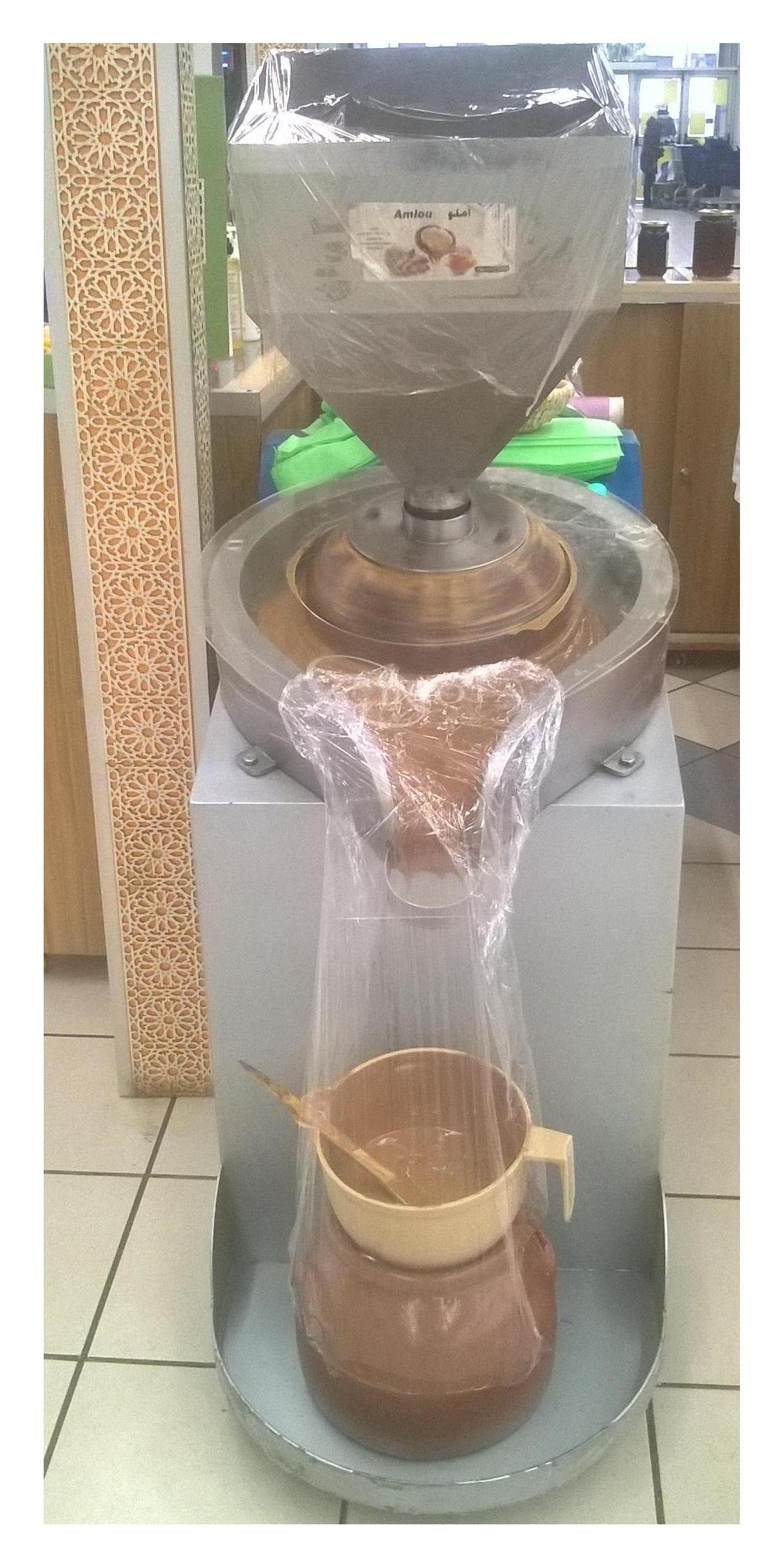
- Type: Spread
- Place of origin: Morocco
- Region or state: Souss
- Created by: Shilha people
- Main ingredients: Almond, honey; Argan oil

Amlu (Berber languages: ⴰⵎⵍⵓ ; Arabic: أملو), also spelled amlou, is a spread used in Moroccan cuisine. It consists of argan oil, almonds and honey. The almonds are toasted, which are then crushed and kneaded with honey and argan oil. Amlou is usually served for breakfast or afternoon tea with pancakes and pastries.

Amlu is one of the multiple uses of argan oil. In Shilha cuisine, argan oil plays the role usually held by olive oil in other parts of the Maghreb.

== See also ==
- Cooking oil
- List of almond dishes
- List of spreads
