= Biscuit Tortoni =

Italian frozen dairy dessert

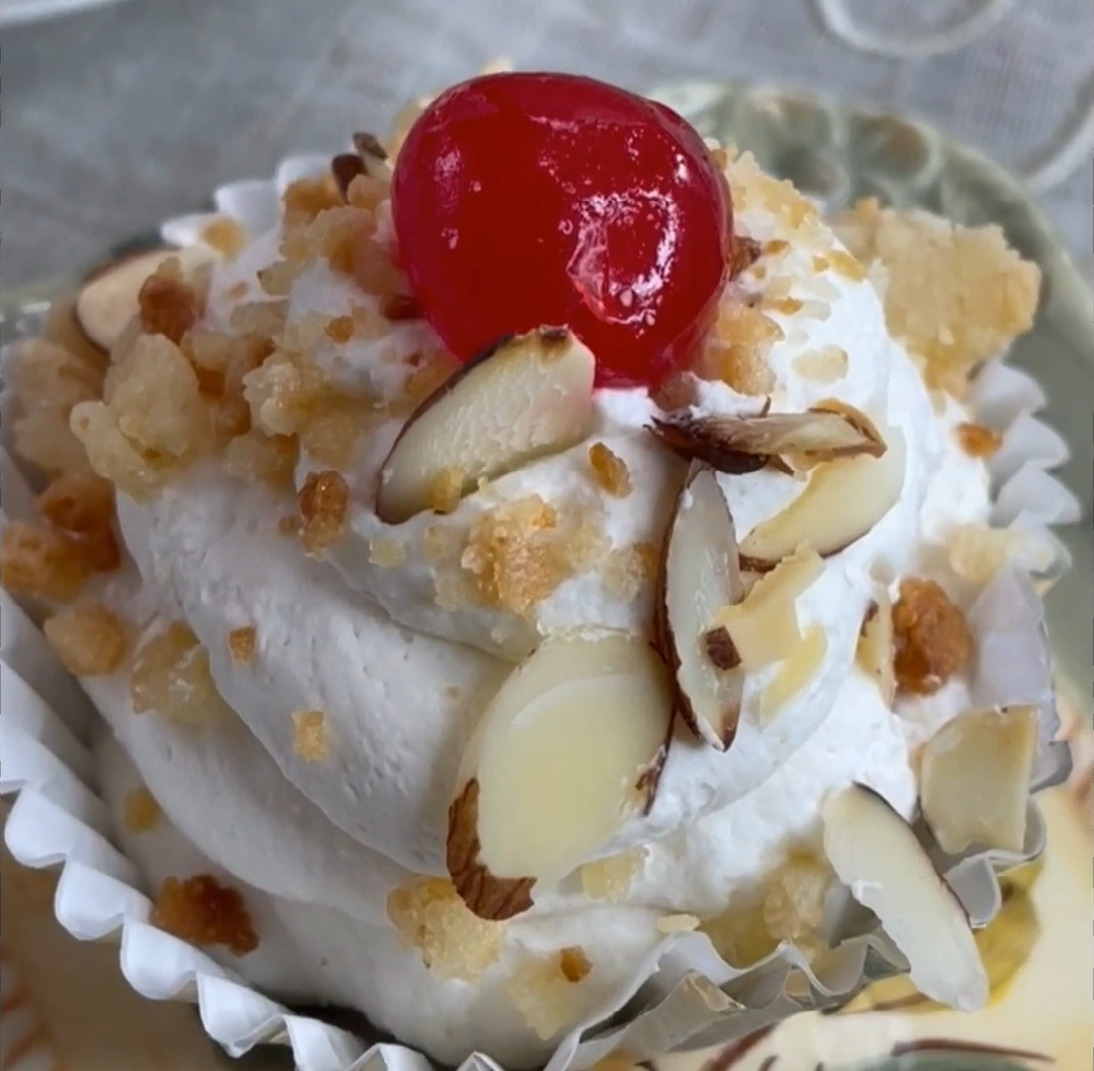
- Type: Ice cream
- Place of origin: France
- Serving temperature: Cold
- Main ingredients: Eggs, heavy cream

Biscuit Tortoni is an ice cream made with eggs and heavy cream, often containing chopped cherries or topped with minced almonds or crumbled macaroons. It is believed to be named after an Italian café owner in Paris in the 18th century.

The dish has appeared on restaurant menus in the United States since 1899, if not earlier.

== See also ==
- List of almond dishes
