= Königsberg marzipan =

Type of marzipan from Kaliningrad

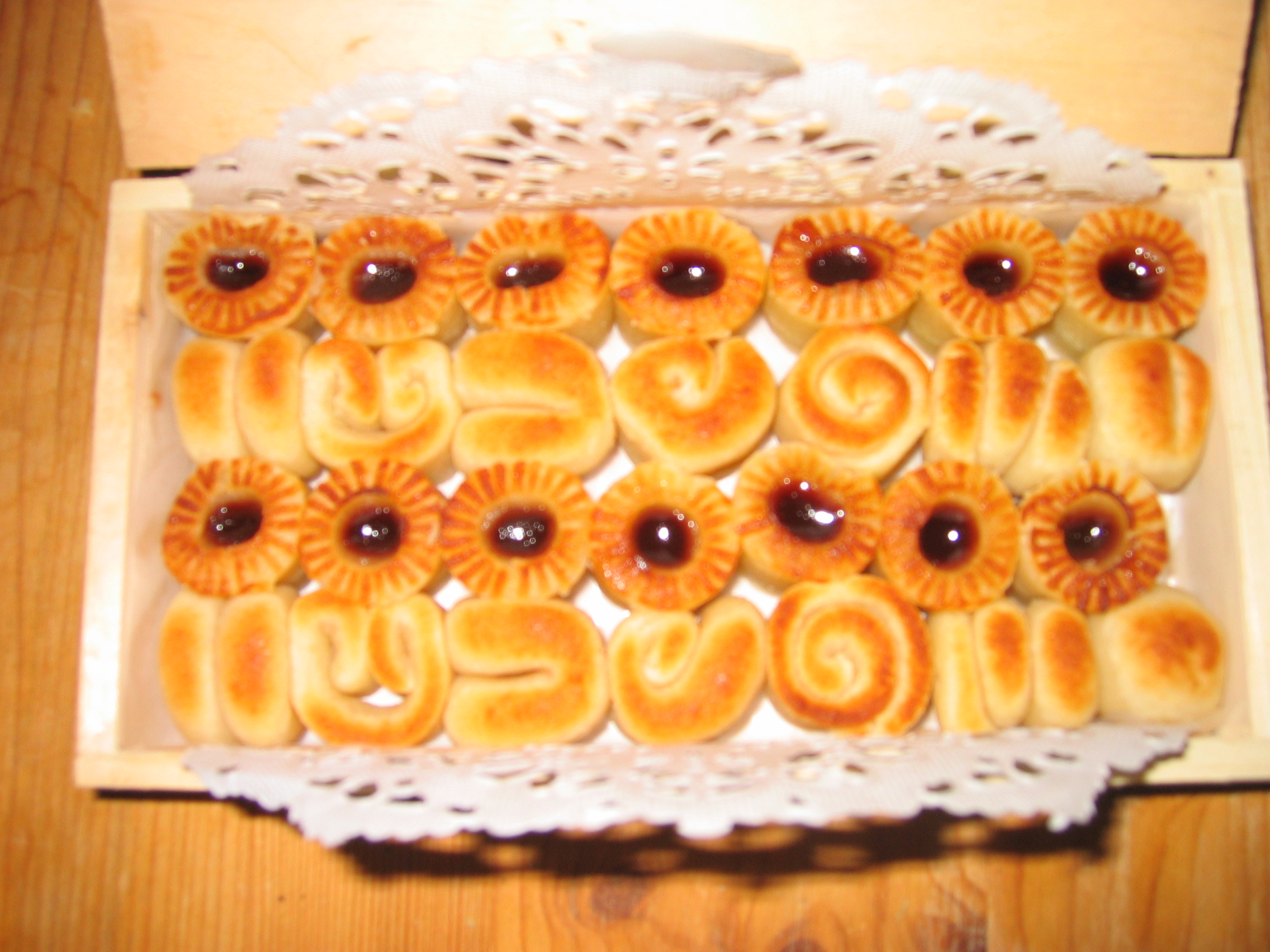
Königsberg-style marzipan

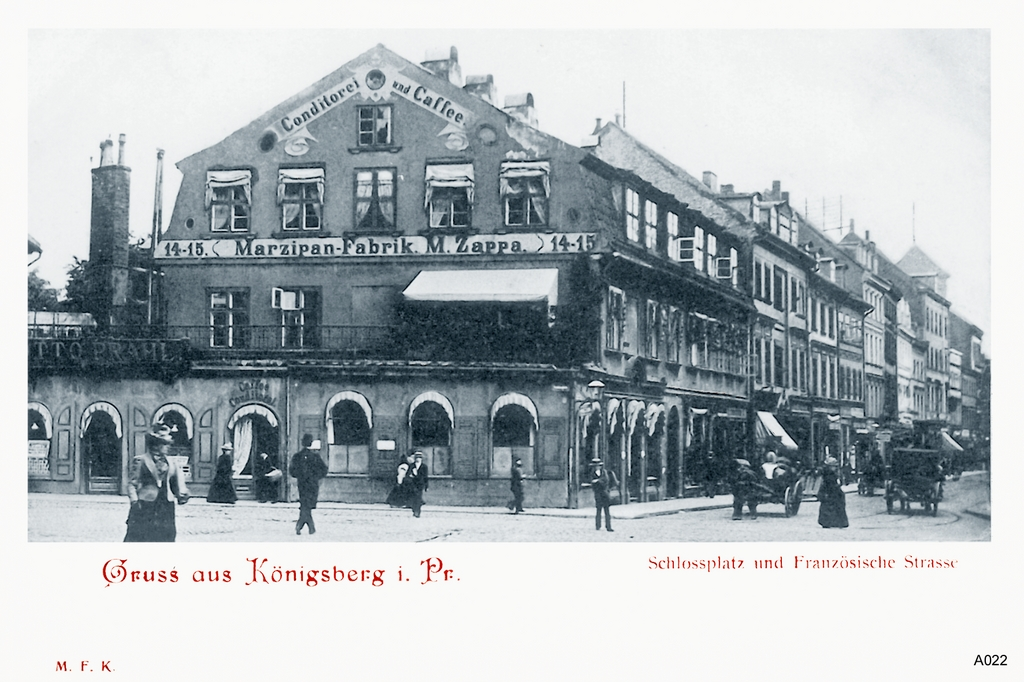
M. Zappa Königsberger marzipan factory on the "Französische Straße" near Königsberg Castle

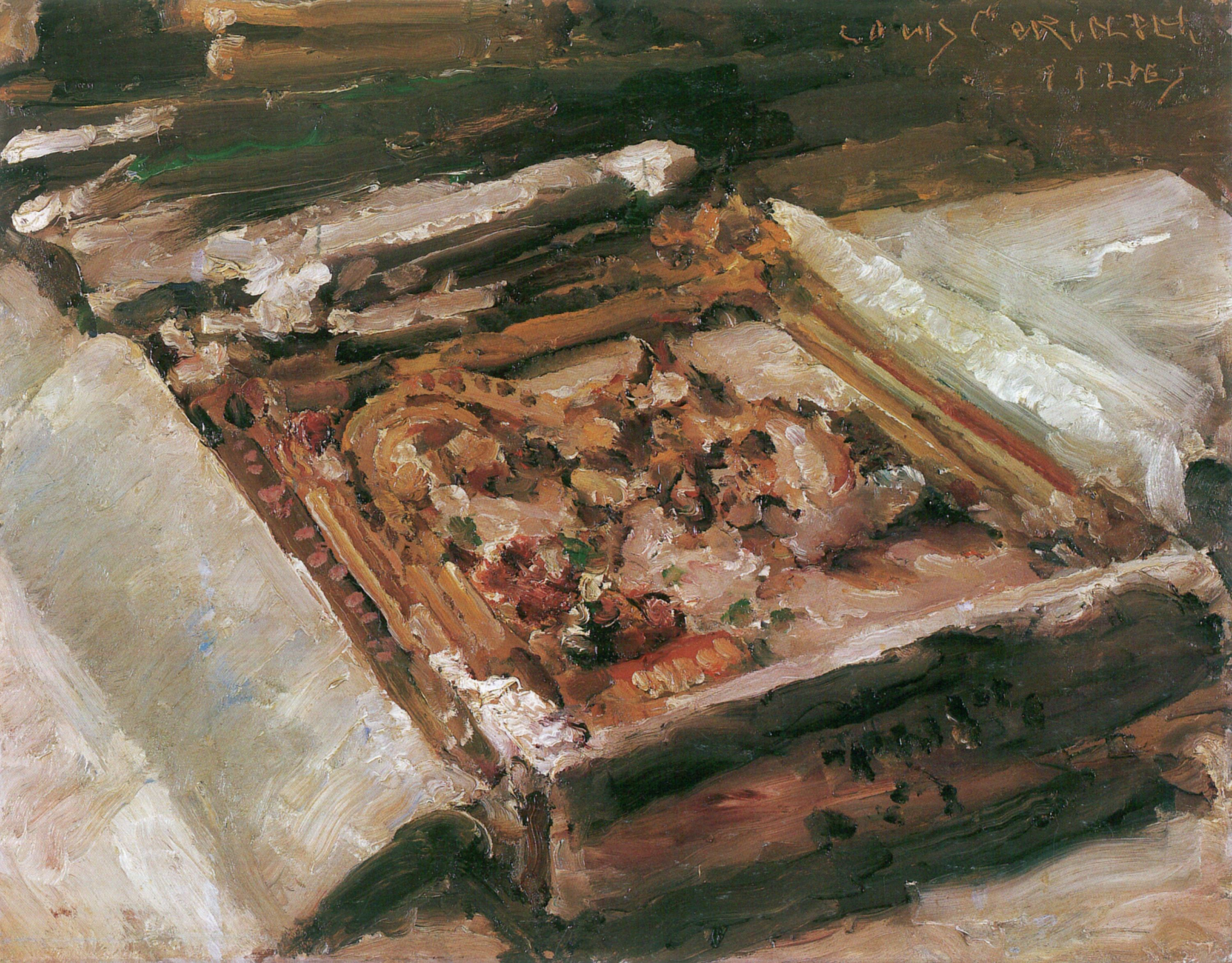
Königsberger Marzipantorte (marzipan cake) painting by Lovis Corinth

Königsberg marzipan is a type of marzipan traditionally produced in the former German city of Königsberg (now Kaliningrad, Russia). Königsberg's first marzipan production was established by the Pomatti brothers in 1809, who became confectioners of the Royal Prussian Court. They were joined by Sterkau, Petschliess, Liedtke, Siegel, Steiner, Gehlhaar (today Wiesbaden), Plouda in Kneiphof, as well as Wald in Berlin and Schwermer in Bad Wörishofen. Königsberg marzipan is known for its flamed surface, which results in a golden-brown finish. It contains rose water and is often filled with jam. These characteristics distinguish it from the more common Lübeck Marzipan, which also frequently comes in more elaborate forms.

== Producers ==
After World War II Königsberg became part of the Soviet Union under the Potsdam Agreement. Most Germans fled or were forcibly expelled. The traditional production of Marzipan in Königsberg thus ceased to exist; the style was kept alive by confectioners such as Gehlhaar, a confectioner and candy shop located in Wiesbaden, Germany. Their products include marzipan candies. The business was established in 1912. Along with Schwermer, Gehlhaar was one of the two largest marzipan producers in Königsberg in the early 20th century.

== See also ==
- List of almond dishes
