= Amarguinha =

Portuguese bitter almond liqueur

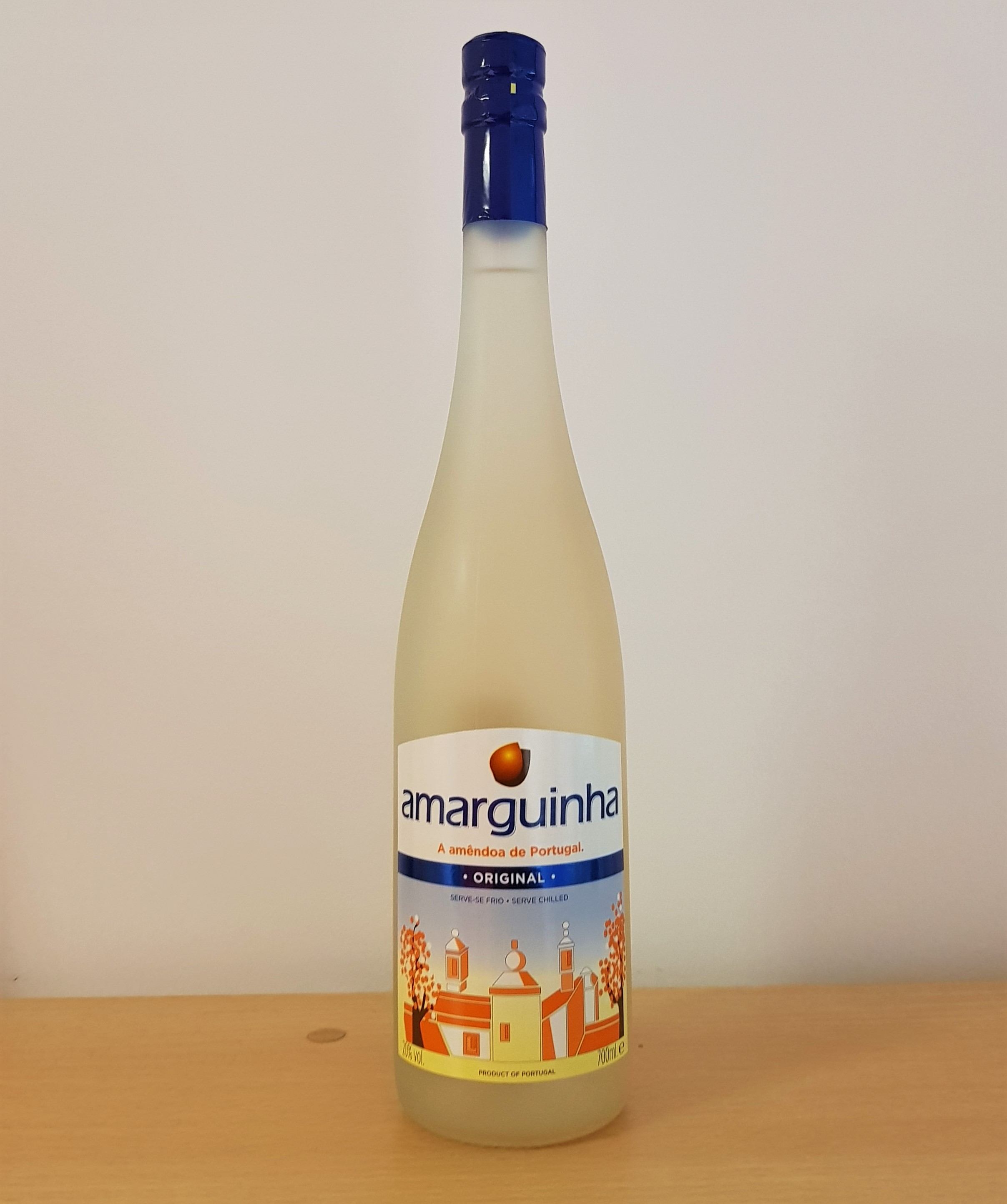
A bottle of Amarguinha Original

Amarguinha is a traditional brand of Portuguese bitter almond liqueur from the Algarve region, in Portugal. The ingredients include water, sugar, alcohol, flavoring and caramel coloring. Currently, Amarguinha is produced by Destilatum, and distributed by Casa Redondo.

With the slogan A amêndoa de Portugal, "The Portuguese almond," it is available in two flavours: original & lemon, the latter having been released during the summer of 2012. The original flavour has a pale yellow colour, while the lemon version is a brighter yellow, similar to the almond drupes themselves. Both are rated at 20% ABV, and are sold in 700 ml bottles.

== Usage ==
Amarguinha may be consumed as an aperitif, digestif or used to prepare cocktails. It is normally drunk cold or on ice; sometimes with drops of lemon juice or a lemon slice.
