= Sarawak layer cake =

Type of layer cake from Malaysia

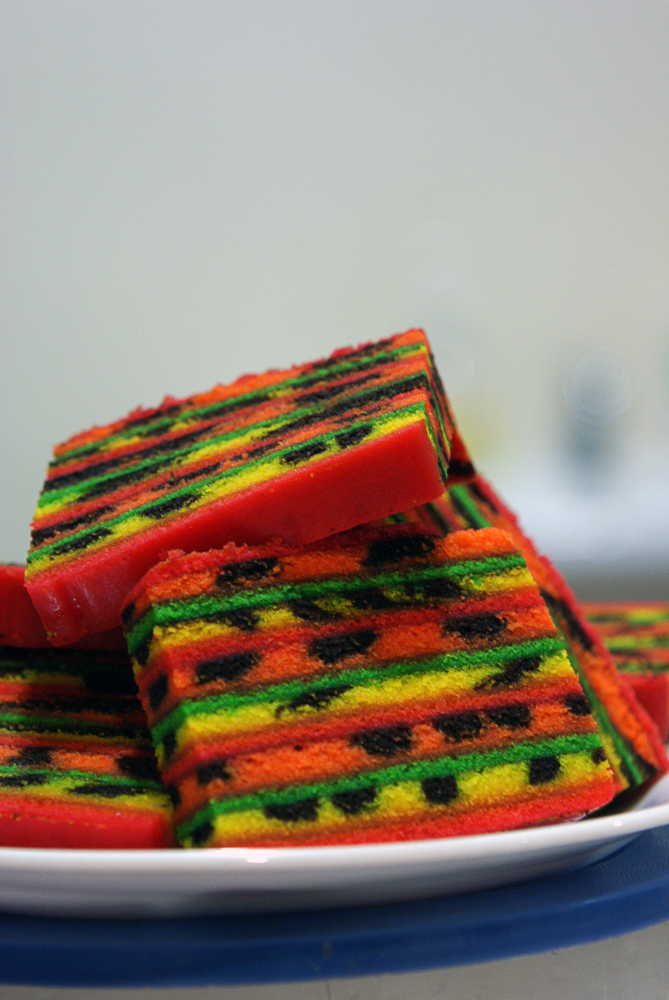
- A colourful kek lapis containing raisins
- Alternative names: Kek lapis Sarawak, kek lapis moden Sarawak, Kek Sarawak, and kek lapis
- Type: Layer cake
- Place of origin: Malaysia
- Region or state: Sarawak
- Main ingredients: Butter or vegetable oil, milk, eggs, jam

Sarawak layer cake (Malay: kek lapis Sarawak or kek lapis; Jawi: كيك لاڤيس سراوق) is a delicacy from the state of Sarawak, Malaysia, which comes in normal layers or in intricate patterns. It is often served on special occasions, such as cultural and religious celebrations, including marriages and birthdays.

Sarawak layer cakes are often baked and served for religious or cultural celebrations such as Eid ul-Fitr, Christmas, Lunar New Year, Deepavali, Gawai, birthdays and weddings. Sarawak layer cakes can be found almost everywhere in Sarawak and is a favourite gift bought by visitors as it is available all year around. These demands open up the doors to the development of the kek lapis Sarawak baking industry.

== History ==
The Sarawak layer cake, with its origin rooted in Indonesia's lapis legit or kek lapis Betawi (Batavia, the old name of Jakarta), draws influence from a European spit cake made by Dutch administrator's wives during the colonial period in Batavia. It found its way to Sarawak in the 1970s and 1980s, brought in by the Betawis.

Originally served during evening tea, this spiced Betawi cake boasted a unique blend of spices like cinnamon, cardamom, clove, and star anise, creating a distinctive flavour profile. As the Betawi community spread across Peninsular Malaysia, Johoreans especially embraced the recipe, preserving its original spiced essence.

However, Sarawak took a distinctive path, infusing new ingredients, flavours, and colours into the layered cake, leading to the emergence of the modern Sarawak layer cake.

This innovative adaptation occurred as the Sarawak people added their own touches to the traditional recipe, resulting in a delightful variation unique to the region.

== Characteristics ==
Sarawakian modern layered cakes can be divided into two types: cakes with ordinary layers and cakes with patterns, motifs, or shapes. All must have at least two colours. The cake can be baked in an oven or microwave. The batter uses butter, margarine or vegetable oil, milk, and eggs, and requires a strong arm or electric mixer to be properly prepared. The baked cake has a high, firm texture and the layers are fastened together with jam or a similarly sticky sweet substance. More detailed cakes often require special moulds to maintain the perfect layer thickness.

BBC in its article, described it:

Also called the Sarawak layer cake, kek lapis typically has a minimum of 12 layers. The cake is created by carefully adding one thin layer of batter after another onto a baking pan every few minutes, broiling (or grilling) each layer in the oven to ensure the lower layers are never burnt. The plain version alternates light and dark strips of cake batter, whereas the coloured cakes have geometric patterns that, depending on the final pattern, can involve 20 or more layers. The final cake is cooled and then cut into strips, with different pieces reassembled using thick jam or condensed milk as adhesive. Often, multiple cakes have to be baked, and pieces from each of them are assembled to create a complex pattern. This is then wrapped up in a thin cake layer of a single colour, or arranged between two sets of plain (ie, with no colours or patterns) multi-layered cakes.

== Protected geographical indication ==
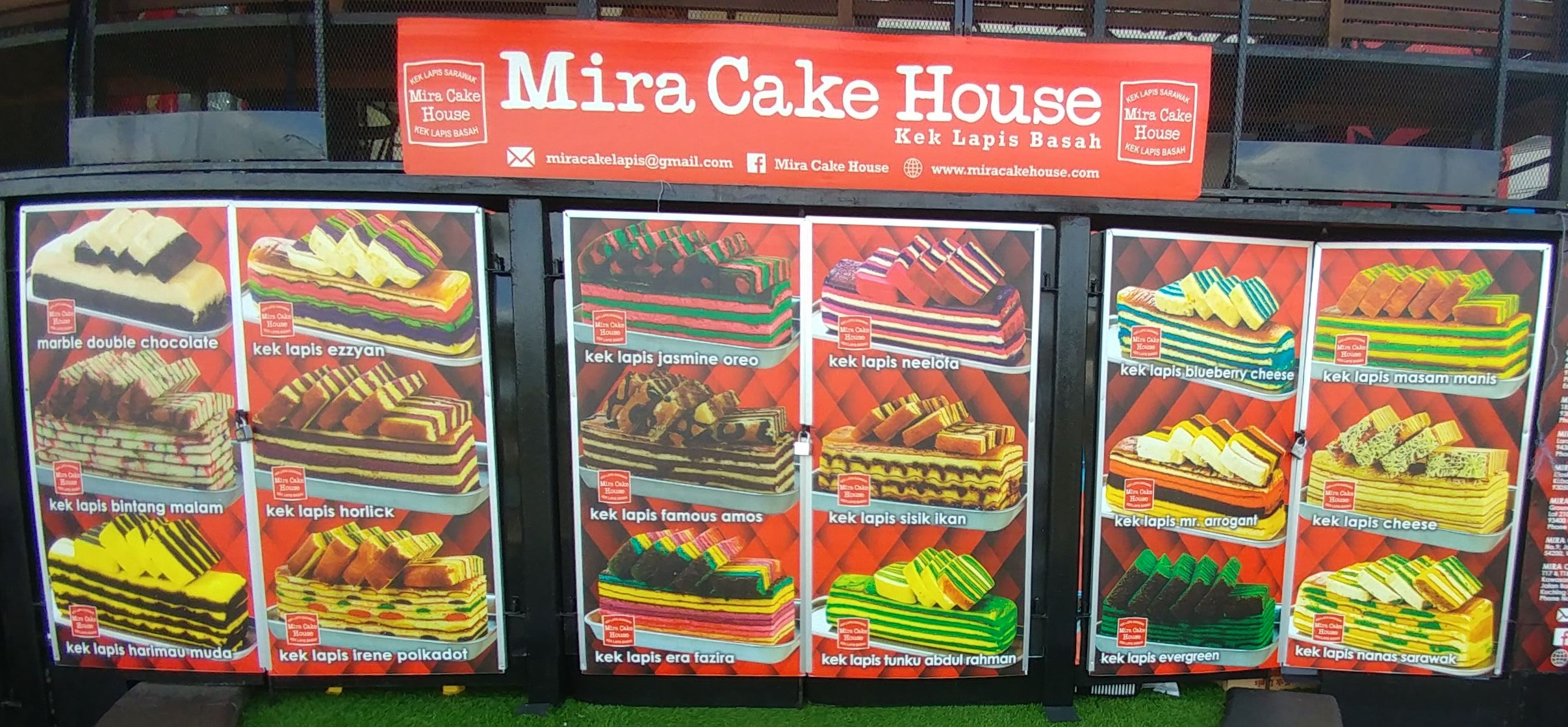
Varieties of Kek Lapis on display in Kuching, Sarawak

In Malaysia, kek lapis Sarawak (Sarawak layer cake) has been a protected geographical indication since 2010. This means that any product may only be called "kek lapis Sarawak/Sarawak layer cake" if it is manufactured in Sarawak according to the specifications of the Sarawak Layer Cake Manufacturers Association. It is illegal to label a similarly manufactured cake "kek lapis Sarawak/Sarawak layer cake" if it is not actually made in Sarawak, and strictly speaking, producers outside the state may only legally name their products "Sarawak-style" layer cake.

== See also ==
- Lapis legit – Indonesian layered cake
- Kue lapis – Southeast Asian layered cake
- List of cakes
