= Khanom chan =

Dessert in Thai cuisine

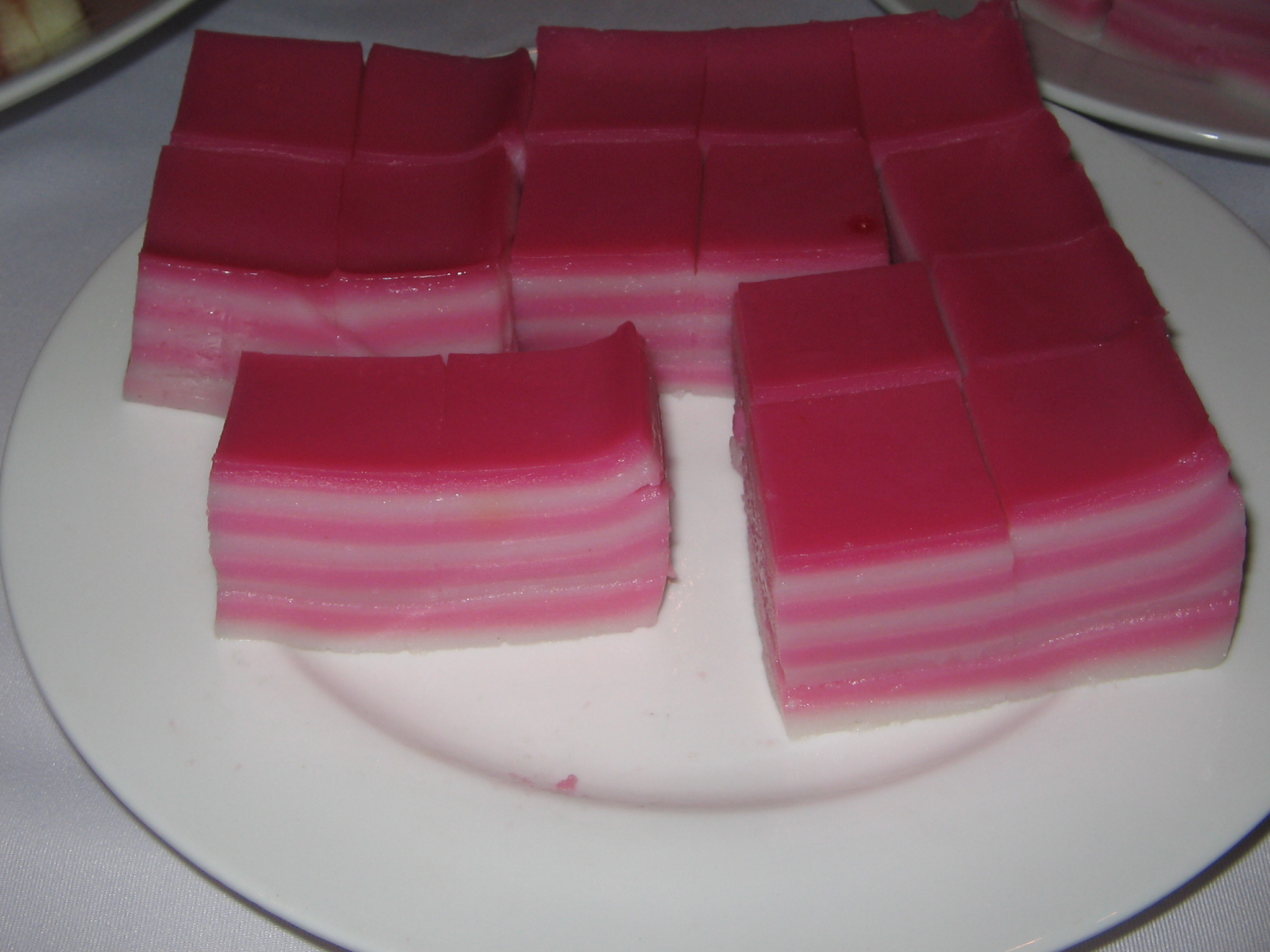
- Khanom chan prepared with pink food coloring
- Type: Dessert
- Place of origin: Thailand
- Region or state: Southeast Asia
- Associated cuisine: Thailand

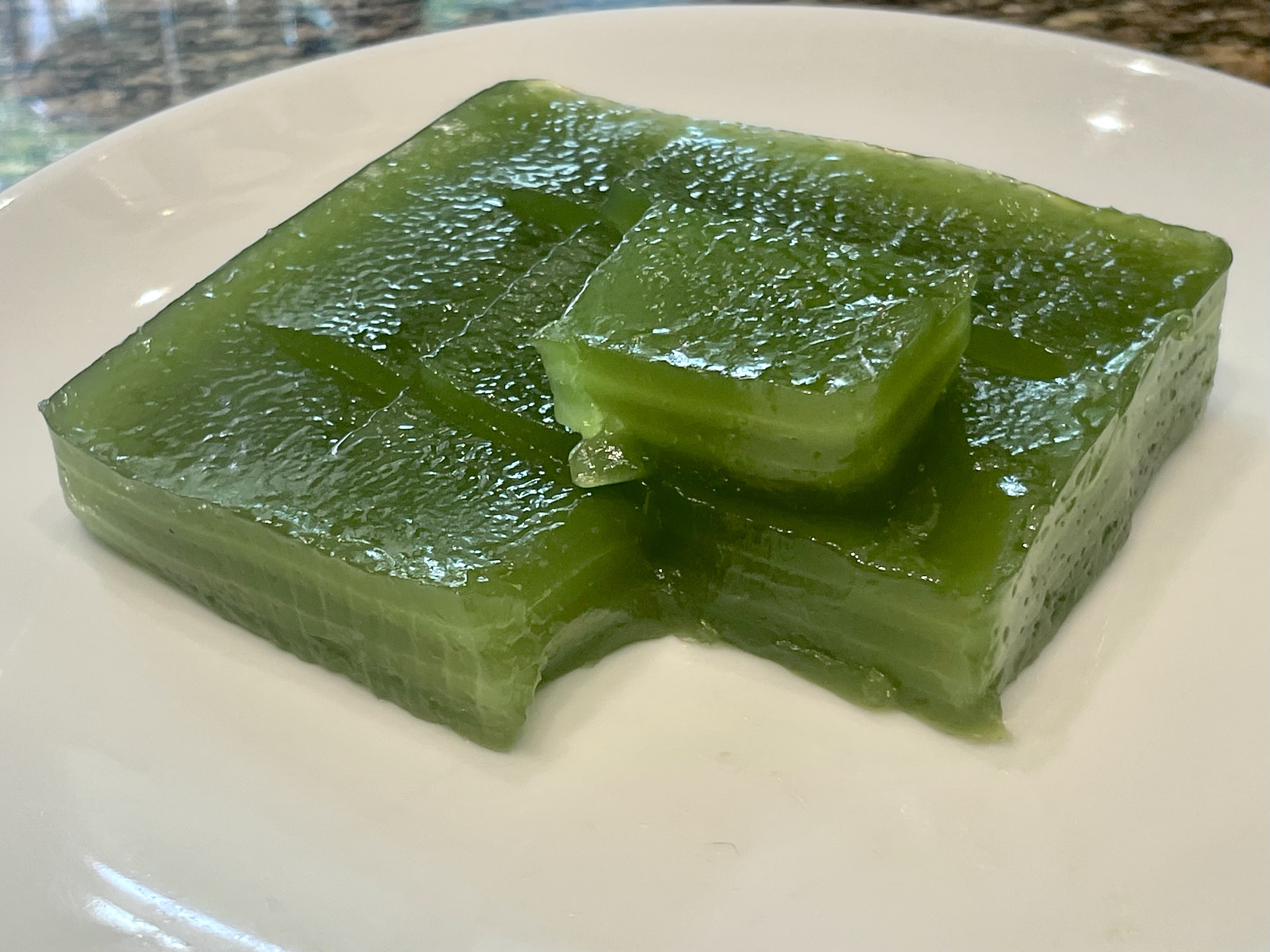
Khanom Chan prepared with Pandan and coconut flavor

Khanom chan (Thai: ขนมชั้น, pronounced [kʰānǒm t͡ɕʰán]) is an ancient Thai khanom, or dessert. Originating from the Sukhothai Period, the dessert is a staple snack in Thai cuisine, and Thai people usually prepare it for auspicious ceremonies is a traditional Thai dessert distinguished by its layered appearance and method of preparation. It is typically made from tapioca flour, rice flour, and coconut milk.

Khanom chan is fragrant, subtly sweet, and slightly oily from the addition of the coconut milk; its texture is smooth yet sticky.

== Name and origin ==
Its name derives from two Thai words: “khanom” (Thai: ขนม) meaning "dessert", and “chan” (Thai: ชั้น) meaning "layer" or "layers".

The dessert has its origins in the Sukhothai Period, when foreign trade with China and India contributed to cultural exchanges, including that of food. As a result, the food was developed from ingredients that came from many nations and was adapted to suit the living conditions of local people.

== History ==
A classic steamed dessert in Thailand, Khanom Chan is also popular in Malaysia, Singapore, Laos, Indonesia, the Philippines, and Vietnam, and other Southeast Asian countries. It is one of several multilayer coconut-based desserts that are frequently made in the area. Khanom Chan’s precise origin is unknown and cannot be linked to a particular nation. However, some accounts claim that during the Dutch colonial era in Indonesia, around the reign of King Rama I, dessert-making methods from Indonesia had an impact on its growth. Local groups gradually adopted these methods, switching from baking to steaming to better suit local cooking customs and equipment. Because of its layered look, which is sometimes connected to prosperity and advancement, Khanom Chan has become a well-known traditional delicacy in Thailand and is frequently made for important celebrations and auspicious events.

== Description ==
Khanom Chan is distinguished by its square, layered shape, fragrant aroma, mildly sweet flavor, and smooth yet slightly sticky texture, with a subtle richness derived from coconut milk. It normally has up to nine layers, which are said to be auspicious, and is often colored green using pandan leaf extract. At auspicious events like housewarming celebrations and memorial services for departed family members, it is frequently offered. It is believed to bring happiness and prosperity to both the maker and the consumer.

== Usage ==
In a complete serving, a minimum of nine layers of the dessert are prepared and eaten. The number nine has connotations of prosperity in the Thai language: "nine" (Thai: เก้า) is a homophone of the phrase "to step forward" (Thai: ก้าว). As a result, khanom chan is often seen as representing prosperity in life and promotion in one's occupation.

Because of its positive connotations, khanom chan is often used in sacred ceremonies such as in home philanthropy or weddings; with nine layers or more the snack is believed to bring happiness and progress for both the maker and eater.

Because of this belief, some areas of Thailand have given the dessert other names to make it more prosperous, such as khanom chan farh (Thai: ขนมชั้นฟ้า).

== Similar desserts ==
=== Malaysia ===
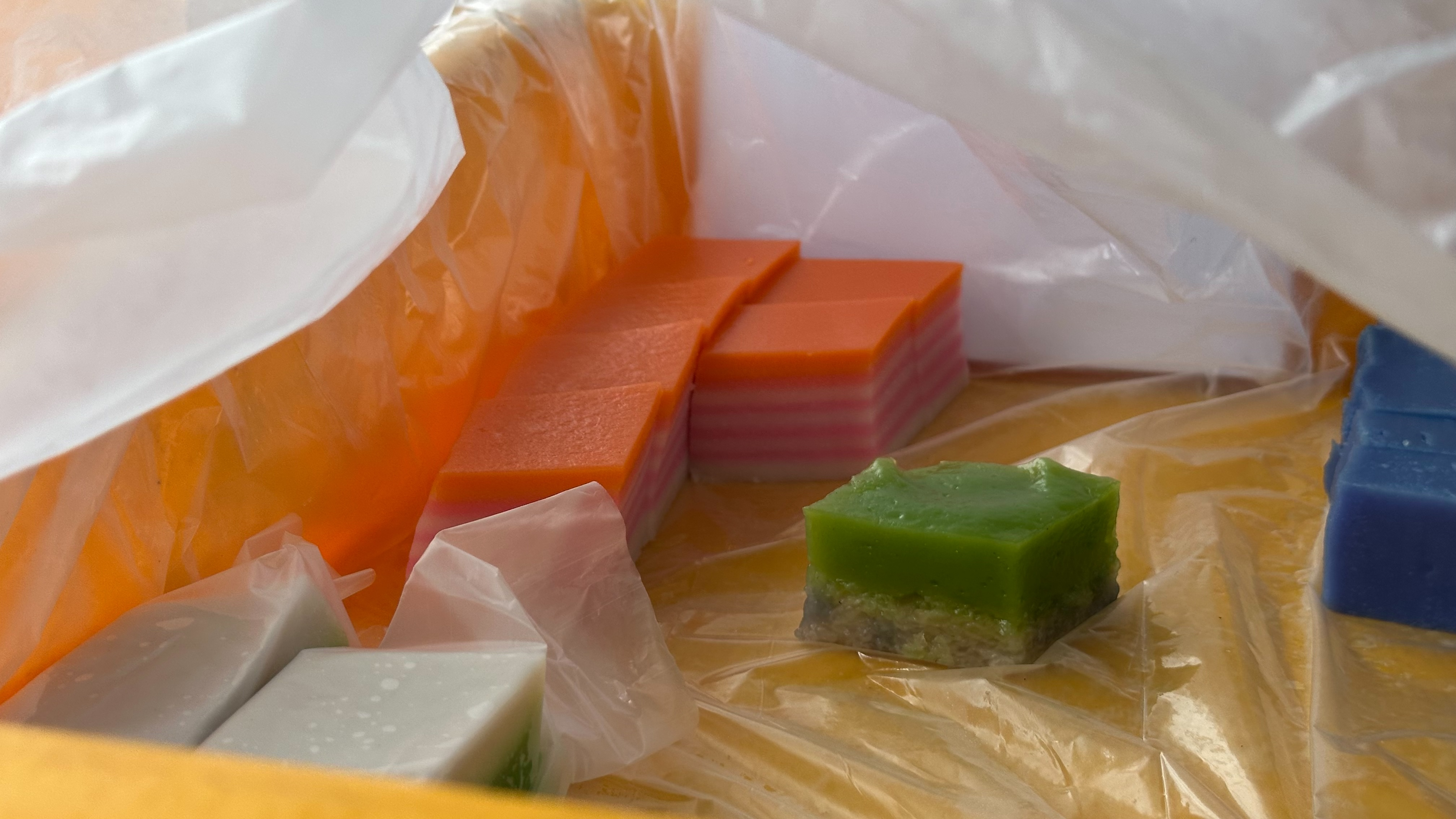
Kuih Lapis from a Malaysian morning market in Gelugor, Penang

Kuih Lapis (Malay: kuih lapis, lit. ‘layered cake’) is a traditional Malaysian steamed dessert made primarily from a mixture of rice flour, tapioca flour, coconut milk, and sugar. Its distinctive feature is its vibrant, multi-colored layers—traditionally pink, green, and white—which are steamed individually to create a soft, slightly sticky, and chewy texture.

Within the Peranakan Chinese community in regions like Penang, the nine-layered variant is referred to as jiu ceng kueh (九层粿), where the stacked layers symbolize a wish for an unbroken lineage and continuous generational prosperity.

=== Singapore ===
Kueh Lapis Kukus (Malay: kueh lapis kukus, lit. ‘steamed layered cake’) is a traditional Nyonya dessert widely enjoyed in Singapore. In Chinese, it is known as jiu ceng gao (九层糕), and in Hokkien as kow chang kueh, both of which translate to "nine-layered cake". This vibrant, sticky dessert is made from tapioca flour and rice flour, tapioca flour and rice flour, which are blended with rich coconut milk and fragrant pandan essence. The resulting colorful layers create a sweet treat with a bouncy, chewy texture that is deeply rooted in local Peranakan culinary traditions. As in other regions, its tiered structure also carries cultural weight during festive occasions, symbolizing upward progress and continuous success.

=== Indonesia ===
Kue Lapis (Indonesian: kue lapis, lit. ‘layered cake’) is a traditional steamed dessert prevalent throughout Indonesia, celebrated for its vibrant, multi-layered aesthetics and soft, gelatinous texture. From the 14th to the 20th centuries, Chinese immigrants from southern China brought steamed rice cakes, or jiu ceng gao (九层糕), to maritime Southeast Asia. The dessert is believed to have originated from these Chinese steamed rice cakes. The original Chinese dish was modified using native Southeast Asian ingredients, including coconut milk, pandan leaves, and tapioca flour, as these immigrant families assimilated with the local Indonesian inhabitants, helping to create Peranakan Chinese culture. This steamed, pudding-like dessert should be distinguished from Kue lapis legit (spekkoek), a rich, baked layer cake with Dutch-Indonesian roots, in Indonesian cuisine. The vibrant colors of the traditional steamed Kue lapis add to its festive appeal and cultural resonance, and it is often served during religious ceremonies and celebrations.

=== Laos ===
Khao nom sun (Laos: ເຂົ້າໜົມຊັ້ນ, lit. ‘layered dessert’) is a Lao dish prepared of tapioca flour, rice flour, and coconut milk.

=== Vietnamese ===
Banh Da Lon (Vietnamese: bánh da lợn, lit. ‘pig skin cake’) is a traditional Vietnamese steamed layered dessert that is especially popular in southern Vietnam. It is particularly prominent during Tết (Lunar New Year), especially in years corresponding to the zodiac sign of the Pig. The dessert is also commonly prepared for other important occasions, including the Mid-Autumn Festival (Tết Trung Thu), the Ullambana Festival (Vu Lan), and various family gatherings. Its popularity is attributed not only to its sweet flavor but also to its symbolic layered structure, which is often interpreted as representing good fortune, prosperity, and continuity.

=== Philippines ===
Sapin-Sapin (Filipino: kakanin, lit. ‘having several layers’) It is a popular Filipino dessert commonly served at potlucks, family get-togethers, bakeries, and particularly during Christmas . This dish is made using sugar, coconut milk, and glutinous rice flour as a basis. Common taste variations include jackfruit, ube, and coconut. Latik, a roasted coconut milk residue that gives the meal a deep scent and texture, is usually added on top. It has a chewy, soft texture that is like the consistency of gelatin and pounded Japanese mochi.

== Ingredients & Preparation ==
The main ingredients include sugar syrup, coconut milk (Concentrated coconut milk extract), rice flour, arrowroot flour, mung bean flour, a flour blend, pigment / food coloring (often red, used to tint half of the batter), a lubricant (such as oil, used to grease the mold before steaming)

The dessert is prepared through a step-by-step process of mixing, layering, and steaming. After cooking the sugar syrup and coconut milk separately, they are allowed to cool. They are then combined with flour to produce a homogeneous batter. After that, the batter is separated into sections; often, one component is left plain while another is colored to produce distinct layers.

Next, the batter is cooked by steaming. A greased mold is filled with a small layer of batter, which is then heated until it solidifies. Another layer of a different color is then added on top. In order to maintain the layers' distinct separation, this procedure is performed layer by layer, ensuring that each layer is completely set before adding the subsequent one.

After finishing all the layers, the dessert is allowed to cool fully. This step is crucial because it helps the dessert solidify, which makes it simpler to cut into even, clean pieces.

Tapioca flour is used to make the dessert soft, sticky, viscous, and transparent. Arrowroot starch makes the dessert more sticky, but is less transparent than tapioca flour. Rice flour and mung bean flour give it firmness to hold its shape.

== See also ==
- Kue lapis, a similar Indonesian kue (dessert)
- Bánh da lợn, a similar Vietnamese dessert
- Thai cuisine
- List of Thai desserts
- List of Thai dishes (includes names in Thai script)
- List of Thai ingredients (includes names in Thai script)
