= Beulah Levy Ledner =

New Orleans dessert and pastry chef

External images
- Images of the Beulah Levy Ledner
- Ledner in a kitchen, image from myneworleans.com

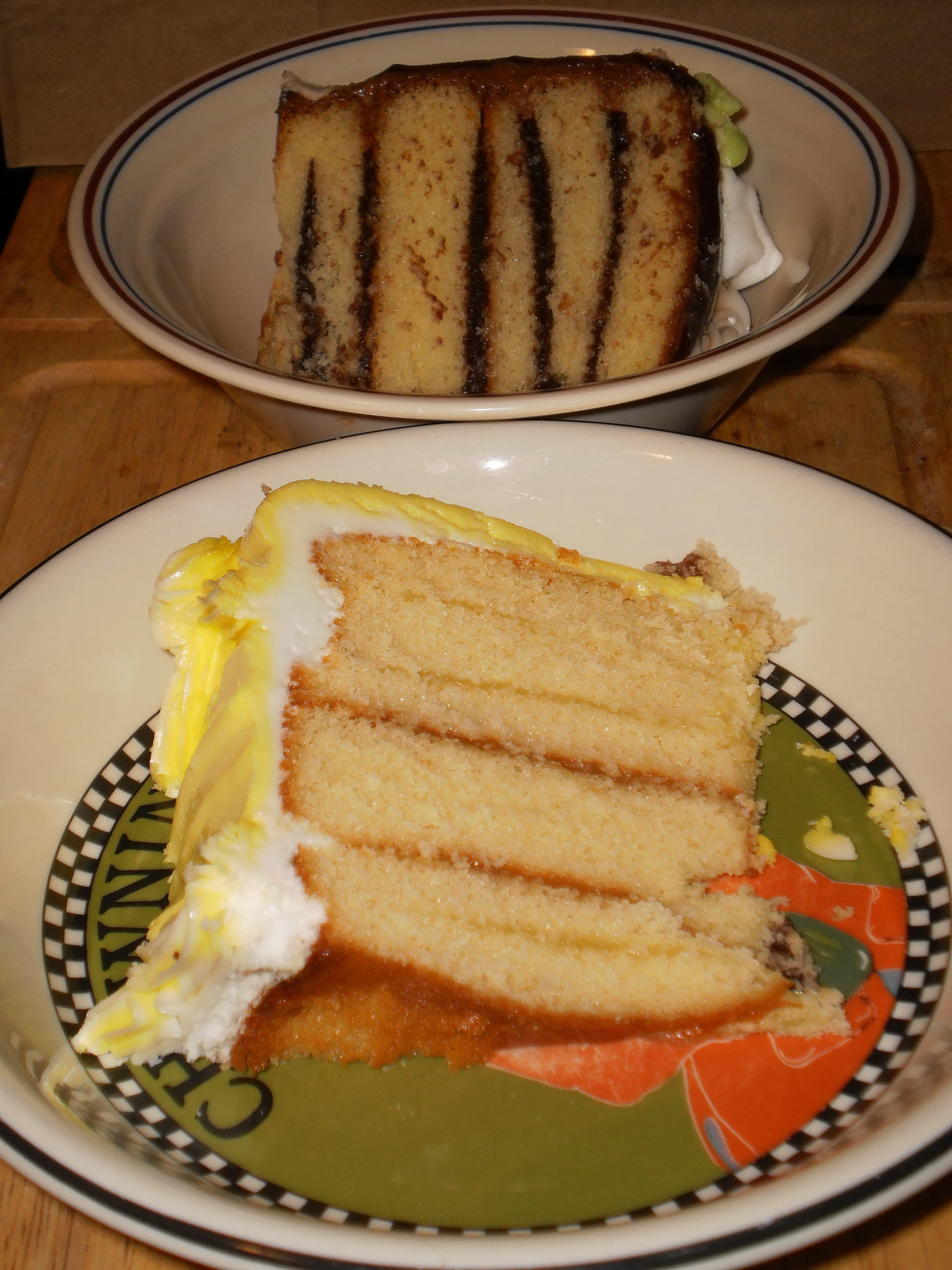
Doberge cake slices

Beulah Levy Ledner (January 5, 1894 – March 30, 1988) was a dessert and pastry chef in New Orleans, Louisiana, who was most noted for her invention of Doberge cakes, which were an adaptation for Louisiana tastes of the Hungarian/Austrian dish dobos torte.

Ledner was born in St. Rose, Louisiana, to a family of Hungarian-Jewish immigrant bakers. She started her own bakery business in New Orleans in 1931. The Ledner bakery was initially known as "Mrs. Charles Ledner's Superior Home Baking," operating out of the family's home. The bakery relocated several times subsequently as it grew. She sold her bakery business to Gambino's Bakery as a result of the hardships of World War II but subsequently opened a new bakery in Metairie, Louisiana, following the war's end. Ledner's recipes reflected the German and Jewish influence on New Orleans cuisine in the mid-20th century.

Ledner's recipes have been collected and published, and various versions of the Doberge recipe are available on-line, including a photograph of the traditional multiple thin layers used in the authentic Doberge recipe. A video narrative of the preparation of Doberge cakes in the tradition of Ledner is available on-line. Ledner has at times been referred to as the "Doberge Queen of New Orleans".

Ledner's son Albert C. Ledner was a noted architect.
