= Dobash cake =

Layered chocolate cake popular in Hawaii

Dobash
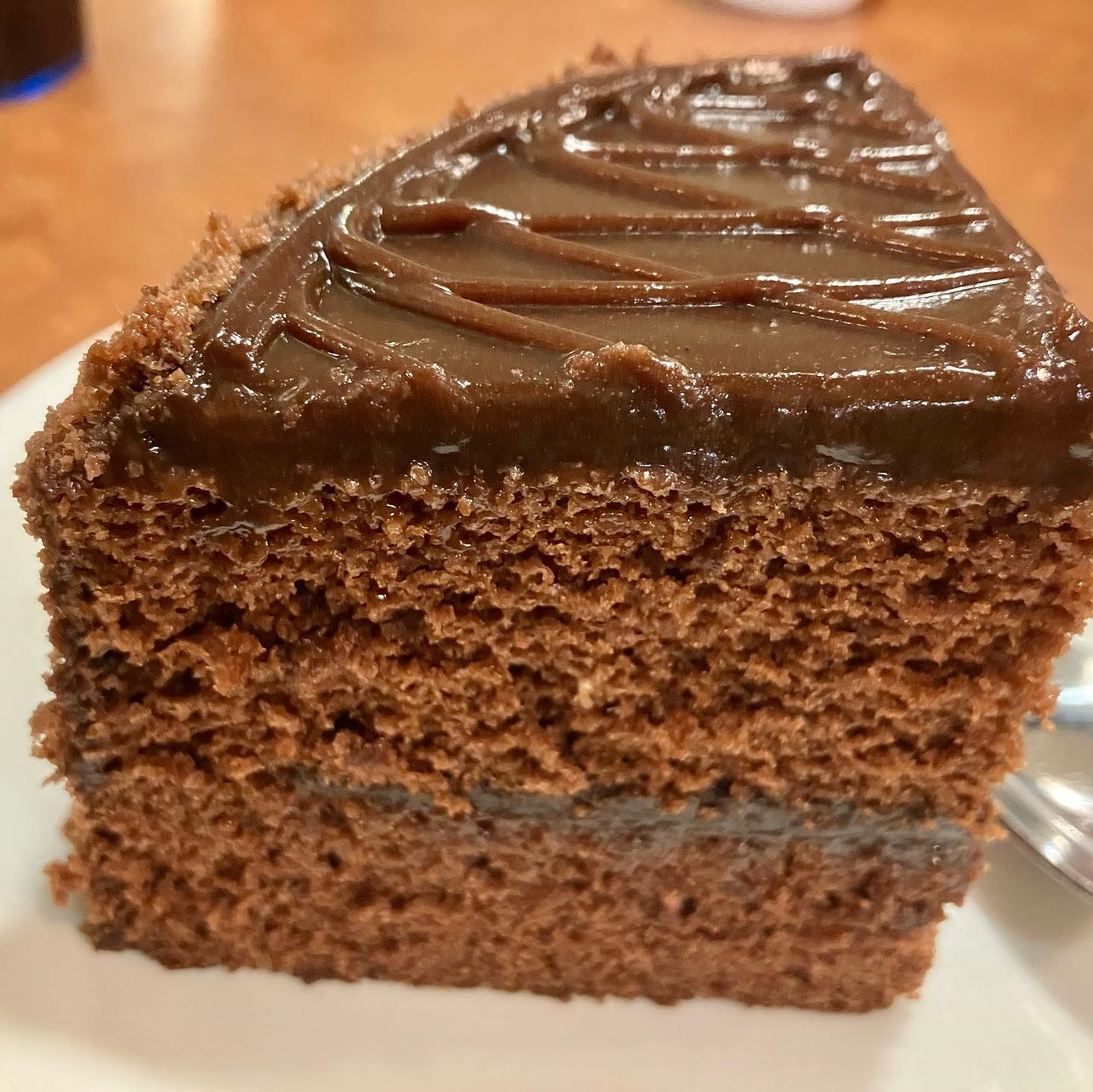
- Two-layered dobash cake
- Alternative names: Dobosh
- Type: Layer cake
- Course: Dessert
- Place of origin: United States
- Region or state: Hawaii
- Created by: Robert Taira
- Serving temperature: Cold
- Main ingredients: Chocolate cake, chiffon cake, chocolate pudding

Dobash cake (or Dobosh) is a layered chocolate cake filled and topped with a chocolate pudding-like frosting originating in Hawaii, adapted by local baker Robert Taira from the Hungarian Dobos torte. The cake is made of two to three layers of chocolate chiffon cake alternating with dessert pudding, sometimes dusted with crumbs.

== History ==
According to the Honolulu Advertiser, Robert Taira had discovered the Dobos torte on a trip to Europe. Taira, the original owner of the bakery and founder of King's Bakery, adapted a recipe and created this variation. Dobash cake is made with chiffon cake instead of genoise, and a frosting made of chocolate pudding instead of chocolate buttercream. In addition, Dobash has very few layers, typically under three layers instead of seven.

Many home recipes use devil's food cake, instant pudding, and lemon-lime soda in the cake mix, while the frosting is a cornstarch based pudding using cocoa powder.

== See also ==
- Dobos torte – Hungarian sponge cake
