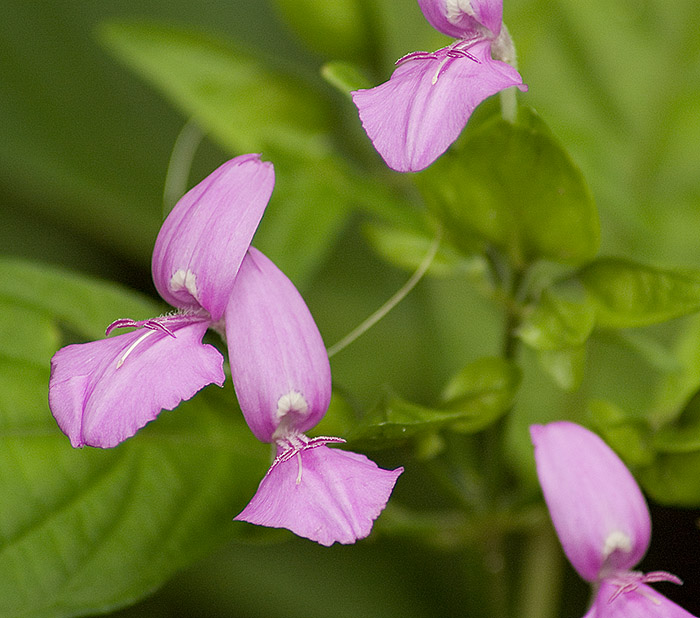

Scientific classification
- Kingdom: Plantae
- Clade: Tracheophytes
- Clade: Angiosperms
- Clade: Eudicots
- Clade: Asterids
- Order: Lamiales
- Family: Acanthaceae
- Subfamily: Acanthoideae
- Tribe: Justicieae
- Genus: Dicliptera
- Species: D. tinctoria

Binomial name
- Dicliptera tinctoria (Nees) Kostel.

Synonyms
- Adeloda integra Raf.; Dicliptera babui Karthik. & Moorthy; Dicliptera sivarajanii Karthik. & Moorthy; Justicia baphica Spreng.; Justicia bivalvis L.; Justicia purpurea Lour.; Justicia roxburghiana Schult.; Justicia tinctoria Roxb.; Peristrophe bivalvis (L.) Merr.; Peristrophe roxburghiana (Roem. & Schult.) Bremek.; Peristrophe tinctoria (Roxb.) Nees

= Dicliptera tinctoria =

Species of flowering plant

Dicliptera tinctoria is the accepted name of a species in the family Acanthaceae (previously described here as the synonyms Peristrophe bivalvis (L.) Merr. and P. roxburghiana). It may be called magenta plant, or lá cẩm in Vietnamese and native to southeastern Asia from Assam south to Sri Lanka and east to mainland Southeast Asia, Java, southern China, and Taiwan.

== Description ==
It is a herbaceous perennial plant growing to 0.3–1 m tall. The leaves are lanceolate to ovoid-acute, 20–75 mm long and 10–35 mm wide. The flowers are two-lobed, the long axis up to 50 mm long; they are magenta to reddish-violet.

== Cultivation and uses ==
=== Culinary use ===
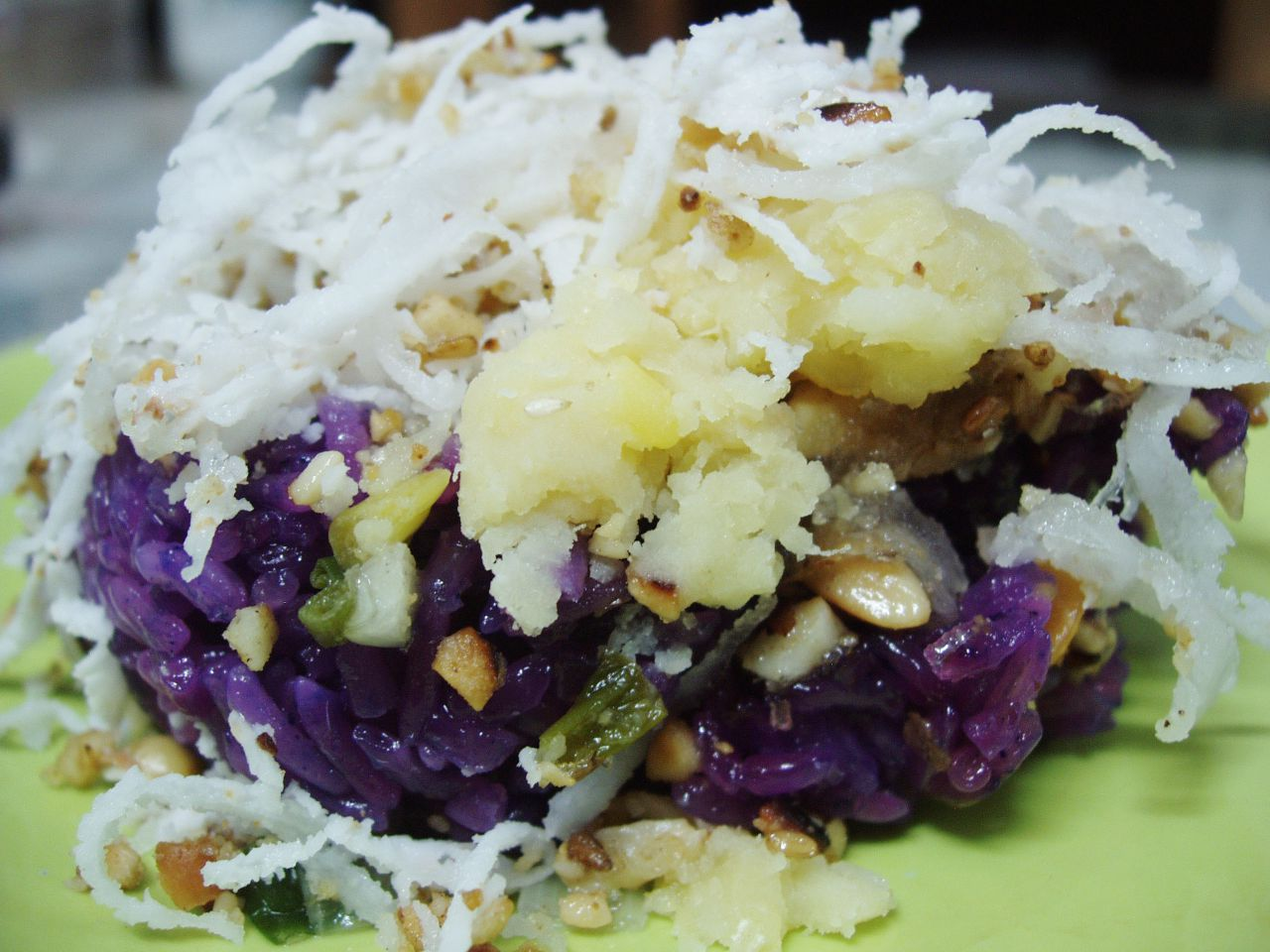
Xôi lá cẩm

An extract of its leaves is used as a food dye, and imparts a magenta tone to some Vietnamese foods, particularly in a taro-filled cake called bánh da lợn and glutinous rice dishes such as xôi lá cẩm, a sweet dessert.

=== Medicinal use ===
The plant is used in traditional Chinese medicine. The leaves have been used in water extract decoctions for the treatment of ailments including cough, dysentery, diarrhoea and bronchitis.

== Links ==
- Magenta plant page
- Chinese names
- Photo
- Photo
