= Doberge cake =

Layer cake from New Orleans

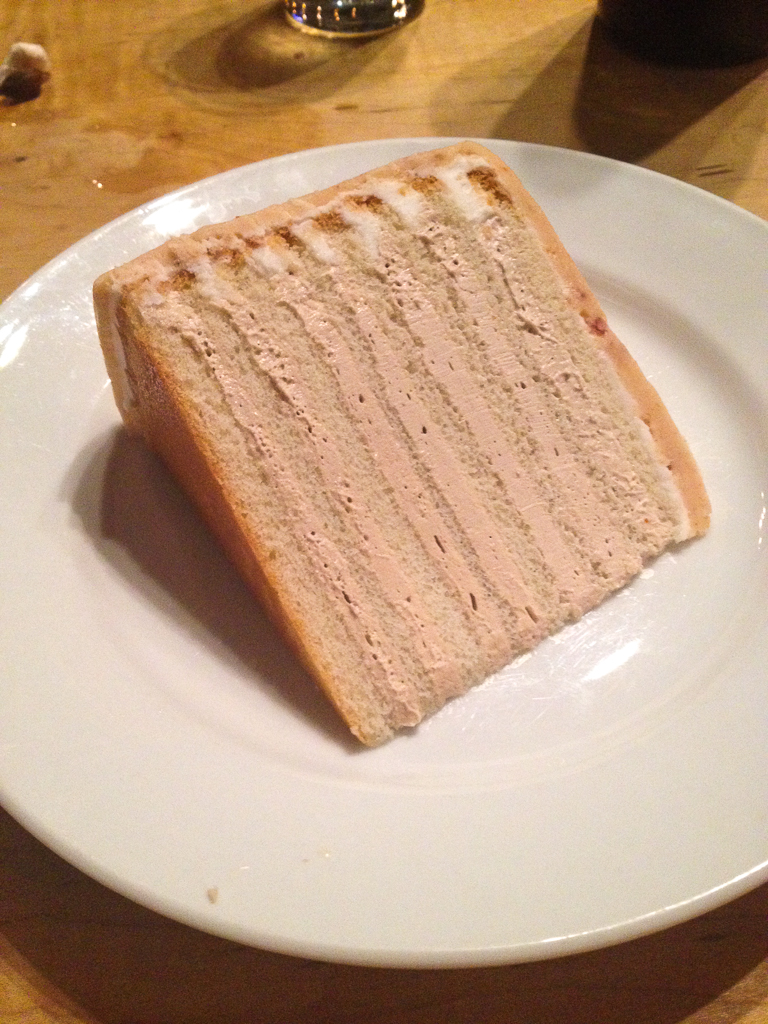
- Slice revealing the layers of a Doberge cake
- Type: Layer cake
- Course: Dessert
- Place of origin: United States
- Region or state: New Orleans, Louisiana
- Created by: Beulah Ledner
- Main ingredients: Cake, dessert pudding, butter cream

Doberge cake (often pronounced /ˈdoʊbæʃ/ DOH-bash) is a layered dessert originating in New Orleans, Louisiana, U.S., adapted by local baker Beulah Ledner from the Hungarian Dobos torte. Still popular in the area, the cake is made of multiple thin layers of cake alternating with dessert pudding. Very often the cakes are made with half chocolate pudding and half lemon pudding. They are covered in a thin layer of butter cream and a fondant shell or, alternatively, a poured glaze on the outside. They are normally made with six or more layers. Traditional flavors are chocolate, lemon or caramel.

== History ==
Beulah Levy Ledner, born into a Jewish family in St. Rose, Louisiana, opened a bakery in New Orleans in 1933. She became very successful after creating her "Doberge cake" adapted from the Hungarian/Austrian Dobos Cake, a cake made of nine génoise cake layers filled with buttercream and topped with a hard caramel glaze. The doberge cake is based on a recipe originating in Alsace-Lorraine. Ledner replaced the buttercream filling of the Dobos Cake with a custard filling and iced the cakes with buttercream and a thin layer of fondant.

Beulah Ledner's recipe is available in the cookbook, Let's bake with Beulah Ledner: A legendary New Orleans Lady by Maxine Wolchansky.

In 1946 Joe Gambino bought the name, recipe and retail shop, including her recipe for doberge cake and a promise that she would not reopen in New Orleans for five years. After a couple of years of illness, she reopened in a new location on Metairie Road in the New Orleans suburb of Metairie under the name "Beulah Ledner, Inc." As her business and popularity grew, her son, Albert, designed and built a new building and a new machine to mass-produce sheet cakes using his mother's recipes. She opened her new bakery on May 21, 1970; she ran it until she retired in 1981 at the age of 87, when she sold the shop and doberge recipe to Maurice's French Pastries, which was still in the business of baking and selling doberge cakes in Metairie as of early 2022.

== See also ==
- List of cakes
