= Bánh da lợn =

Steamed layer cake from Vietnam

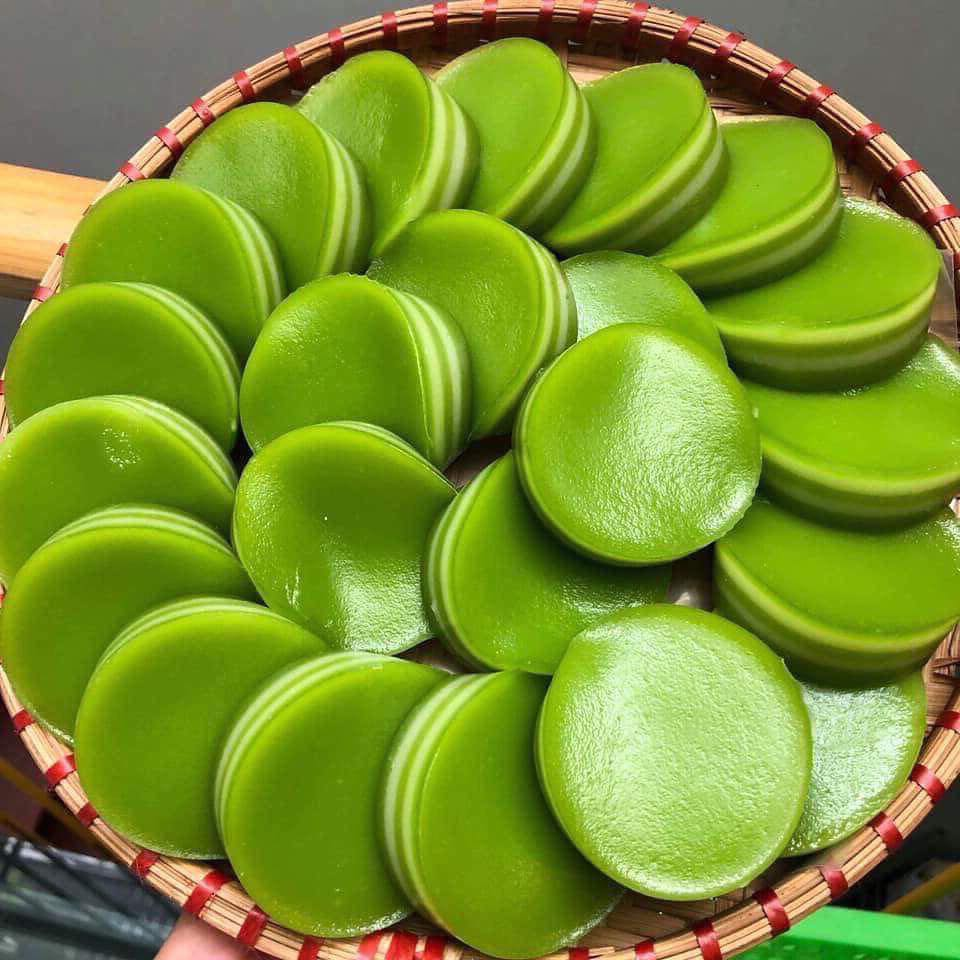
- Bánh da lợn lá dứa green leaf cake with pandan leaves flavor
- Type: Layer cake
- Course: Snack, dessert
- Place of origin: South Vietnam
- Region or state: Southeast Asia
- Main ingredients: Rice flour, tapioca starch, mung beans, taro or durian, coconut milk or water, sugar
- Similar dishes: Kuih lapis, Kutsinta

Bánh da lợn (or bánh da lợp, bánh da lợt) is a Vietnamese steamed layer cake, mostly popular in Southern Vietnam, made from tapioca starch, rice flour, mashed mung beans, taro, or durian, coconut milk and/or water, and sugar. Despite its name, pork is not included in the ingredients. It is sweet and gelatinously soft in texture, with thin (approximately 1 cm) colored layers alternating with layers of mung bean, durian, or taro filling. A similar type of cake in Northern Vietnam is bánh chín tầng mây (lit. 'nine-layer cloud cake').

Typical versions of bánh da lợn may feature the following ingredients:

- Pandan leaf (for green color) with mung bean paste filling
- Pandan leaf (for green color) with durian filling
- Lá cẩm (leaf of the magenta plant, Dicliptera tinctoria; imparts a purple color when boiled) with mashed taro filling

In modern cooking, artificial food coloring is sometimes used in place of the vegetable coloring.

Kuih lapis, which is made in Malaysia and Indonesia, as well as the Thai khanom chan, are similar to bánh da lợn. In the Philippines, a similar dessert and variant of kutsinta is simply called Vietnamese kutsinta and the Khmer of Cambodia call it num chak chan (នំចាក់ចាន់).

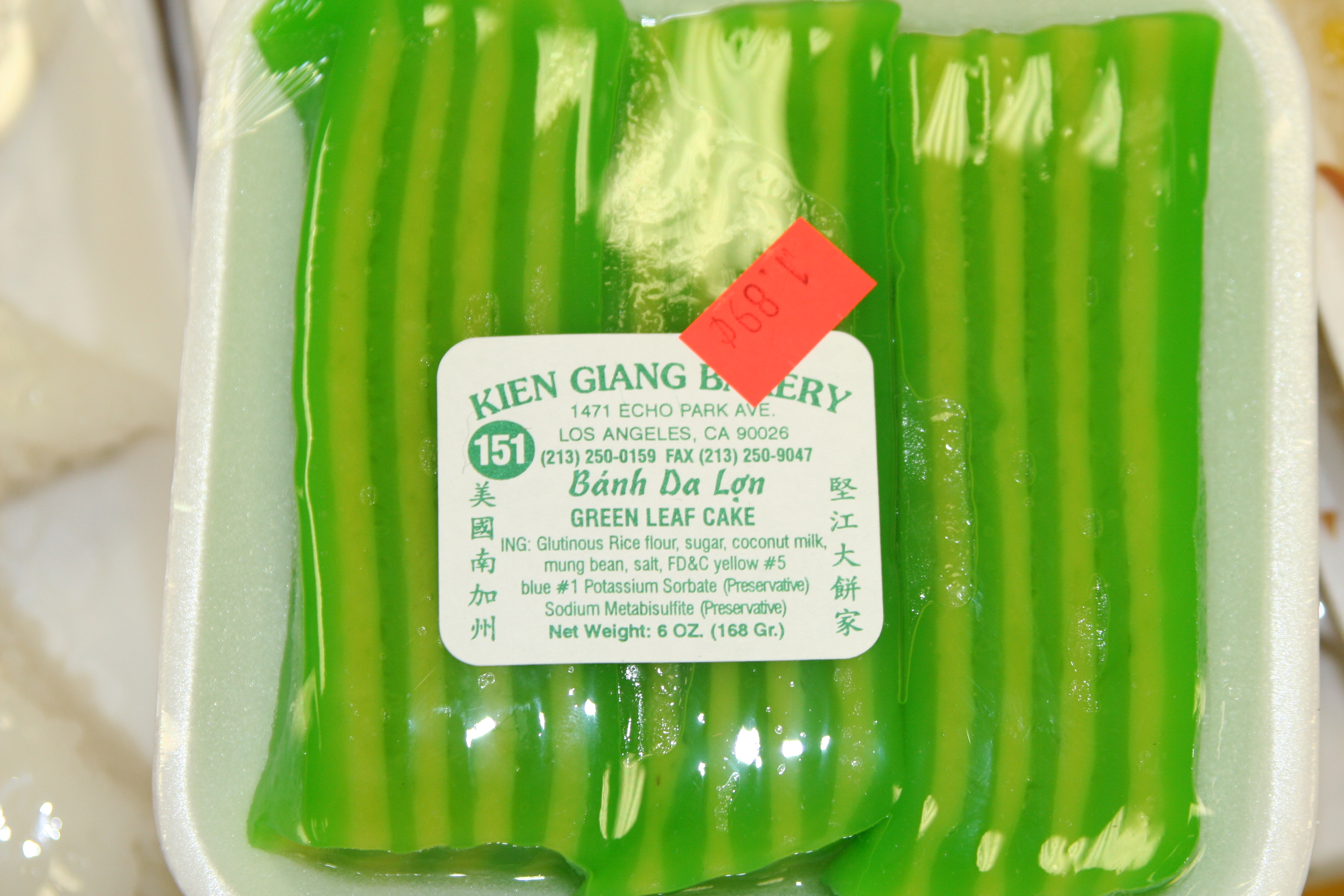
Bánh da lợn green leaf cake

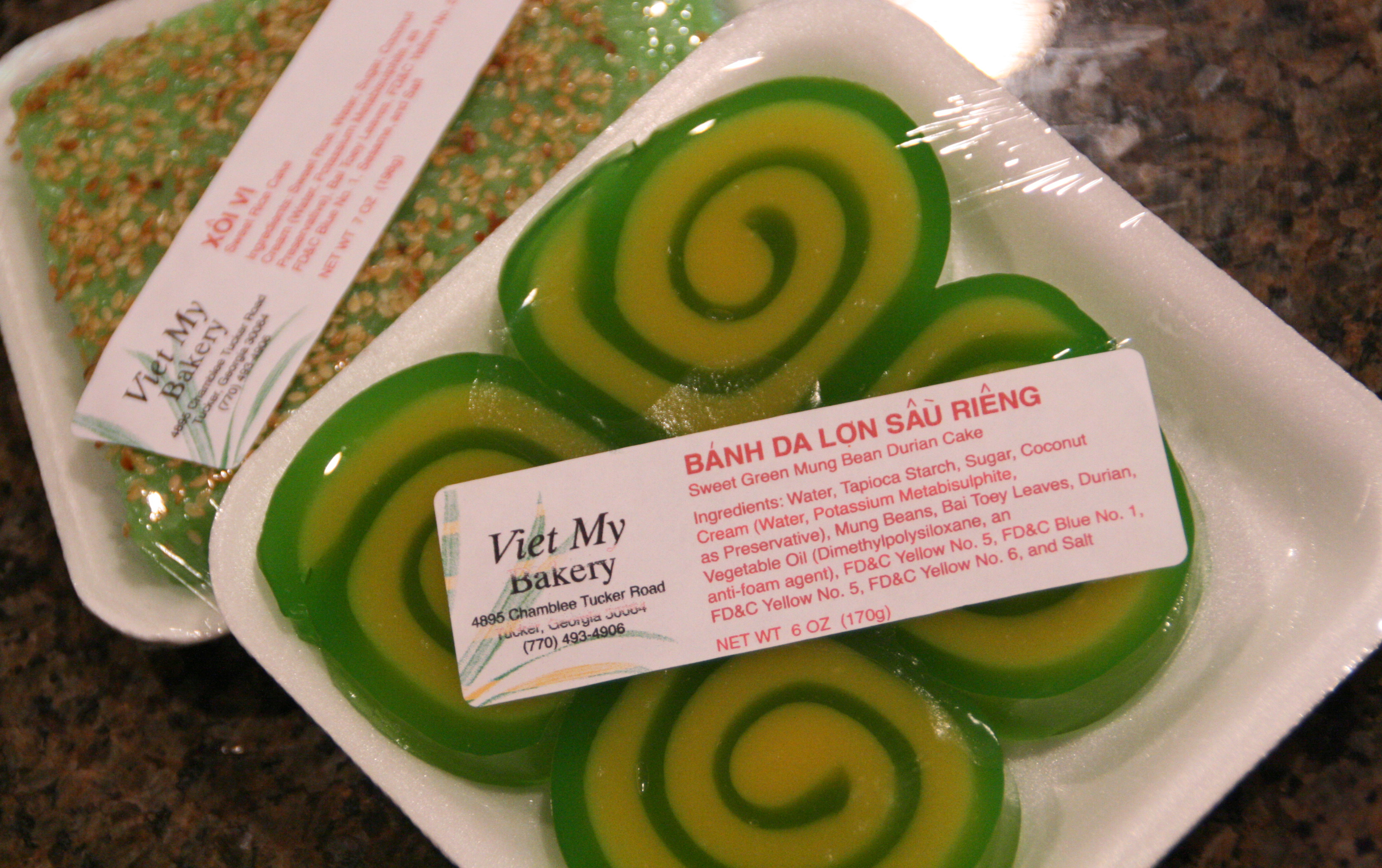
Bánh da lợn green leaf cake with durian flavor

== See also ==
- Pandan cake
- Bánh đúc
- Kutsinta
- List of steamed foods
