= Layer cake =

Cake made from stacked layers of cake held together by filling

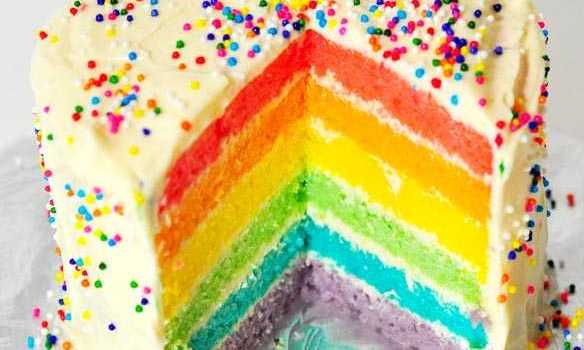
- Rainbow layer cake
- Type: Cake
- Course: Dessert
- Main ingredients: Cake base (e.g. - sponge cake or butter cake), icing, jam or other filling

A layer cake (US English) or sandwich cake (UK English) is a cake consisting of multiple stacked sheets of cake, held together by a filling such as frosting, jam, or other preserves. Most cake recipes can be adapted for layer cakes; butter cakes and sponge cakes are common choices. Frequently, the cake is covered with icing, but sometimes, the sides are left undecorated, so that the filling and the number of layers are visible. Popular flavor combinations include German chocolate cake, red velvet cake, Black Forest cake, and carrot cake with cream cheese icing. Many wedding cakes are decorated layer cakes.

In the mid-19th century, modern cakes were first described in English. Maria Parloa's Appledore Cook Book, published in Boston in 1872, contained one of the first layer cake recipes. Another early recipe for layer cake was published in Cassell's New Universal Cookery Book, published in London in 1894.

== Older forms ==
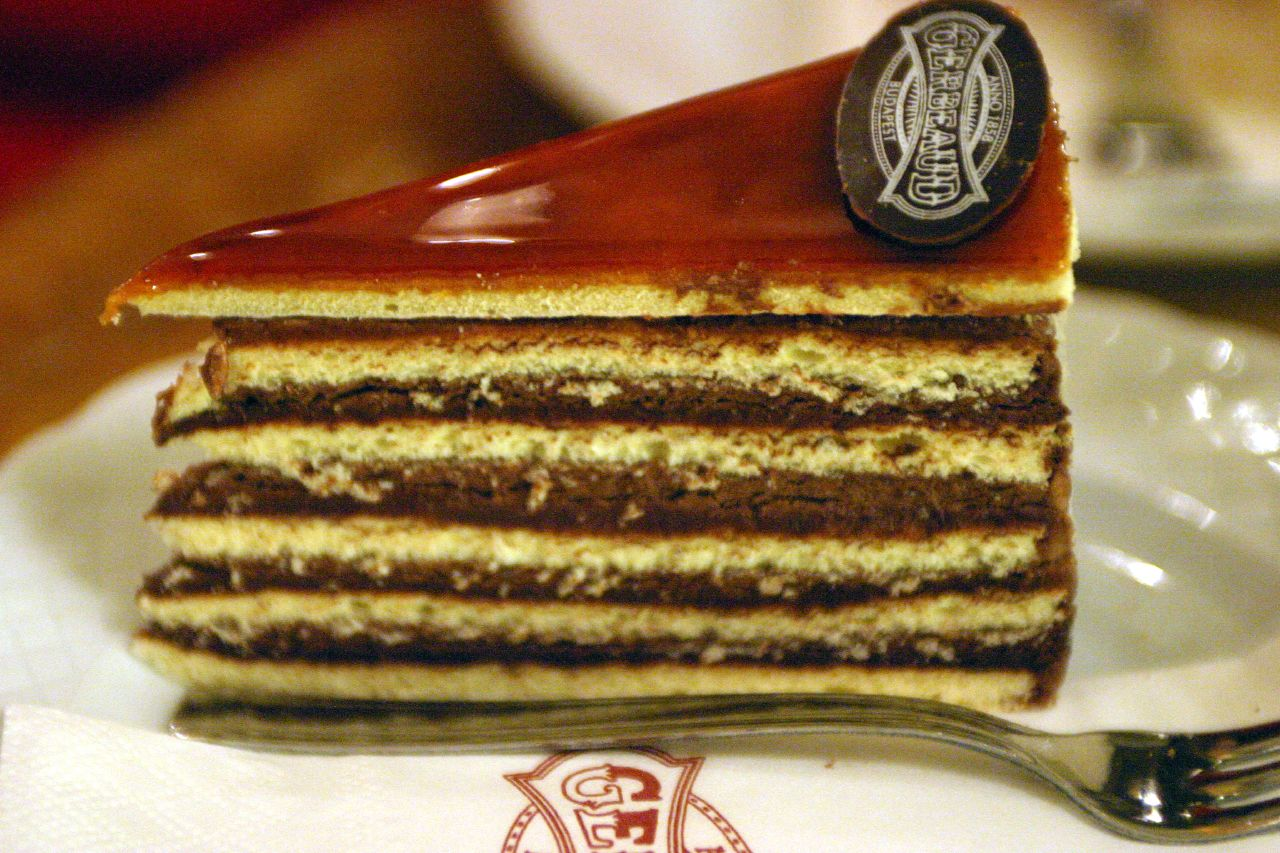
For a Dobos torte, all cake layers are baked separately.

Whereas in modern layer cakes, layers are generally baked to a height of around 2 inches (5.1 cm) and split horizontally, another method of preparing cake layers is used for cakes like Dobos torte and Prinzregententorte: The cake batter is baked in seven or eight separate thin layers, about a half-inch thick each in the finished stack. These layers are then covered with a thin layer of cream and/or jam and stacked. This stack, which is the same height as the typical Western layer cake, is then frosted so that the structure is not visible. At first glance, these cakes look much like a German konditorei style cake such as the Black Forest cake.

An example for a European layer cake invented in 1735 is the Frankfurter Kranz (Frankfurt Crown Cake) which consists of two or three layers of sponge cake filled with jam and buttercream frosting, and then frosted with more buttercream.

The French term gâteau is used for a cake in France, and in the UK it means a layer cake. It is also used for some types of pastry-based desserts like the Gâteau Basque.

== Comparison ==
Layer cakes typically serve multiple people, so they are larger than cupcakes, petits fours, or other individual pastries. A common layer cake size, which is baked in nine-inch round cake pans, typically serves about 16 people, but there is some variation. Some recipes suggest larger pieces with as few as 10 servings for a double-layer cake, and others expect 24 servings. Much smaller pieces, with as many as 32 servings for a nine-inch round layer cake, are common for wedding cake.

Unlike the Vietnamese Bánh da lợn or Swiss rolls, layer cake is assembled from several separate pieces of cake. A sheet cake can become a layer cake if it is cut into pieces and reassembled with frosting or other filling to form layers.

Various styles of layer cakes

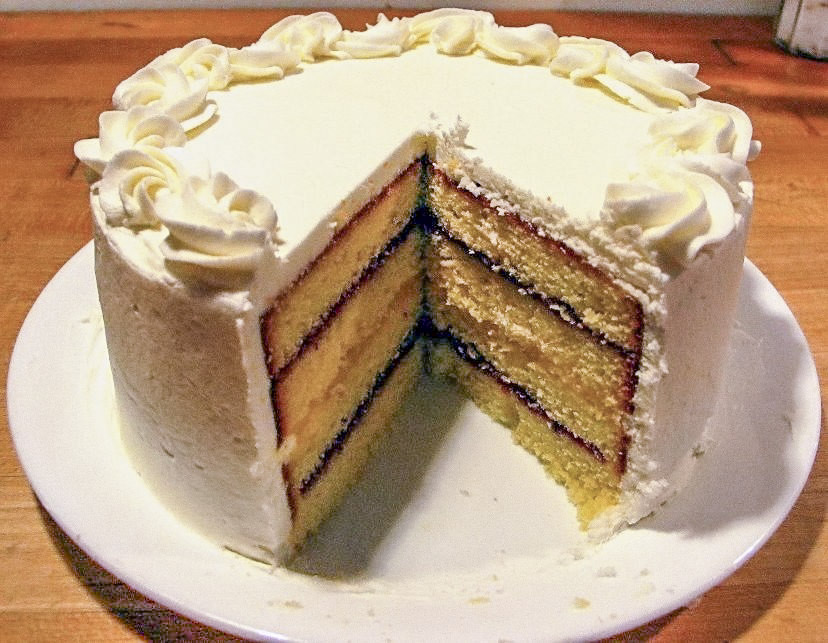
Pound cake with jam and cream filling

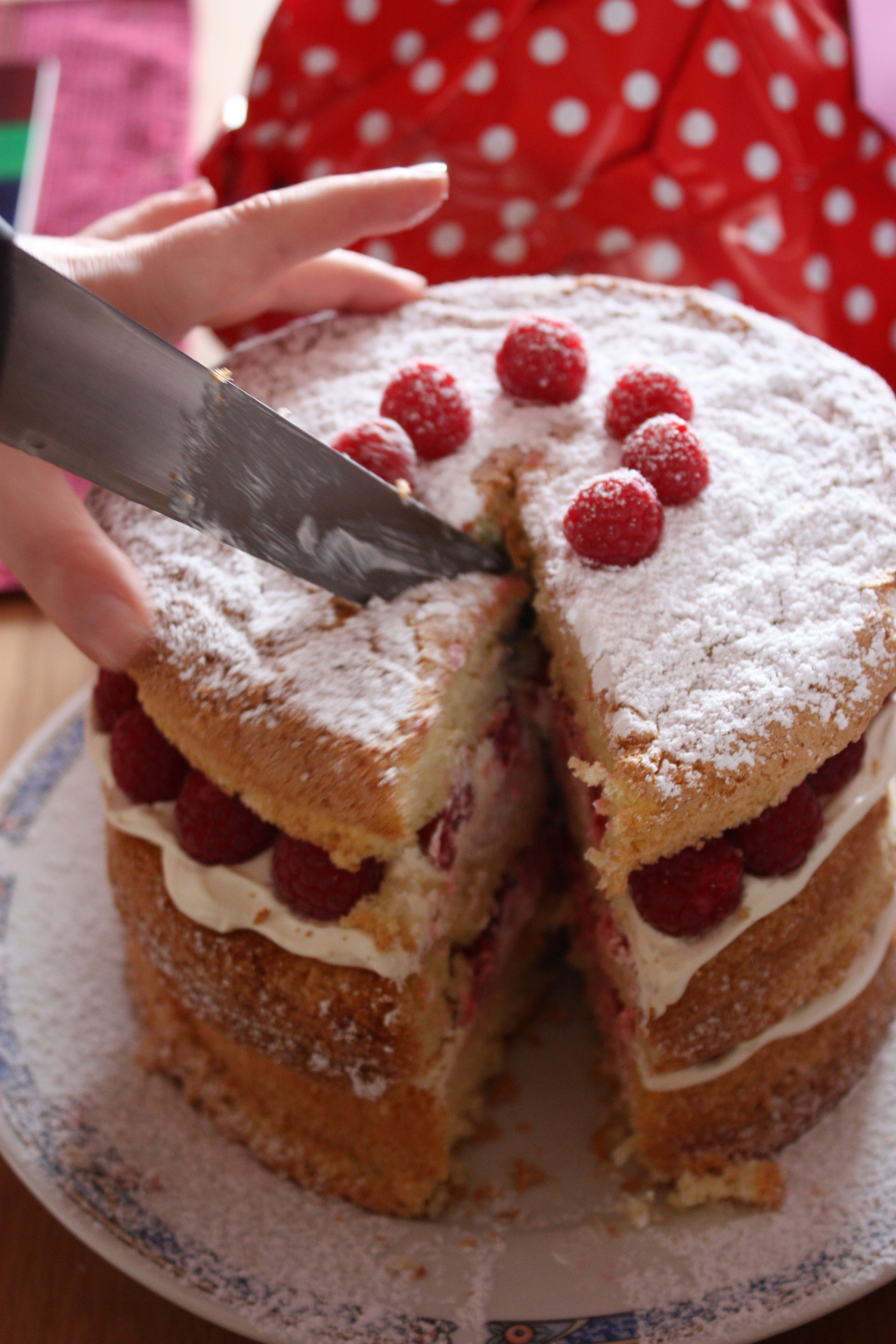
Layer cake without icing

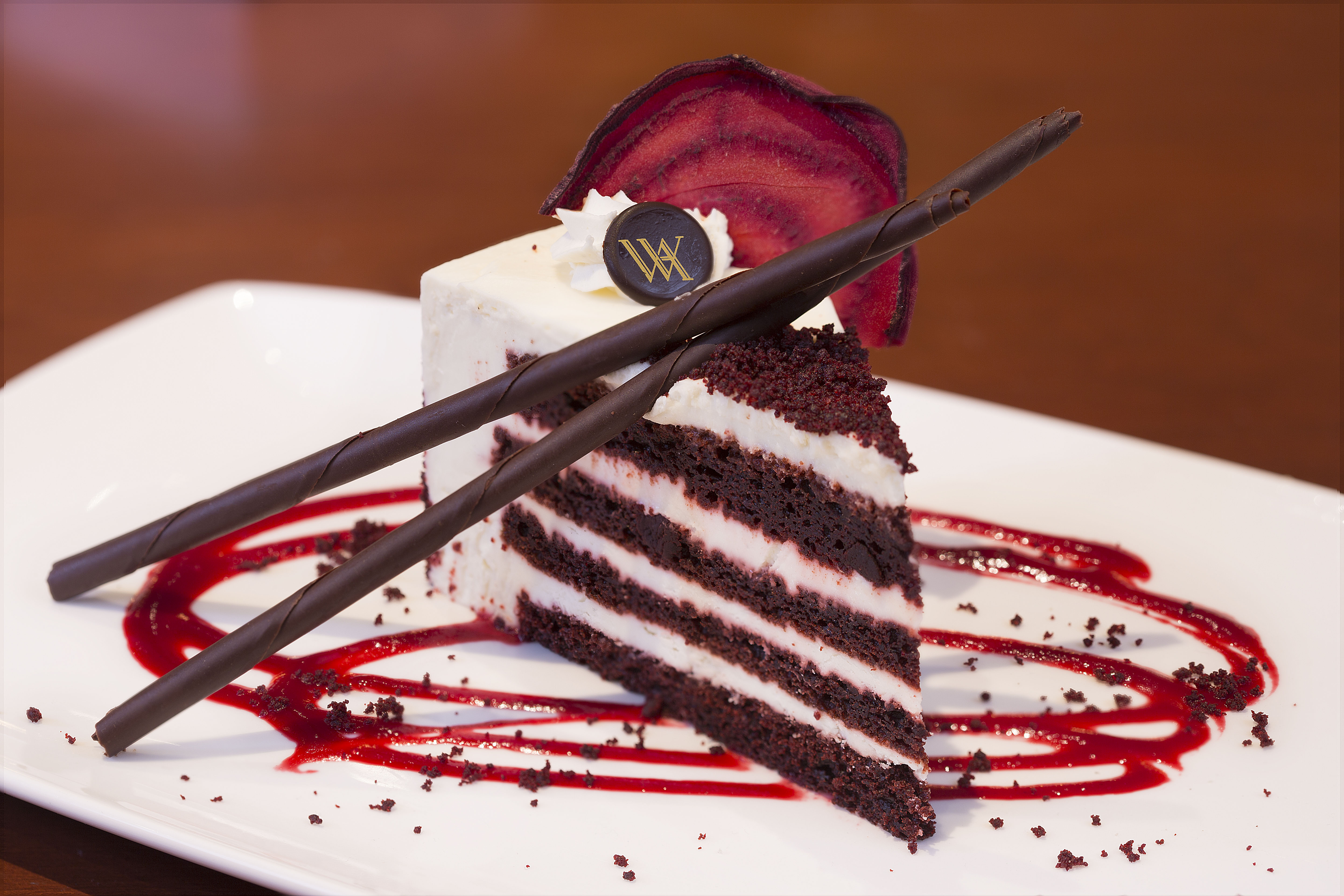
Red velvet cake with cream cheese frosting

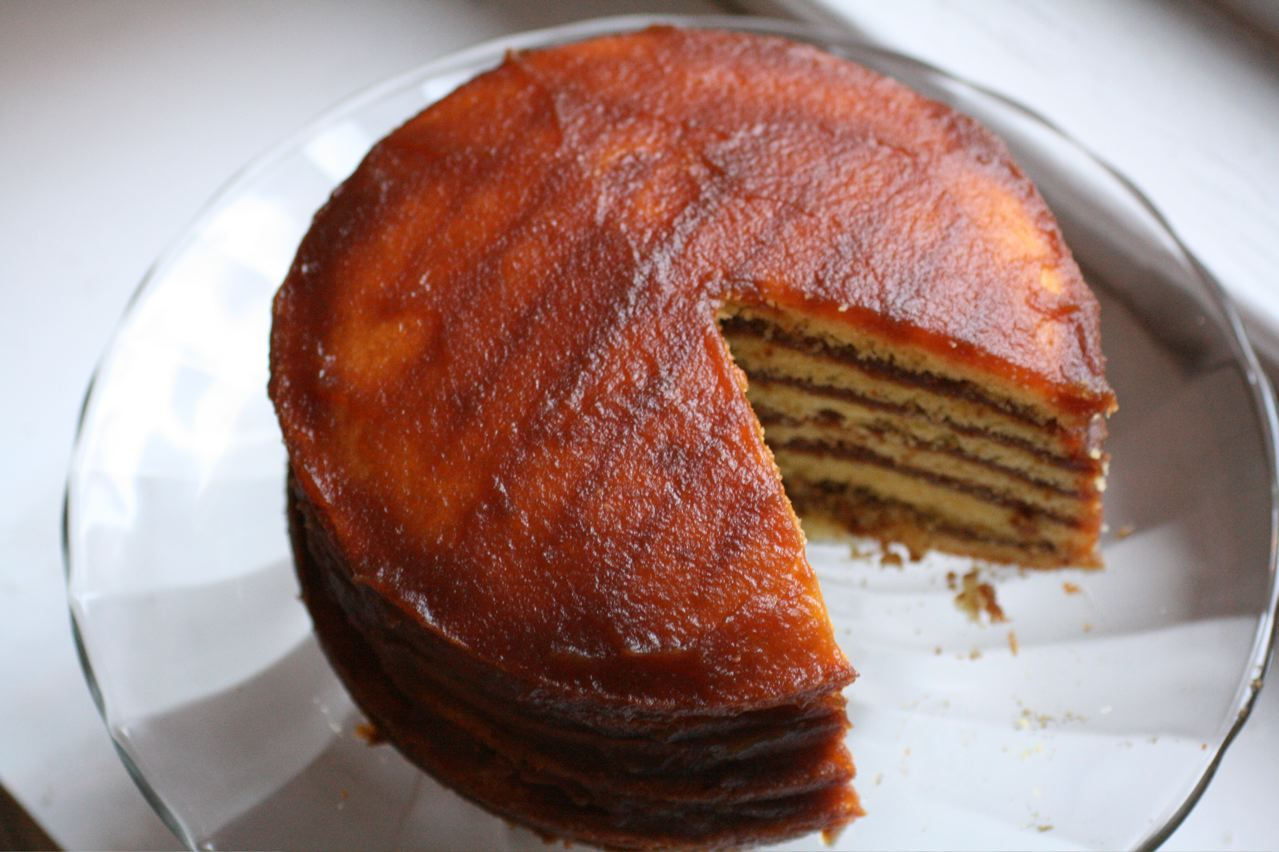
Apple preserves instead of icing

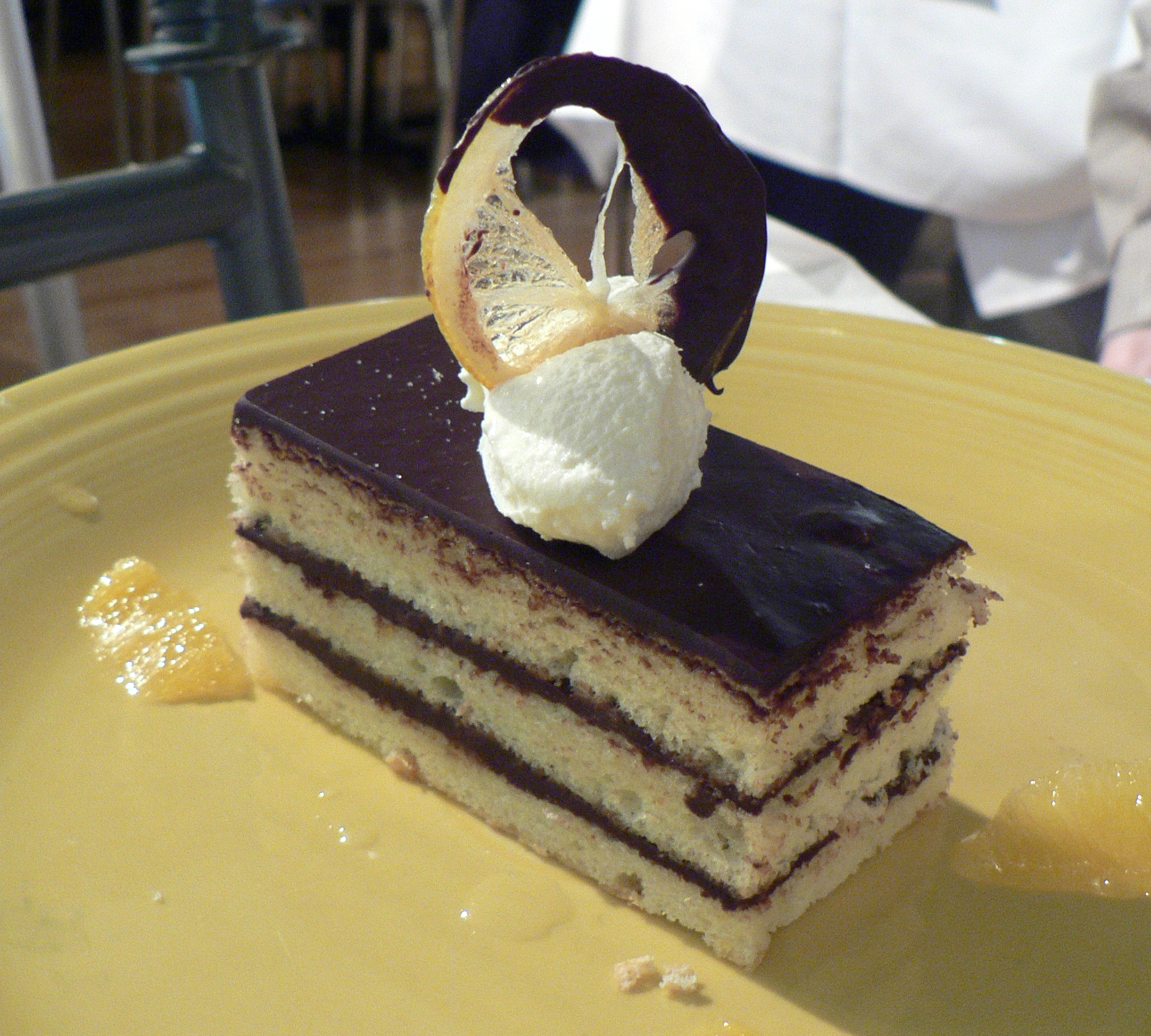
Square piece of layer cake

== Examples ==
- Funfetti, a vanilla flavoured cake with rainbow sprinkles throughout
- Black Forest gateau, a chocolate layer cake filled with whipped cream and cherries
- Blackout cake, a chocolate layer cake named after the wartime blackouts
- Boston cream pie, which, despite the name, is a yellow layer cake filled with pastry cream and topped with chocolate frosting
- Buckwheat gateau from northern Germany
- Doberge cake, a New Orleans version of the Hungarian Dobos torte
- German chocolate cake, an American cake usually baked as a layer cake
- Hummingbird cake, an American spice cake often baked as a layer cake
- Lane cake, from the Southern United States
- Medovik, honey-flavored cake with many layers
- Sarawak layer cake from Malaysia
- Lapis legit (Spekkoek) from Indonesia
- Stack cake from the United States
- Washington pie, a jam-filled cake from the United States

== See also ==
- Baumkuchen
- Cake mixing techniques
- List of cakes
- Mille crêpes
- Mille-feuille
- Torte
- Vínarterta
