= Lapis legit =

Indonesian layered cake

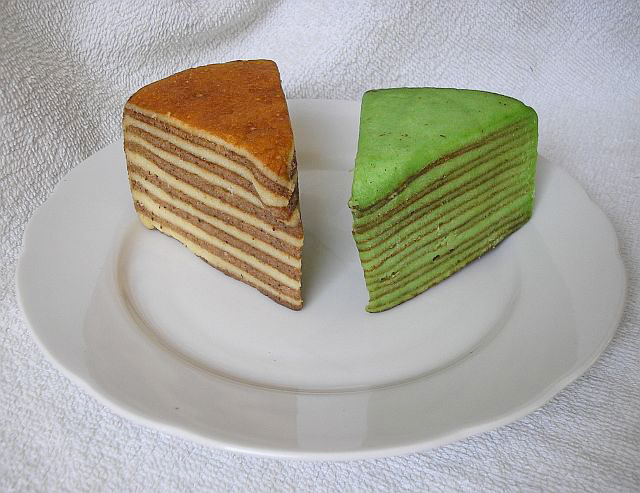
- Lapis legit, plain and with pandan
- Alternative names: Spekkoek, spekuk, spiku, kek lapis, kueh lapis
- Type: Cake
- Place of origin: Dutch East Indies (modern-day Indonesia)
- Region or state: Batavia
- Associated cuisine: Indonesia, Netherlands
- Main ingredients: Flour, egg yolks, butter, sugar, cinnamon, clove, mace and anise

Lapis legit, also known as spekkoek (Dutch: [ˈspɛkuk]; Indonesian: kue lapis legit or spekuk), and kueh lapis in Singapore, is a type of Indonesian layer cake. It was developed during colonial times in the Dutch East Indies. The firm-textured cake is a Dutch-Indonesian version of kue lapis, the multi-layered steamed rice cake common in Southeast Asia, but using Dutch ingredients like flour and butter. It contains a mix of Indonesian spices, such as cardamom, cinnamon, clove, mace and anise. The cake is made of flour and yolk and is rich in butter or margarine.

Lapis legit is popular in Indonesia and is served as a holiday treat, especially for natal (Christmas), imlek (Chinese New Year), and lebaran (the Islam holidays of Eid al-Fitr and Eid al-Adha). It is also served or given as gifts during many local festivities such as at birthday parties and weddings. In the Netherlands, the sliced cake can be found in most grocery stores and Asian markets (tokos). It is traditionally served for dessert in rijsttafel. It is also a well-known dessert in Hadhramout.

== Etymology ==
The Dutch term spekkoek translates literally as 'bacon cake', a name derived from its appearance of dark and light layers. Its Indonesian name, lapis legit, means 'dense layer cake'. In English, the cake is occasionally called "thousand layer cake", although the cake is unrelated to the French mille feuille (lit. thousand sheets), which is made with puff pastry.

== Origin ==
Lapis legit is thought to have been made by the wives of Dutch administrators in Batavia (modern-day Jakarta) during the colonial period and served during evening tea.

== Preparation ==
As a lapis legit commonly has more than 18 layers, baking this cake requires patience and is a very labour-intensive process. The batter is mainly made of butter, flour and sugar with an approximate ratio of 1:1:2. Each layer is made by pouring a small amount of batter into a baking tin, which is then put into an oven and grilled from above until the layer has turned golden from the heat. The tin is then removed from the oven, and this process is repeated to build up the remaining layers. Dutch ovens with a charcoal fire on top of the lid are said to produce the best results, while electric ovens are superior to gas ovens as cakes bake much faster in the former.

Where clove buds or cardamom seeds are difficult to find, bakers can use lapis legit powder as a replacement. Milling and mixing the spices right before baking produces a cake with an excellent aroma. The ground spices must be sieved into the flour at least three times, as the spice powder is very fine and tends to clump in the batter. In Indonesia, there are many varieties of lapis legit, including cakes containing almonds, cashew nuts, cheese, prunes or raisins, and even cakes flavoured with chocolate and pandan.

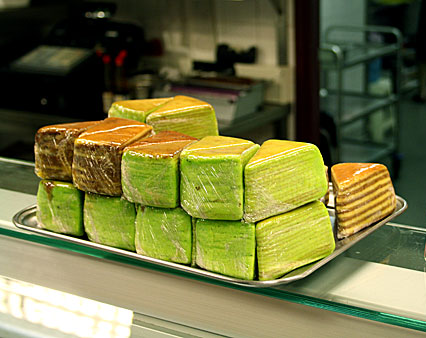
Lapis legit on sale in an Indo (Eurasian) shop in Amsterdam, Netherlands

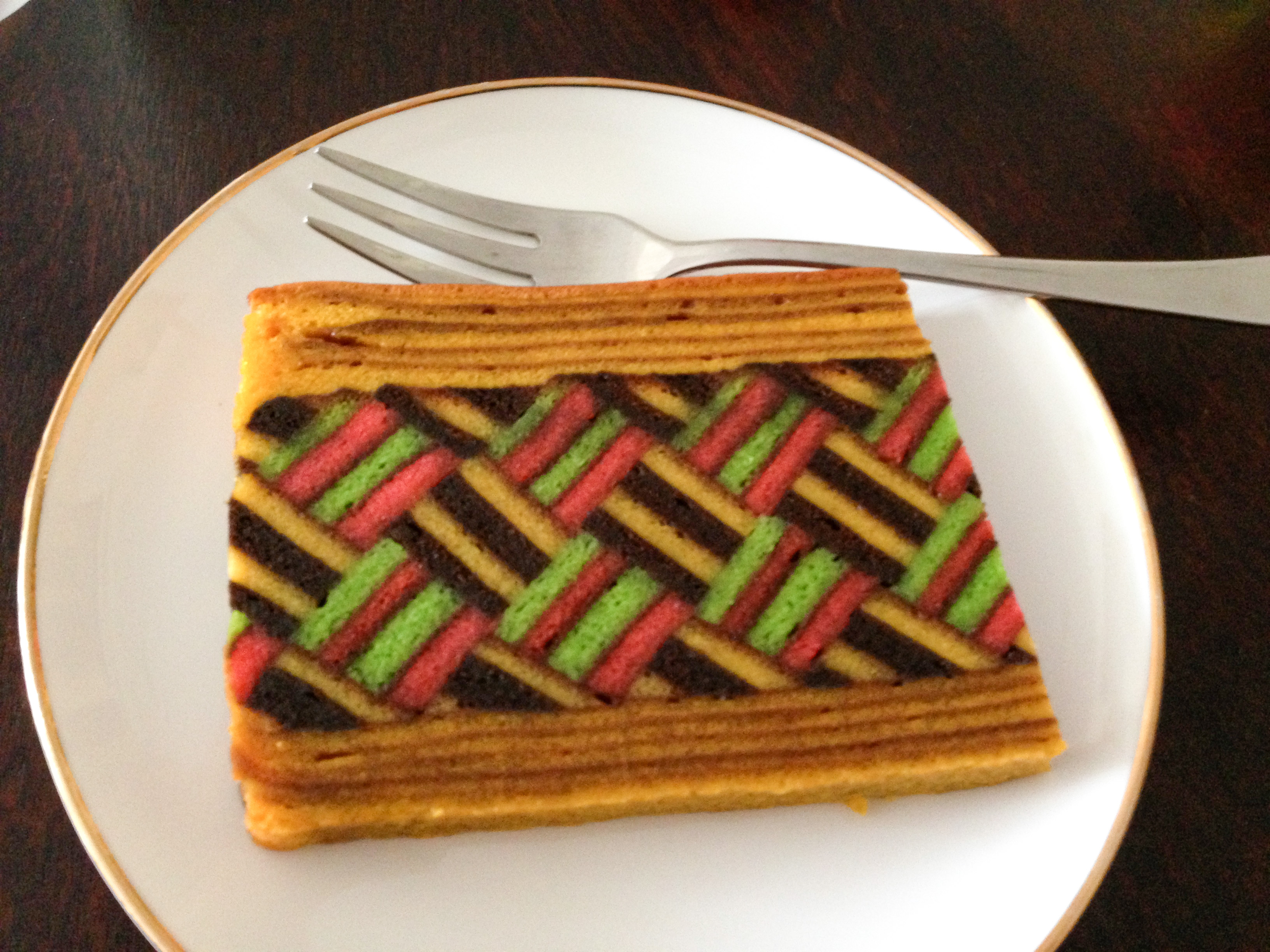
A festive Indonesian kue lapis legit in Singapore

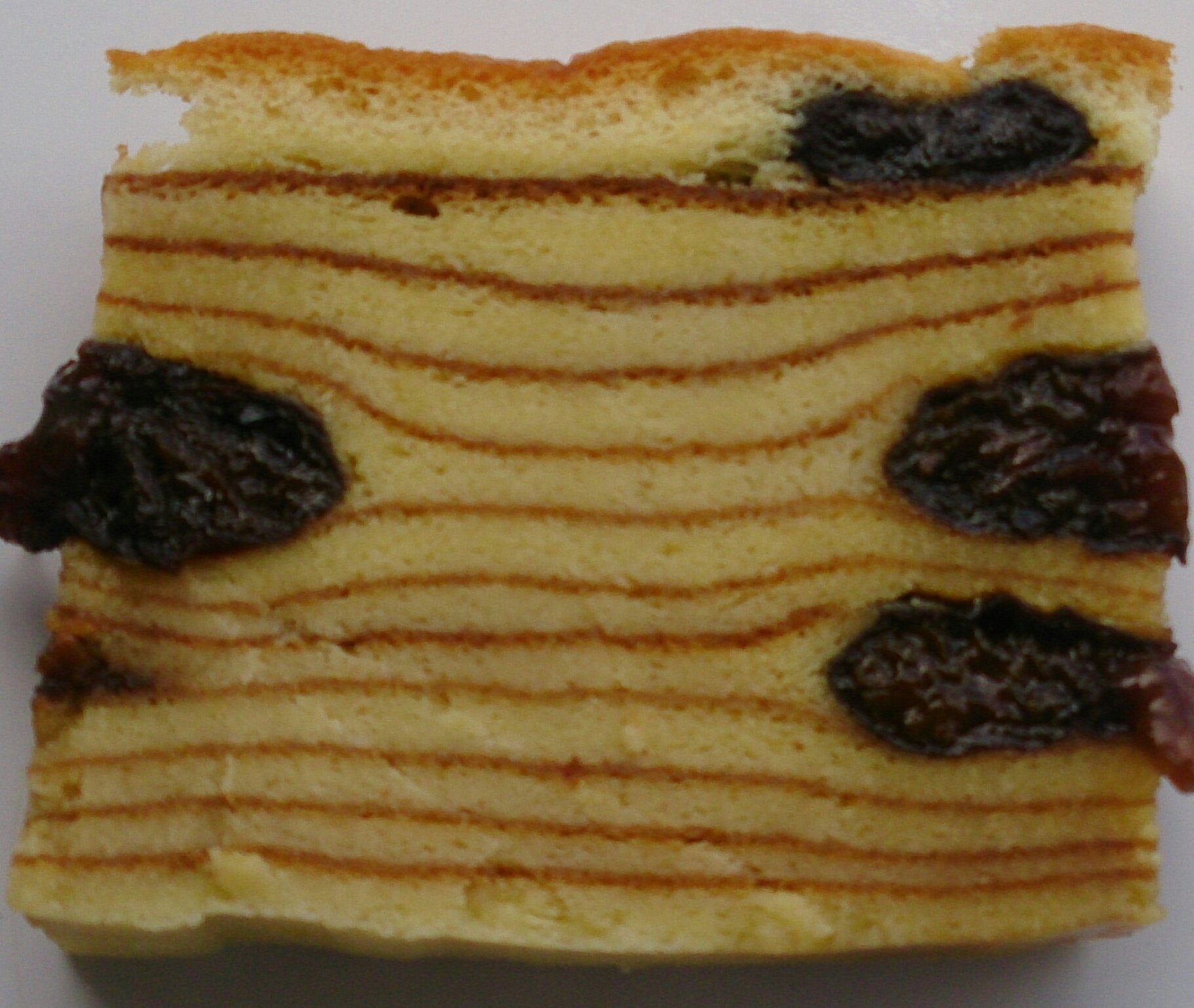
Kue lapis legit with prunes

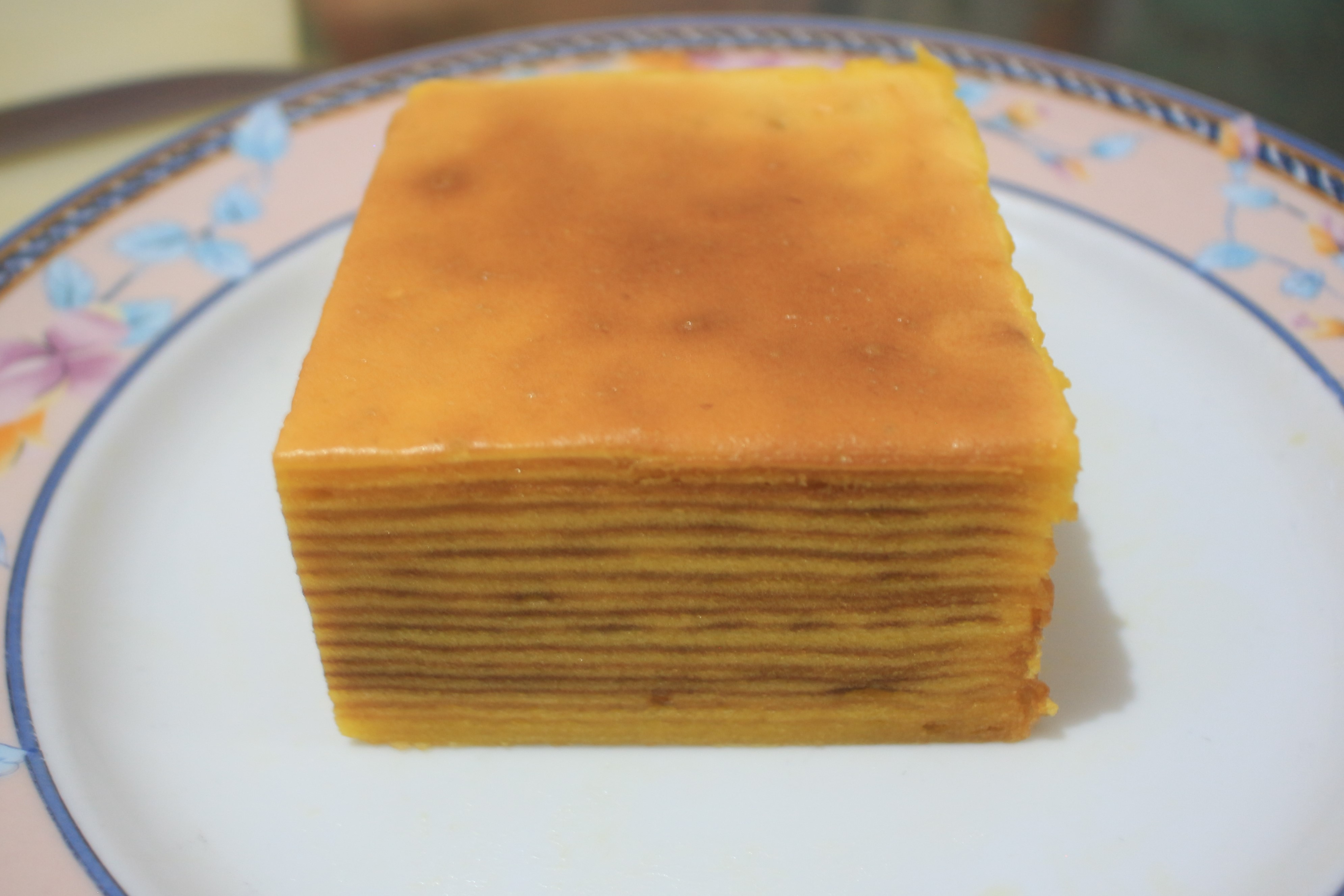
Pontianak-style lapis legit

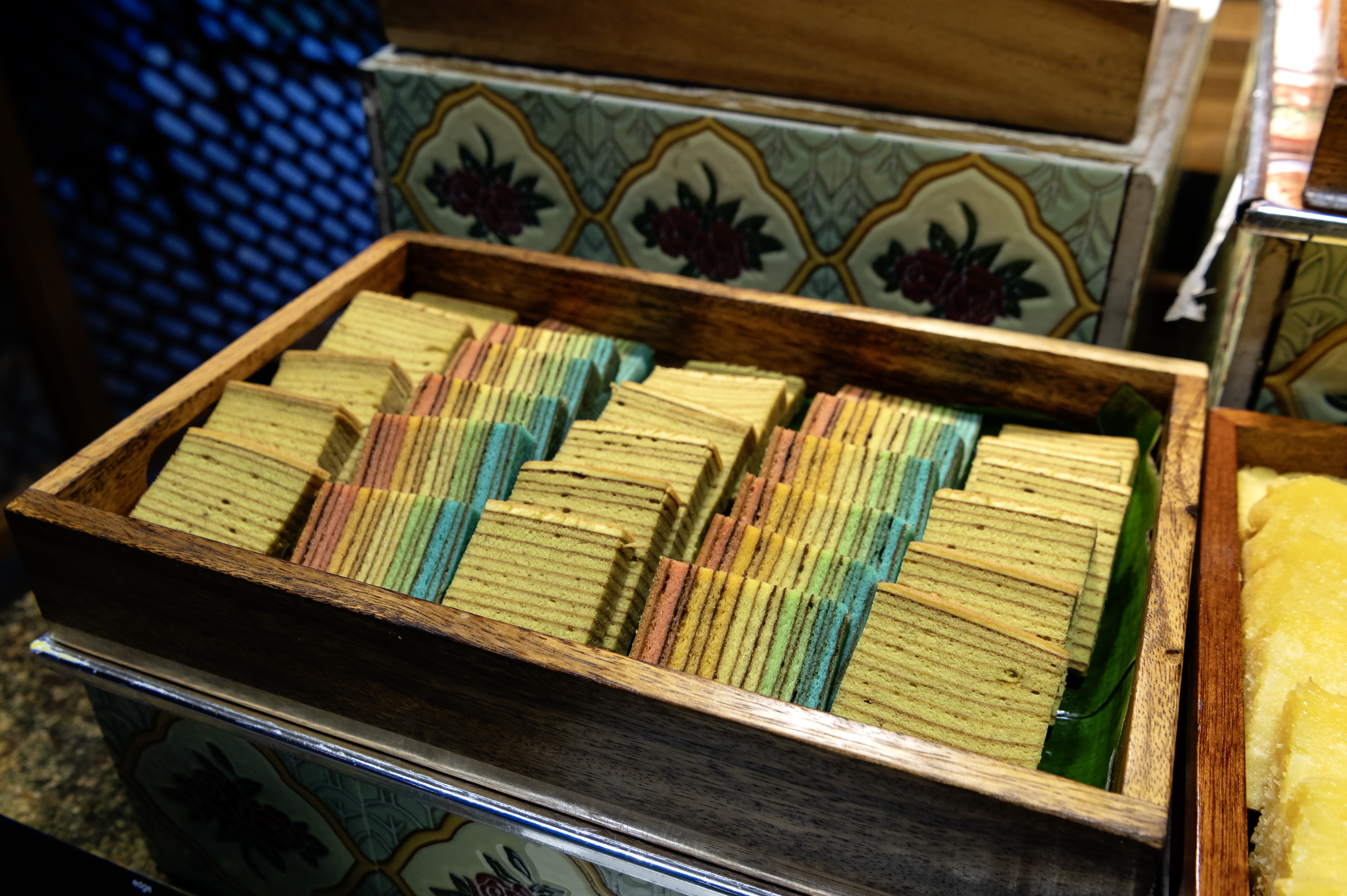
Rainbow Kue Lapis Legit

== Market ==
Generally, a typical lapis legit cake is sold in a square pan called a loyang, measuring approximately 20x20x6 cm with the full cake weighing around 1.2 kg, although half and quarter cakes are also commonly available.

Due to the effort required to bake the cake, it is a rather expensive delicacy, costing about €20 per kilogram in 2010 in the Netherlands. In 2018, a high-quality cake from a well-known retailer in Jakarta cost 950,000 Indonesian rupiah (US$70) each, while in Singapore, cakes from Bengawan Solo retailed for 80 Singapore dollars (US$61) in 2025.

== Similar cakes ==
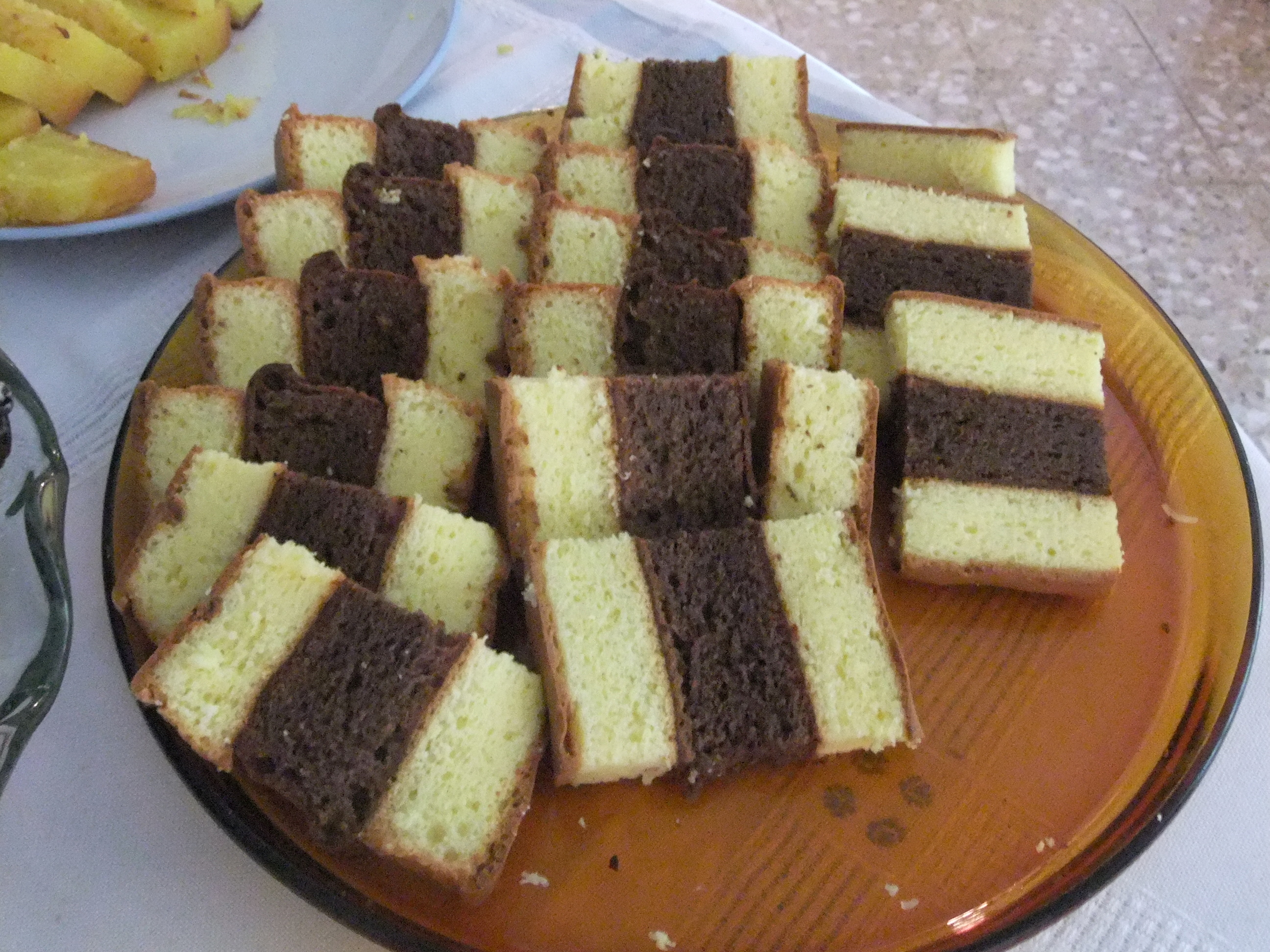
Kue lapis Surabaya

In Malang, East Java, kue lapis malang or spiku malang refers to a two-layered cake prepared using a different technique. Two batter mixes are prepared, one with naturally produced yellow colour, the other mixed with cocoa powder to produce a dark brown colour. The batter mixes are poured into two different baking tins and baked in the oven. To assemble of the cake are layered on top of each other with a thin layer of fruit jam in between. Similarly in Surabaya, kue lapis surabaya or spiku surabaya refers to a three-layered cake, prepared using a similar technique to spiku malang. The kue lapis surabaya is commonly used to make a birthday cake and wedding cake in Indonesia.

Lapis legit is similar to traditional Indonesian kue lapis, the difference being that lapis legit is a puffy layered cake, made of flour and is baked, while kue lapis is a moist layered pudding, made of rice flour and sago, and is steamed. In Singapore, lapis legit may also be called kueh lapis.

Lapis legit has also spread to Malaysia. A form developed in Sarawak is called the Sarawak layer cake or kek lapis Sarawak which has greater colour and flavour variations.

== See also ==
- De Bazel, a building in Amsterdam nicknamed "De Spekkoek"
- Dobos torte, a similar Hungarian cake
- Kek lapis Sarawak, a similar Malaysian cake influenced by lapis legit
- Kue lapis
- Bebinca
- Baumkuchen
- List of cakes
- Kue
