= Kue lapis =

Southeast Asian layered cake

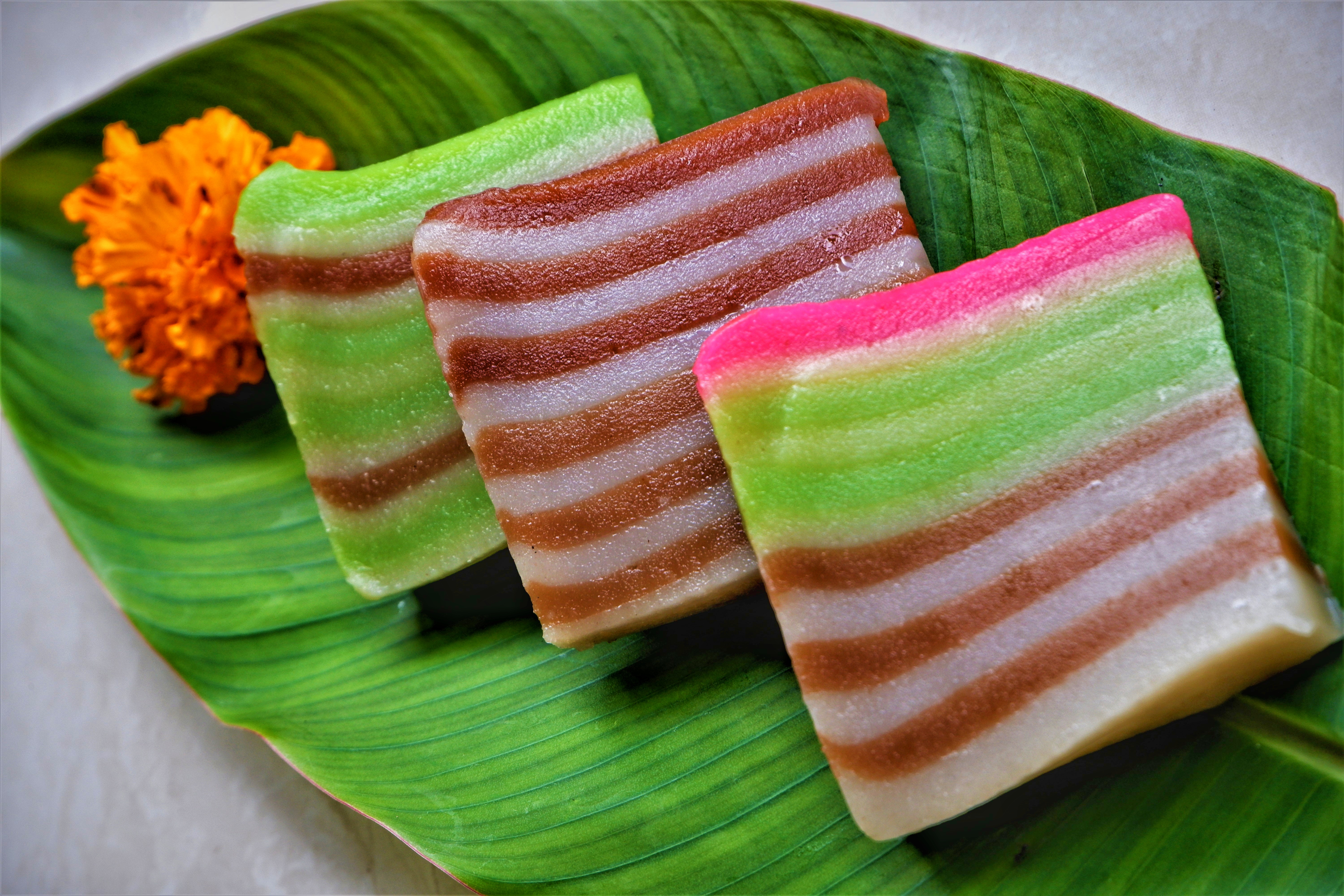
- Three slices of kue lapis in different colors
- Alternative names: Kuih lapis Kueh lapis Kue pepe Kueh genggang
- Type: Kue/Kuih
- Course: Dessert
- Place of origin: Southeast Asia
- Region or state: Nationwide in Indonesia, Malaysia, Singapore and Brunei; also popular in Suriname and the Netherlands
- Created by: Peranakan Chinese
- Serving temperature: Room temperature
- Main ingredients: Rice flour, sugar, coconut milk

Kue lapis, (Note: Indonesian pronunciation: [ˌk(u)we ˈlapɪs]) also known as kuih lapis, (Note: Malay pronunciation: [ˌku(w)eh ˈlapes], also [ˌku(w)ɪh ˈlapɪs]) and kueh lapis (lit. 'layered cake') is a traditional Southeast Asian steamed dessert known for its colourful, multi-layered appearance and soft, chewy texture. It is commonly found in Indonesia, Malaysia, Singapore and Brunei, and is particularly associated with Peranakan cuisine. Due to historical migration and colonial ties, the dessert is also popular in Suriname, where it is known simply as lapis, as well as in the Netherlands.

The dish is believed to have originated from Chinese immigrants, especially those from southern China, who introduced steamed rice cakes such as jiu ceng gao ((traditional Chinese: 九層糕; simplified Chinese: 九层糕, "nine layer cake") to the region. Over time, the recipe was adapted with local ingredients such as coconut milk, pandan and tapioca flour, resulting in the distinctively Southeast Asian version known today as kuih lapis.

Kue lapis shares similarities with several traditional layered desserts across Southeast Asia that also bear Chinese culinary influence. In Thailand, a comparable dessert is khanom chan (ขนมชั้น), while in Vietnam, it is known as bánh da lợn. In the Philippines, a similar delicacy is sapin-sapin and in Cambodia, the counterpart is num chak chan (នំចាក់ចាន់). In Lower Myanmar, it is known as kway lapay (ကွေလာပေး) or kway lapaysa (ကွေလာပေးစ).

== Origin ==
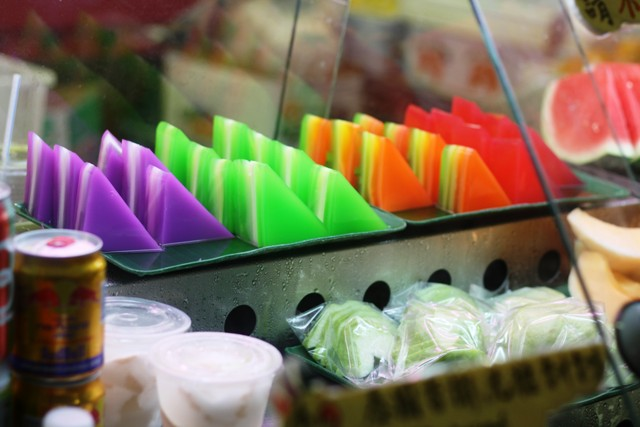
Several rows of triangular kuih lapis in Chinatown, Singapore

The origins of this dessert can be traced to the culinary traditions of Chinese immigrants, particularly those from southern China, who settled in maritime Southeast Asia between the 14th and 20th centuries. These communities introduced various forms of steamed rice cakes, including jiu ceng gao (traditional Chinese: 九層糕; simplified Chinese: 九层糕), meaning "nine layer cake", which were typically prepared with rice flour and steamed one layer at a time. This layered steaming technique later became central to the preparation of the Southeast Asian version.

The term "kuih", also spelled "kue", is derived from the Hokkien and Teochew word 粿 (koé), which refers to steamed cakes or dumplings made from rice or glutinous rice flour. This reflects the Chinese influence on the naming and culinary tradition. The word lapis, meaning "layers" in Malay and Indonesian, refers to the dessert’s defining feature: its colourful, stacked appearance.

As Chinese immigrants integrated with local populations, particularly through intermarriage with pribumi and Malay communities, a distinct Peranakan Chinese culture emerged. This blended culture combined Chinese culinary techniques with regional Southeast Asian ingredients and flavours. Within this cultural context, jiu ceng gao was adapted into what is now recognised as kue lapis, incorporating local ingredients such as coconut milk, pandan leaves and tapioca flour.

The adapted version generally features a softer texture and a more aromatic profile compared to its Chinese predecessor. Although jiu ceng gao traditionally consists of nine layers, this local layered steamed dessert varies in the number of layers; some recipes retain the nine layers while others use fewer or more, depending on regional or familial preferences. The use of vivid colours, often pink, green and white, enhances its festive appeal, making it a popular item during celebrations and religious ceremonies.

Across Southeast Asia, this dessert has undergone regional adaptations. Variations may include ingredients such as yam or a wider spectrum of colours, each imbued with specific symbolic meanings. In contemporary settings, the dessert has also been reinterpreted with modern flavours such as matcha, chocolate and espresso, often featured in urban cafés and bakeries. These changes reflect broader patterns of culinary adaptation and variation over time.

== Cultural significance ==
Among the Peranakan community, kue lapis carries cultural and symbolic significance beyond its role as a traditional dessert. During Chinese New Year, the cake is often served as a metaphor for upward progress, its tiered structure resembling a ladder to success. It is also included in ancestral offerings during the Qingming Festival, reflecting its role in both festive and commemorative practices. In some Peranakan households, particularly in Penang, it is also commonly referred to as jiu ceng kueh (九层粿) and it is associated with themes of prosperity, continuity and generational legacy. The layers are interpreted as representing successive generations, with the traditional nine-layer version symbolising a wish for an unbroken lineage.

In Myanmar, the dessert is known as kway lapay (ကွေလာပေး) or kway lapaysa (ကွေလာပေးစ), names derived from its Malay designation. This reflects historical cultural ties between Penang and Myanmar, which were reinforced by intermarriage between Peranakan communities in both regions, particularly from the mid-19th to the mid-20th century.

== Ingredients and cooking method ==
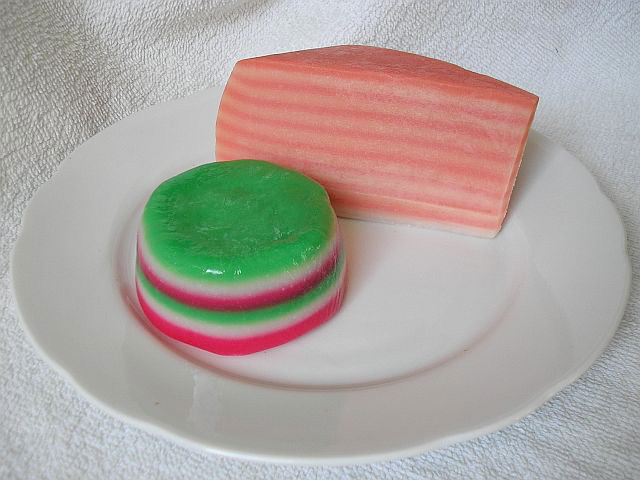
Two shapes of kue lapis

This snack usually consists of two alternating coloured layers, matching its name, the use of different colours makes the layers visible. The cake is made of rice flour, sago, coconut milk, sugar, salt, and food colouring. Popular food colouring includes green-coloured pandan and red frozen food colouring. It is common to find rainbow layered kue too. This cake is steamed gradually, and layers are subsequently added in alternating order to avoid different colours mixing together. This method will create a layered pudding-cake. Kue lapis has a bouncy gelatin-like texture, yet, unlike jelly, this cake is quite sticky and chewy due to the rice pudding content.

Kue lapis is similar to lapis legit, the difference being that lapis legit is a puffy layered cake, made of flour and is baked, while kue lapis is a moist layered pudding, made of rice flour and sago, and is steamed.

== See also ==
- List of steamed foods
