= Dobos torte =

Hungarian sponge cake

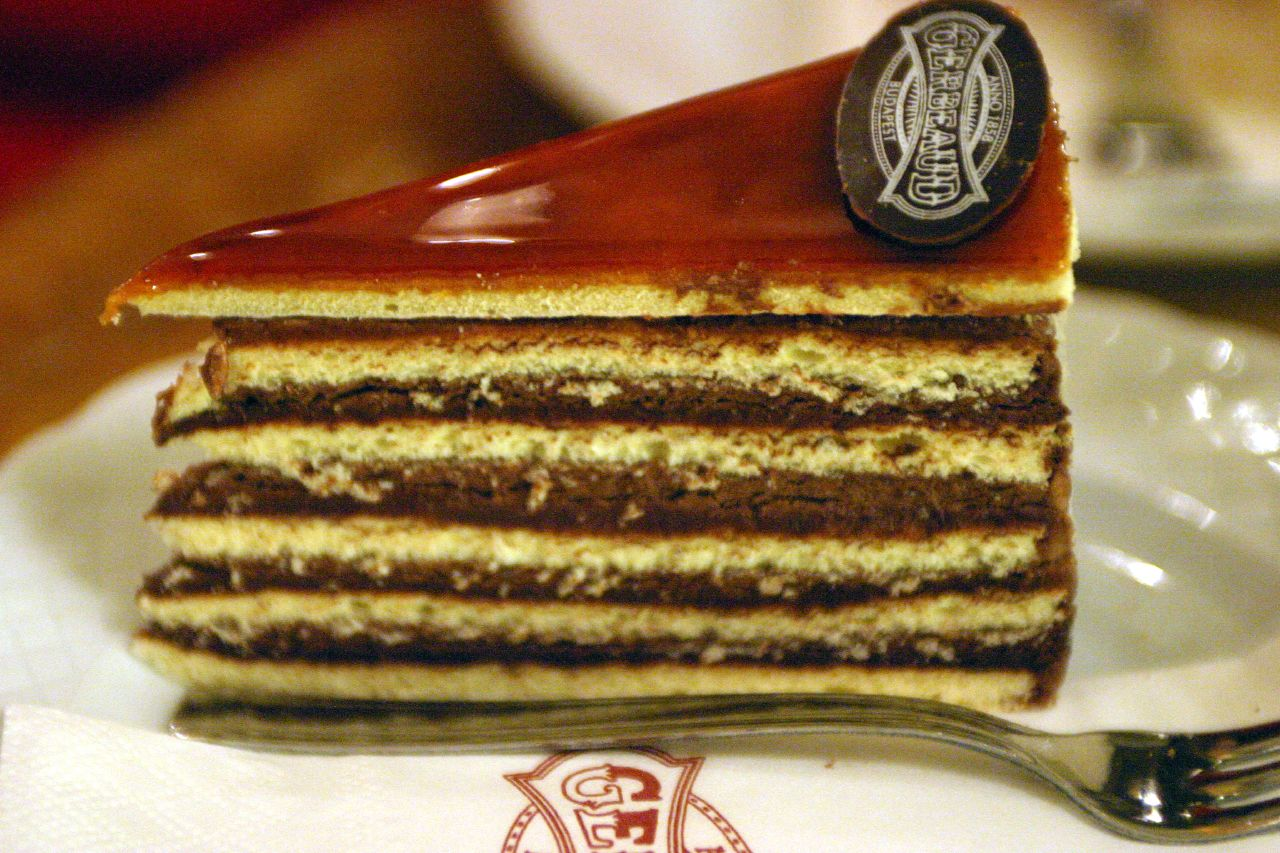
- A slice of Dobos from Café Gerbeaud
- Alternative names: Dobosh, Dobos-torta, Dobostorta
- Course: Dessert
- Place of origin: Hungary
- Created by: József C. Dobos
- Serving temperature: Hot or cold
- Main ingredients: Sponge cake, buttercream, caramel

Dobos torte (Hungarian: dobostorta [ˈdoboʃtortɒ]), also known as Dobosh, is a Hungarian sponge cake layered with chocolate buttercream and topped with caramel. The layered pastry is named after its inventor, Hungarian chef József C. Dobos, a delicatessen owner in Budapest. In the late 19th century, he decided to create a cake that would last longer than other pastries in an age when cooling techniques were limited. The round sides of the cake are coated with ground hazelnuts, chestnuts, walnuts, or almonds, and the hardened caramel top helps to prevent drying out, for a longer shelf life.

== History ==
Dobos torte was introduced at the National General Exhibition of Budapest in 1885; Emperor Franz Joseph I and Empress Elisabeth were among the first to taste it. The cake became popular throughout Europe, both for its durability through shipping and for its unique appearance. With its flat, shiny, caramel glazed top, it was simple but elegant, as opposed to the more intricate cakes of the age. Its use of fine chocolate buttercream was very little known at the time because cake fillings and frostings were usually made with cooked pastry cream or whipped cream. Dobos had discovered buttercream while traveling in France, but he invented the batter of the cake.

The cream incorporated cocoa butter for extra smoothness. During his lifetime, the cake was often imitated, but never reproduced. Dobos traveled to other countries in Europe to introduce his cake, and soon began exporting the product in specially designed wooden boxes. Near the end of his career, in 1906, Dobos donated his recipe to the Pastry and Honey-Makers' Guild.

== See also ==
- Doberge cake – a layered dessert originating in New Orleans, Louisiana, adapted from the Dobos torte
- Dobash cake – a layered cake originating in Hawaii using a cocoa based pudding, also adapted from the Dobos torte
- Opera cake – a French multi-layered dessert made of sponge cake and buttercream.
- Prinzregententorte – a Bavarian torte consisting of, usually seven, thin layers of sponge cake interlaid with chocolate buttercream
- Rigó Jancsi – a traditional Hungarian cube-shaped, layered, chocolate sponge cake and chocolate cream pastry
- Smith Island cake – similar to the Prinzregententorte, with 8 to 15 thin layers filled with creme, frosting and/or crushed candy bars, and iced with a cooked chocolate icing
- Spekkoek – a type of Indonesian layer cake which commonly has more than 18 layers and contains a mix of Indonesian spices
- Stack cake – an Appalachian cake made of many layers that is filled and frosted with applesauce made from dried apples or cooked down fruit butters
