= Hübner Haus =

Office building and former café and factory in Hamburg

Hübner-Haus
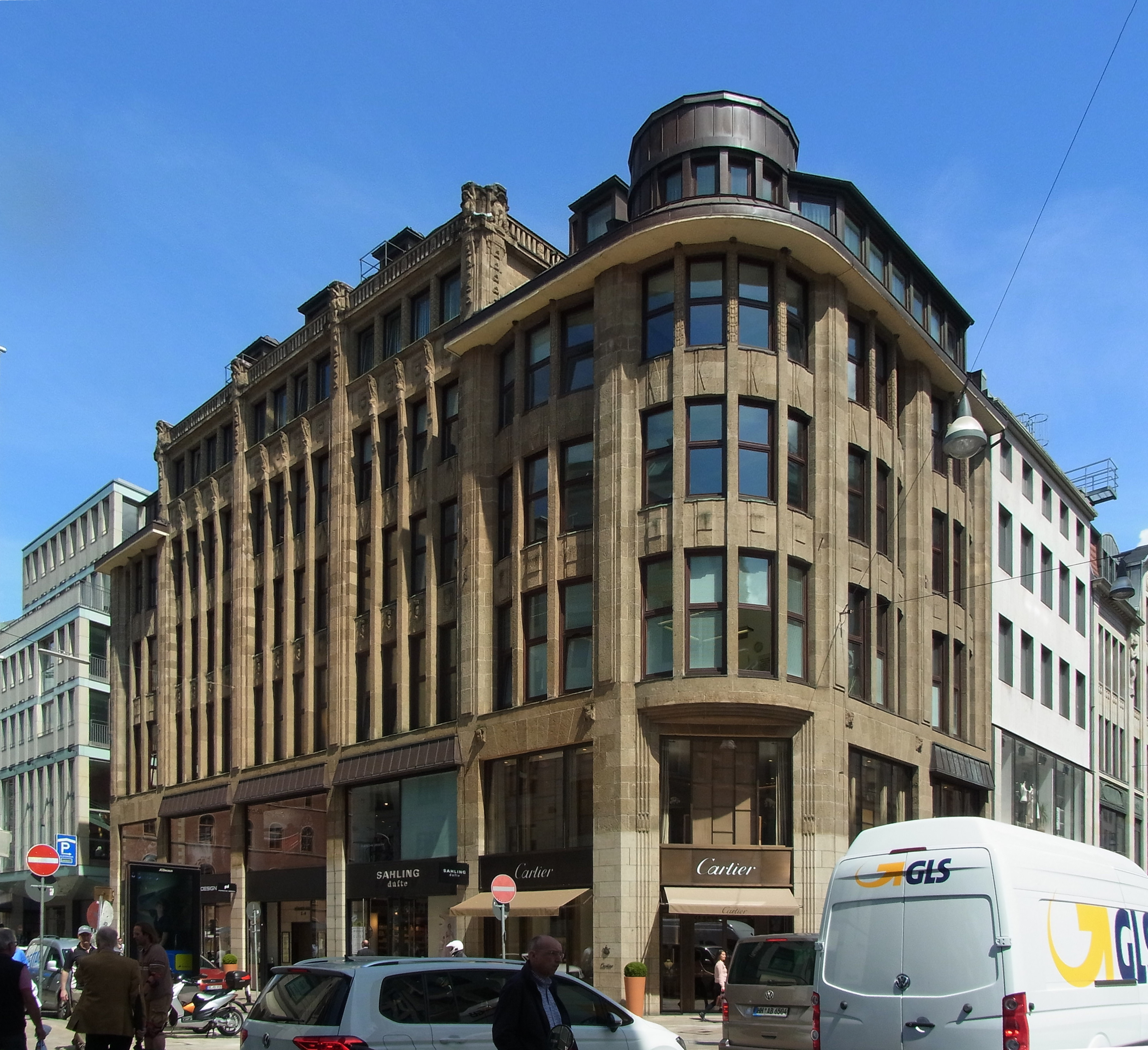
- Interactive map of the Hübner-Haus area

General information
- Type: offices
- Architectural style: Wiener Werkstätte
- Location: Neuer Wall 22, Poststrasse 2-4, Hamburg, Germany
- Coordinates: 53°33′8″N 9°59′21″E
- Completed: 1909

Design and construction
- Architect: Henry Grell

References
- Architektur Bildarchiv

The Hübner-Haus is an office building on Poststrasse between the Neuer Wall and the street Bei der Stadtwassermühle in the Neustadt district in the Mitte section of Hamburg, Germany. It is managed by Hübner Grundstücksverwaltung GmbH & Co KG, of which Thomas Hübner is the managing director. Designed by Henry Grell, it was the first building constructed in concrete in Hamburg, and was completed in 1909.

== Construction ==
Originally only the building at Neuer Wall 22 belonged to the Hübner Haus. The building has five floors, a classical facade and is located on the corner of Poststrasse. In 1907 Georg Hübner (Senior) bought the property at Poststrasse 2-4 and had it rebuilt. The new building was connected to the original building on Neuer Wall and so it became today's corner building. It is considered the first concrete building in Hamburg and is outwardly almost unchanged except for the top floor and the shop window area. The architect for the extension from Poststraße to Straße bei der Stadtwassermühle was Henry Grell; it was completed in 1909. With its closely lined columns and the flat bay windows, the façade corresponds to the most progressive state of the office building architecture at the time of construction. The highest level was aimed for with the interior design. This is particularly evident in the entrance hall, which is lavishly furnished in the style of the Wiener Werkstätte.

== The Hübner Company ==
Christian Georg Adolph Hübner was the son of a ship owner from Warnemünde. In 1883 he swore the Hamburg citizen oath and founded a company together with his wife Mathilde, which he entered in the commercial register on 8 July 1884, under the name Georg Hübner. The company had a pastry shop, a marzipan factory and a café. It acquired a reputation as a very fine café, serving homemade cakes and tarts and marzipan; likewise, the stylish furnishings of the café met the highest standards. In a showcase in today's stairwell there are historical pictures commemorating the Café Hübner, showing the café, the premises and the furnishings. Drawings show well-dressed women in large hats and gentlemen from the upper crust of Hamburg society who were regular guests there. The café was so exclusive that even women were allowed to meet there for coffee, tea, or hot chocolate without a male companion, then a rarity in Hamburg.

The building on Neuer Wall soon became too small for the company and the café, which was mainly run by Mathilde Hübner. The family decided to expand and so they bought the neighboring property on Poststrasse. Georg Hübner senior did not live to see the completion of the building; his son Georg (junior) completed the construction. The café and pastry shop were now on the two lower floors of the new corner building, the two middle floors were mainly rented to lawyers and brokers and the two upper floors were used for baking and making marzipan. Hübner's delicacies were often delivered to the town hall and the marzipan was even exported.

== World Wars ==
The First World War hit the Hübner company hard; the time of delicious feasts was over. After the war the Weimar Republic experienced massive inflation, and as a result, even the well-heeled regulars became impoverished and stayed away. The décor in the café also changed; instead of furnishings inspired by Japanism and wall paintings, the café on the upper floor now was renovated in wood panelling and fabric covers - remaining cosy, but no longer luxurious. The rooms were divided up differently; there was a smoking salon for around 150 guests and a separate ladies' salon. During the Second World War, the Hübner Haus had the only functioning water pump on the Neuer Wall, and many people came only for that purpose. In addition, the café expanded its kitchen and instituted a lunch service, before the currency reform prohibiting food stamps. As a result, Café Hübner became an important supplier for the many working-class residents. After the war, with the currency reform of 20 June 1948, the German mark stabilized and the Hübner company's fortunes also improved. The very next day, the pastry shop began selling pies, cakes, sorbets and many other delicacies again. In 1961, however, the café was finally closed for personal reasons.

== Modern offices and commercial space ==
The Hübner-Haus is now a modern commercial building in the city center on the corner of Poststrasse and Neuer Wall. There are shops on the ground floor and the mezzanine, while the floors above contain a mixture of office space and various doctors' practices. The Hübner Grundstücksverwaltung GmbH & Co KG is located on the top floor. In the entrance foyer on the ground floor, the company founder and namesake of the building and the café at the time are memorialized. Above the entrance the name Hübner-Haus is emblazoned and the door handles of the entrance door bear a double letter H. The idea of a small exhibition in a showcase to commemorate Café Hübner stems from the great-grandson of the company founder, Jörg Hübner, who died an accidental death in 2003; the objects on display come from his collection. The family history is documented there in text panels, historical pictures of the café and the marzipan factory as well as porcelain - white, with the family names. Jörg Hübner did not see the completion of the showcase, but relatives and friends oversaw its completion.

There are two small elevators on the left, while the staircase is on the right. In between there is a box that gives the impression that the concierge is about to return. Sometimes there is a light on there, and there is a historical one on the wall. There is also a telephone, an open newspaper from earlier times placed on the desk, and writing utensils. During the Christmas season, the box is decorated with a garland and decorative gift packages on the roof. In the entrance area there are marble walls with graphic patterns and colored mosaic tiles - some in gold - on the door frames of the intermediate door. The walls on the upper floors are brightly tiled with graphic ornaments, while the elevators on the floors are trimmed with mosaic tiles.

The Hübner house is registered as an office building under number 29194 in the list of cultural monuments of the authority for culture and media in the Hamburg-Mitte district at the addresses Bei der Stadtwassermühle 1 and Poststraße 2–4, as of 8 July 2019.

== Gallery ==
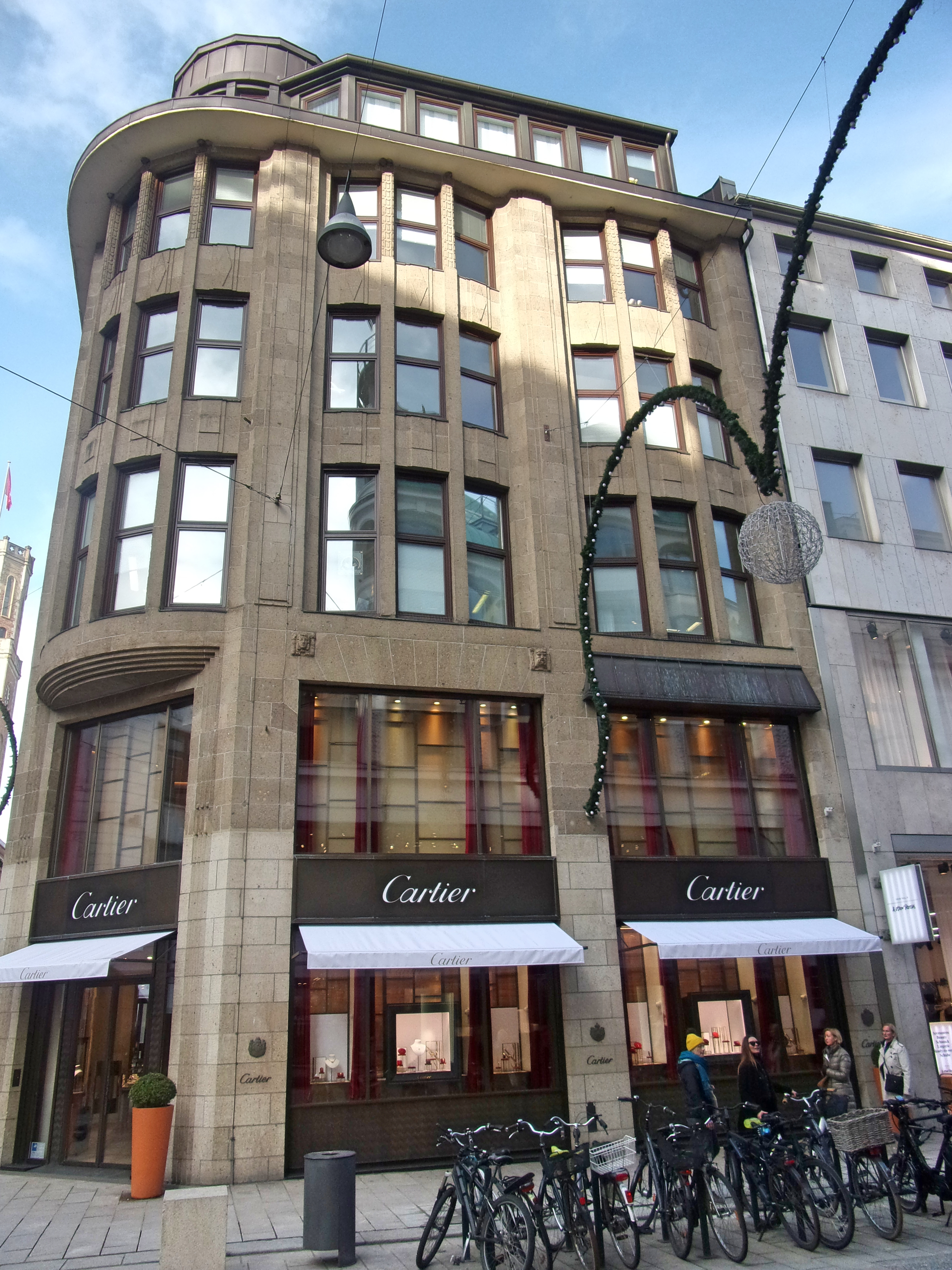
Initial building Neuen Wall

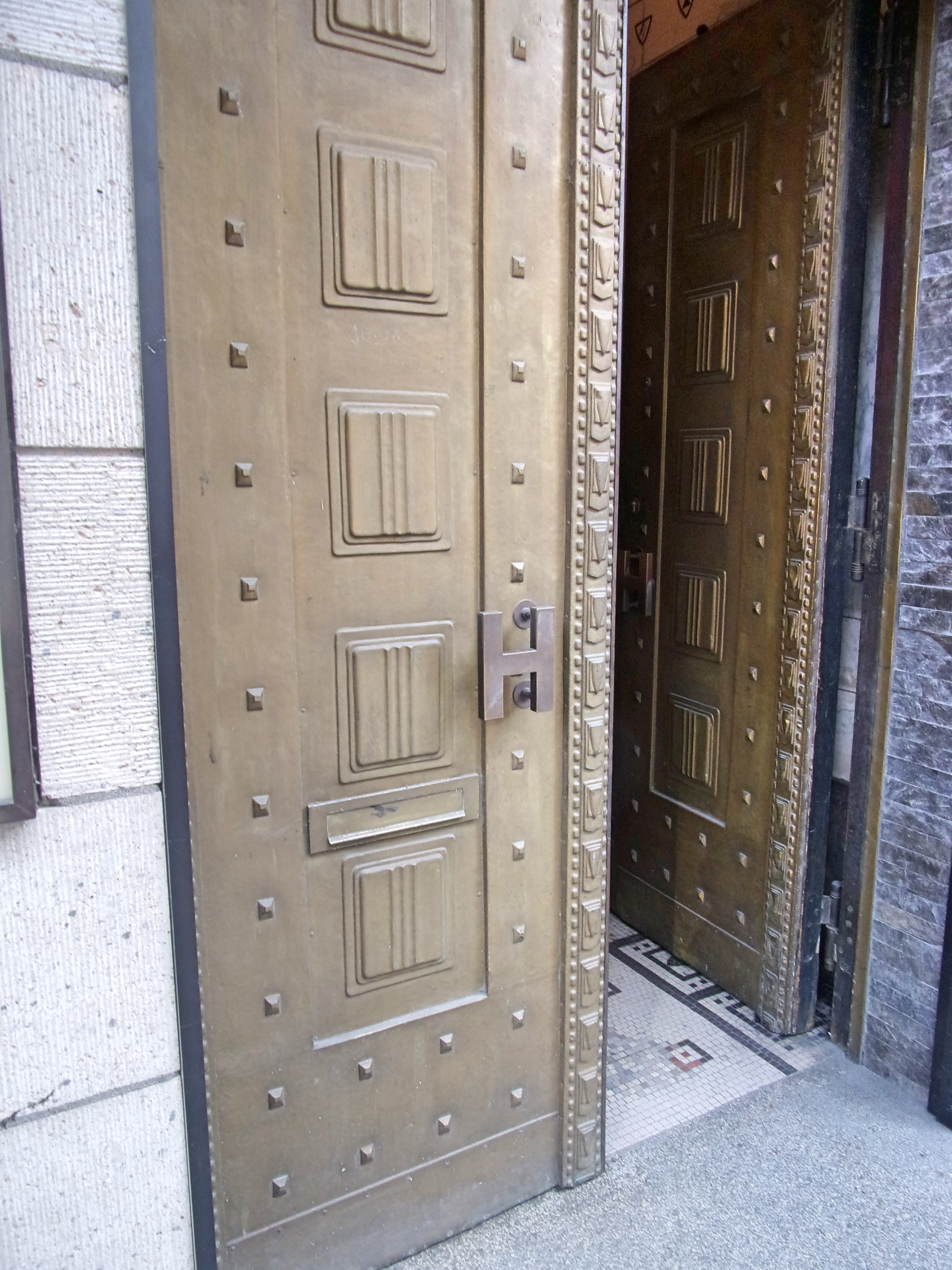
Entrance doors from Poststraße 2–4 with initial

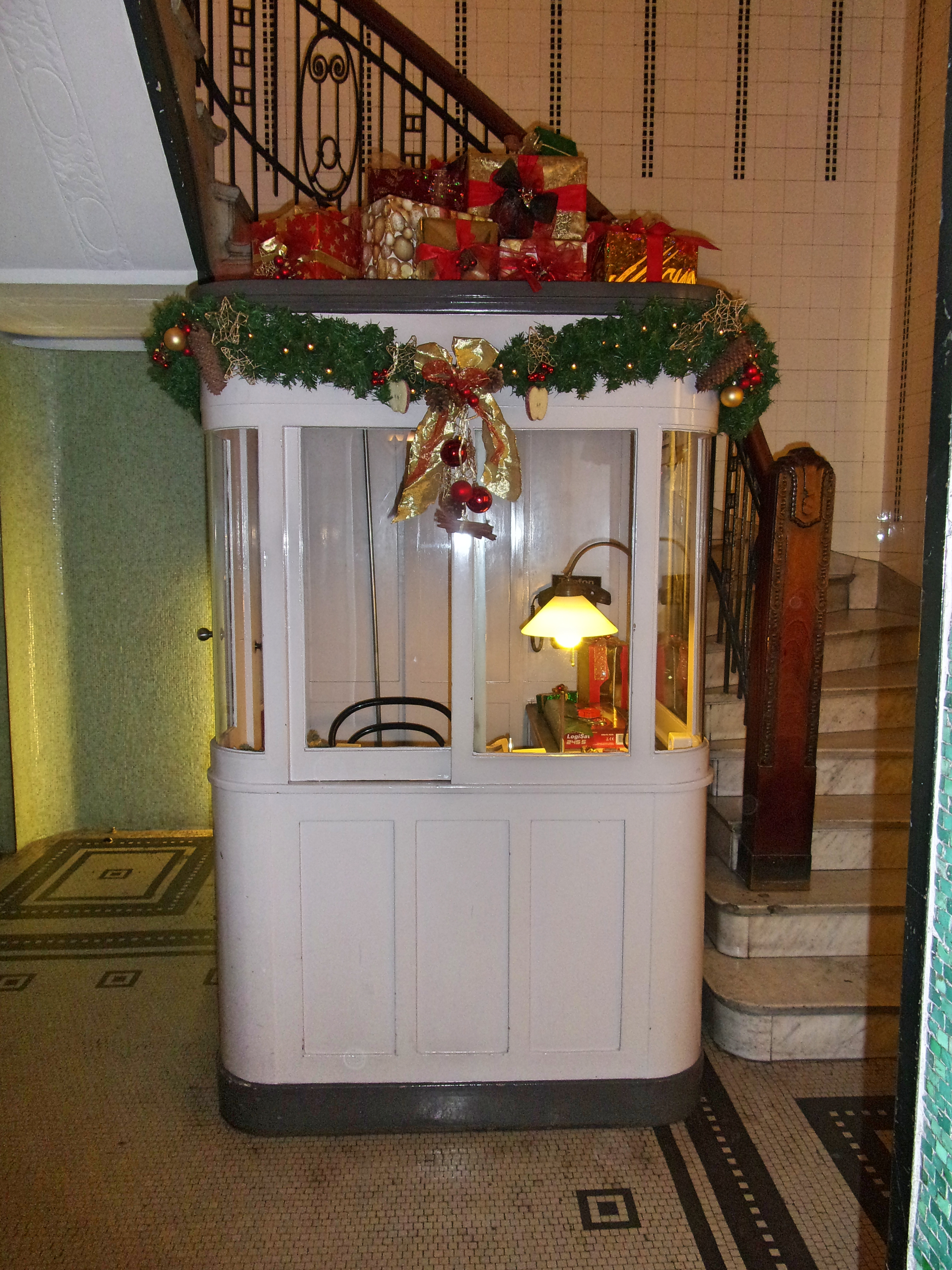
Decorated concierge loge

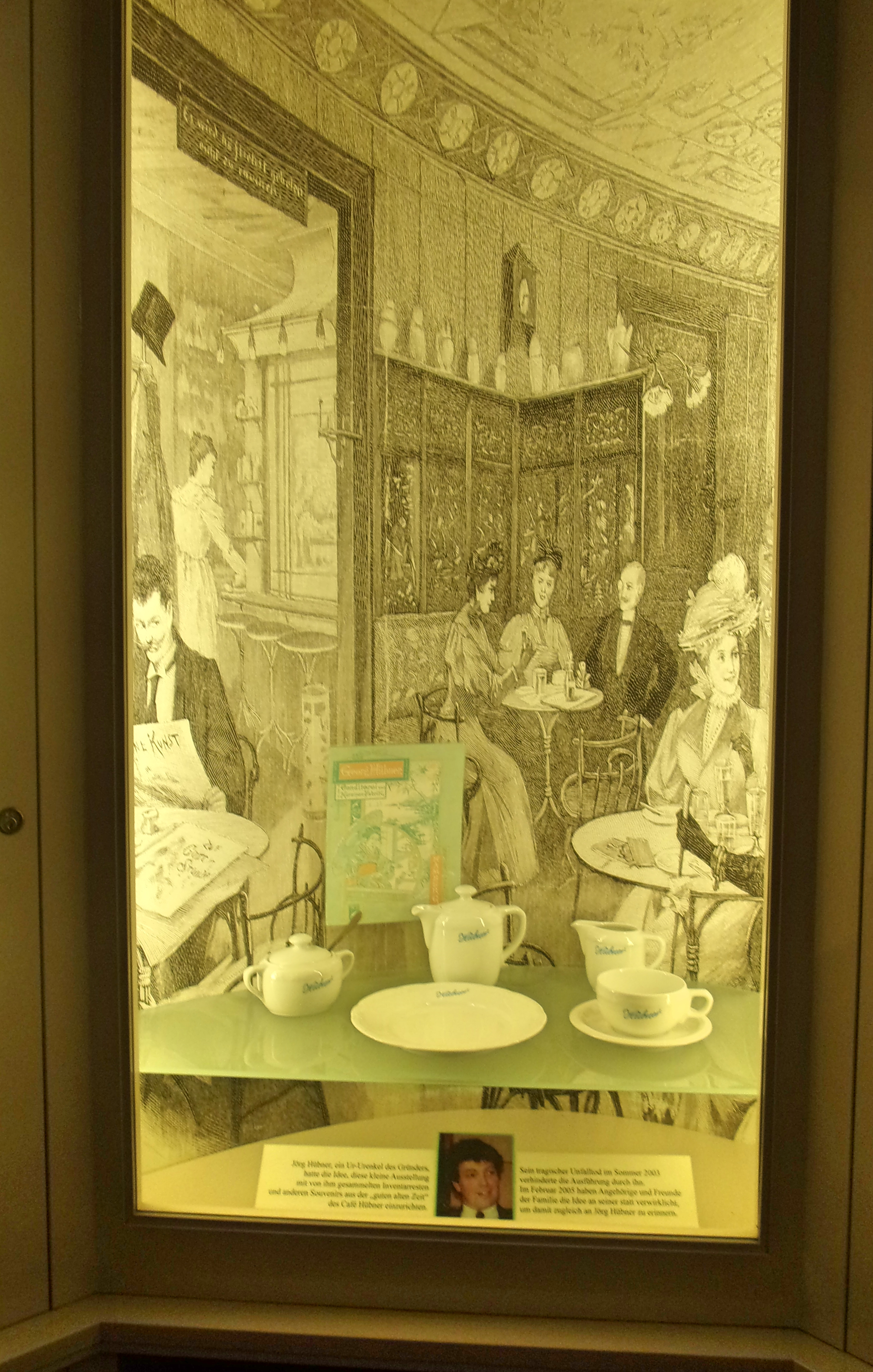
Scene in the former Café Huebner, exhibit in the showcase

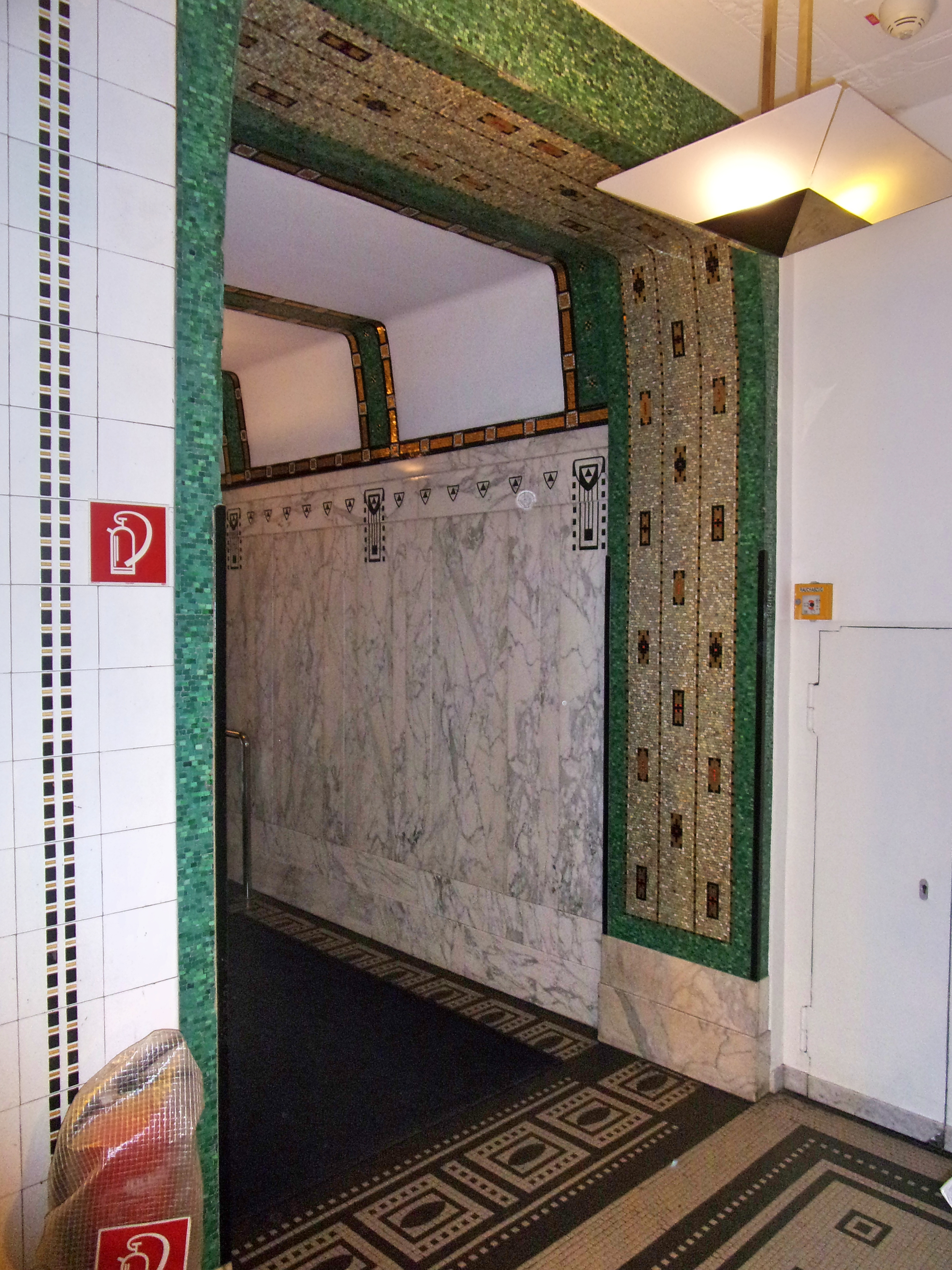
Ground floor and entry

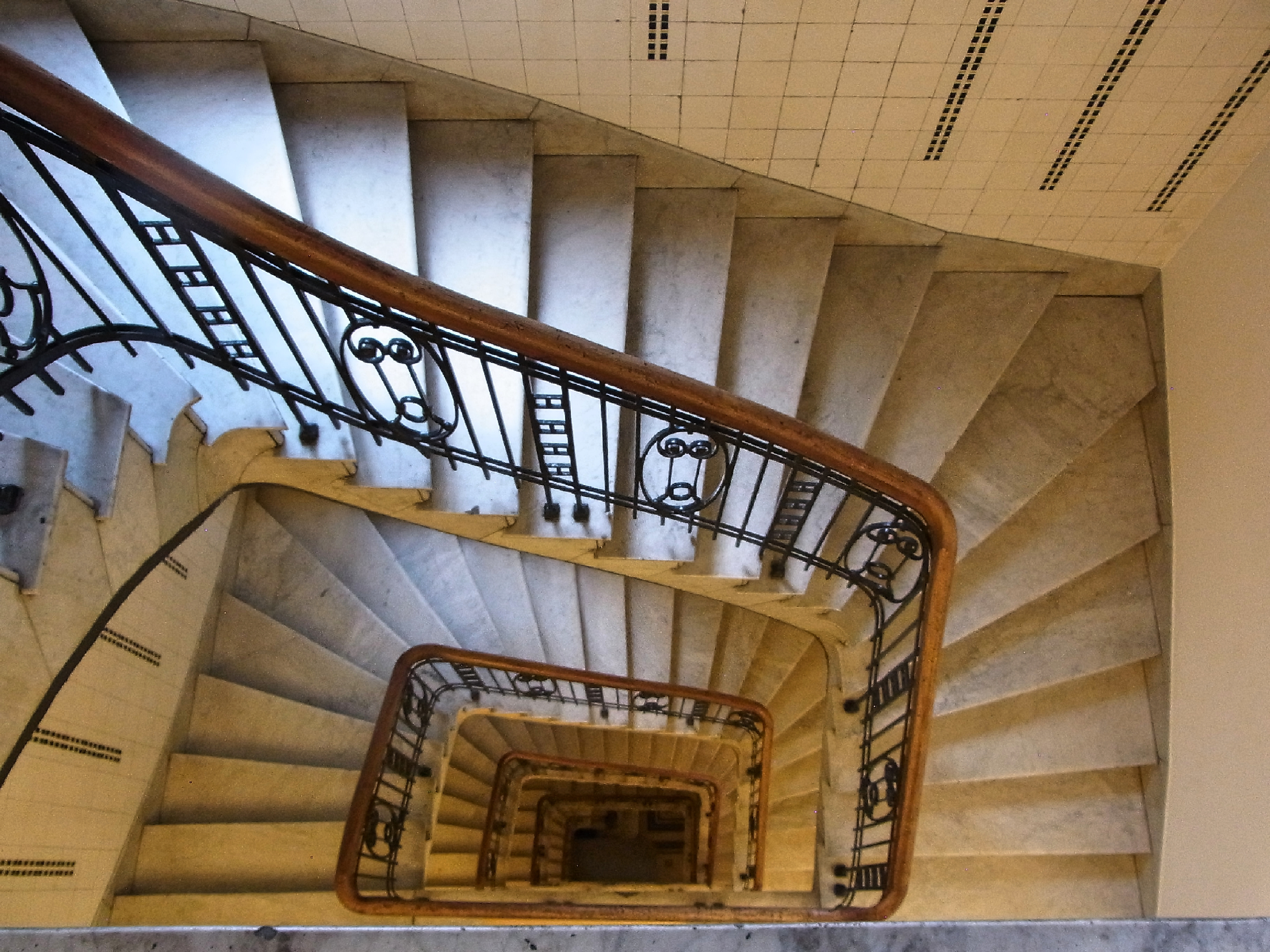
Staircase

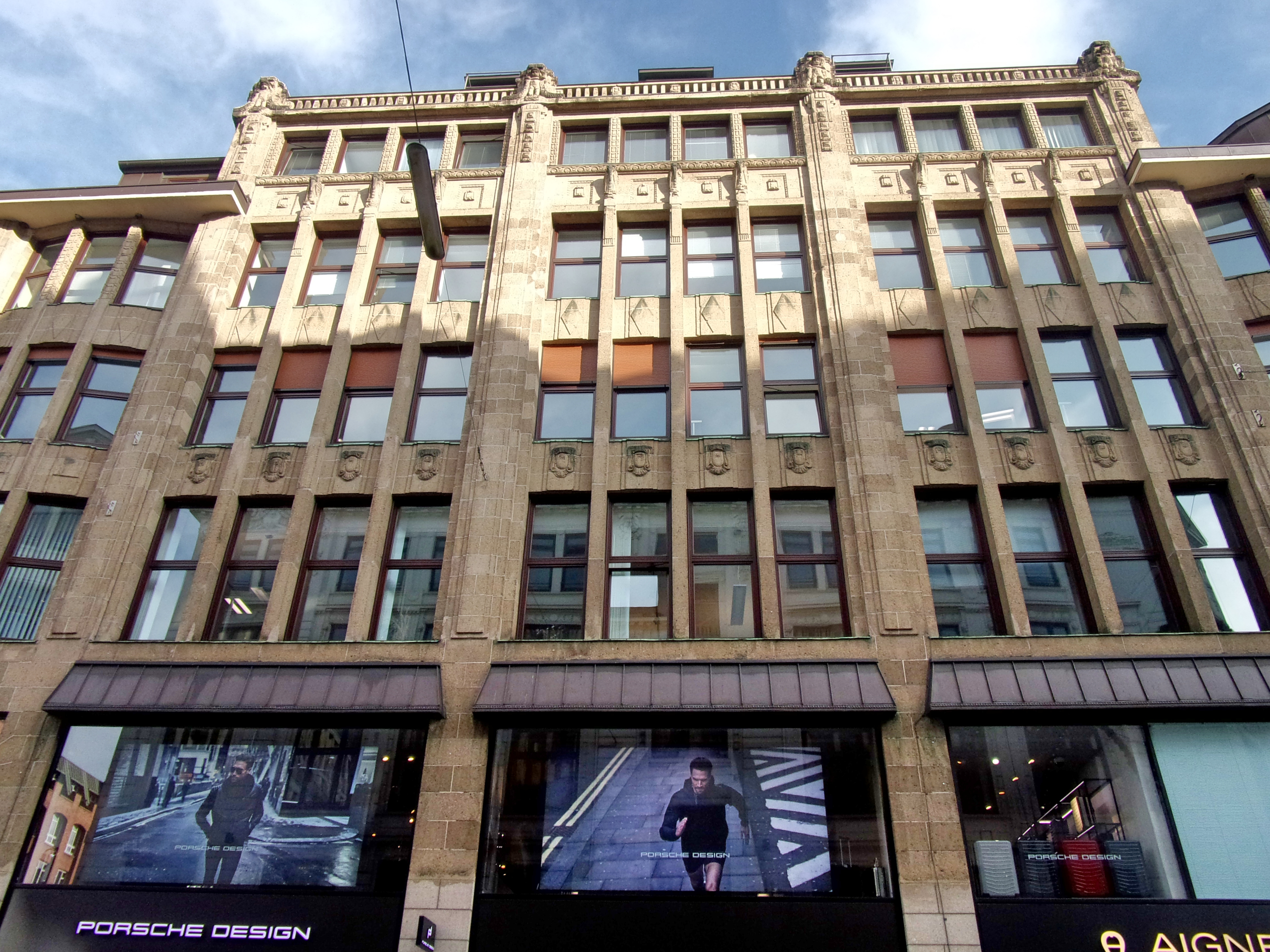
View of façade on Poststraße

== Bibliography ==
- Ralf Lange, Architektur in Hamburg. Hamburg: Junius Verlag, 2008. ISBN 978-3-88506-586-9, S. 45.
- Ralf Lange, Das Hamburger Kontorhaus. Hamburg: Dölling und Galitz Verlag, 2015. ISBN 978-3-86218-067-7.
