= Marzipan =

Confection of sugar and almond flour

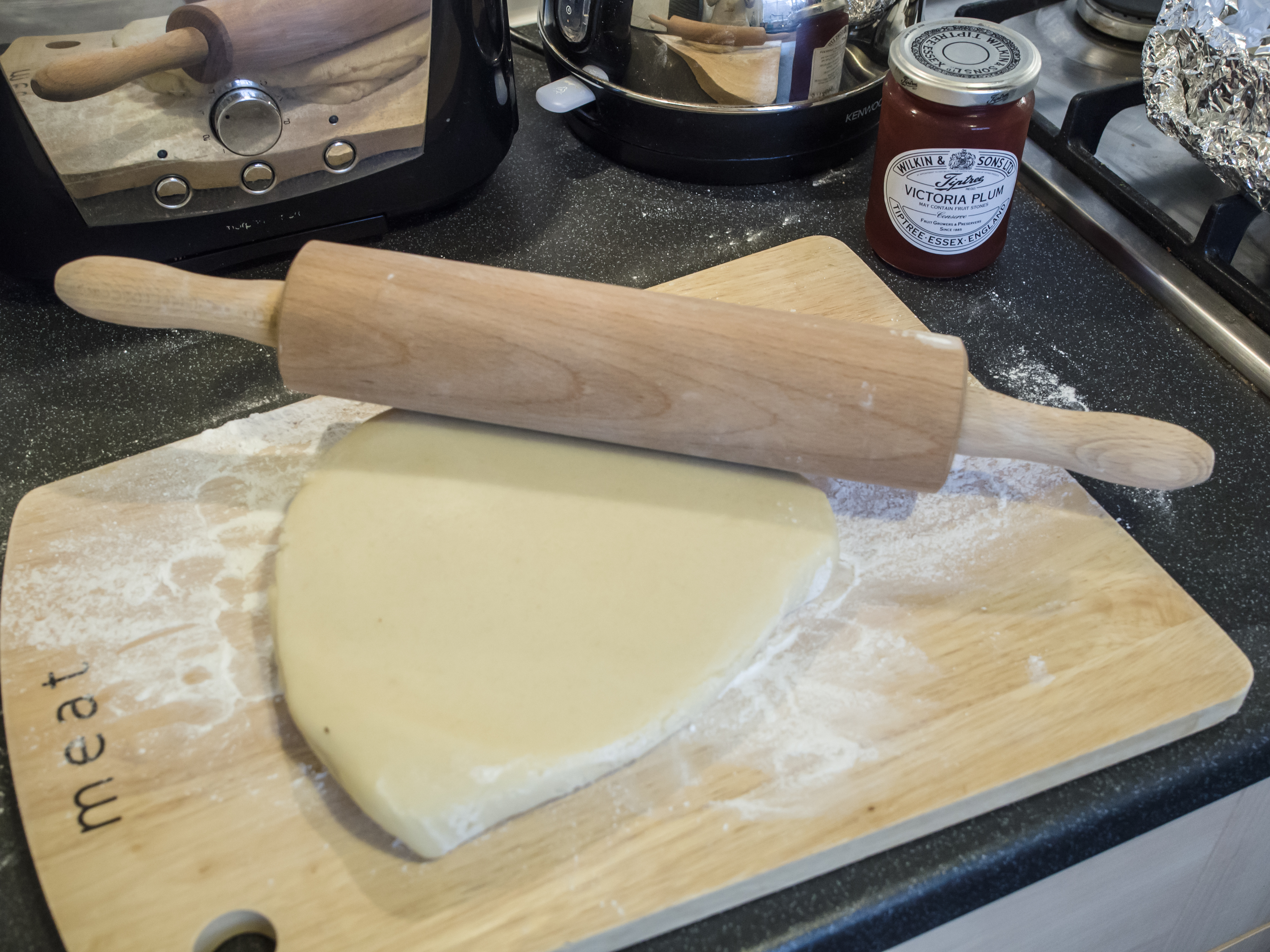
- Plain marzipan being rolled flat
- Alternative names: Marzapane, marchpane
- Type: Confectionery
- Main ingredients: Almond meal, sugar
- Variations: Persipan, frutta martorana

Marzipan is a confection consisting primarily of sugar and almond meal (ground almonds), sometimes augmented with almond oil or extract. Variants can be made from other nuts, or apricot or peach kernels, instead of almonds.

It is often made into sweets; common uses are chocolate-covered marzipan and small marzipan imitations of fruits and vegetables. It can also be used in biscuits or rolled into thin sheets and glazed for icing cakes, primarily birthday cakes, wedding cakes and Christmas cakes. Marzipan may also be used as a baking ingredient, as in stollen or banket. In some countries, it is shaped into small figures of animals as a traditional treat for New Year's Day or Christmas. Marzipan is used in some versions of king cake eaten during the Carnival season.

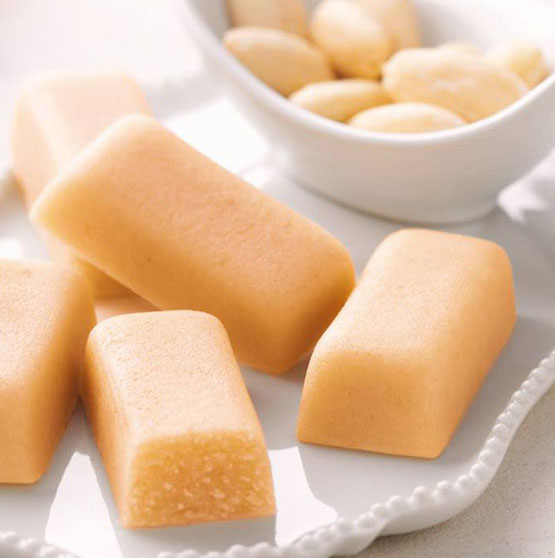
Marzipan bars

== Around the world ==
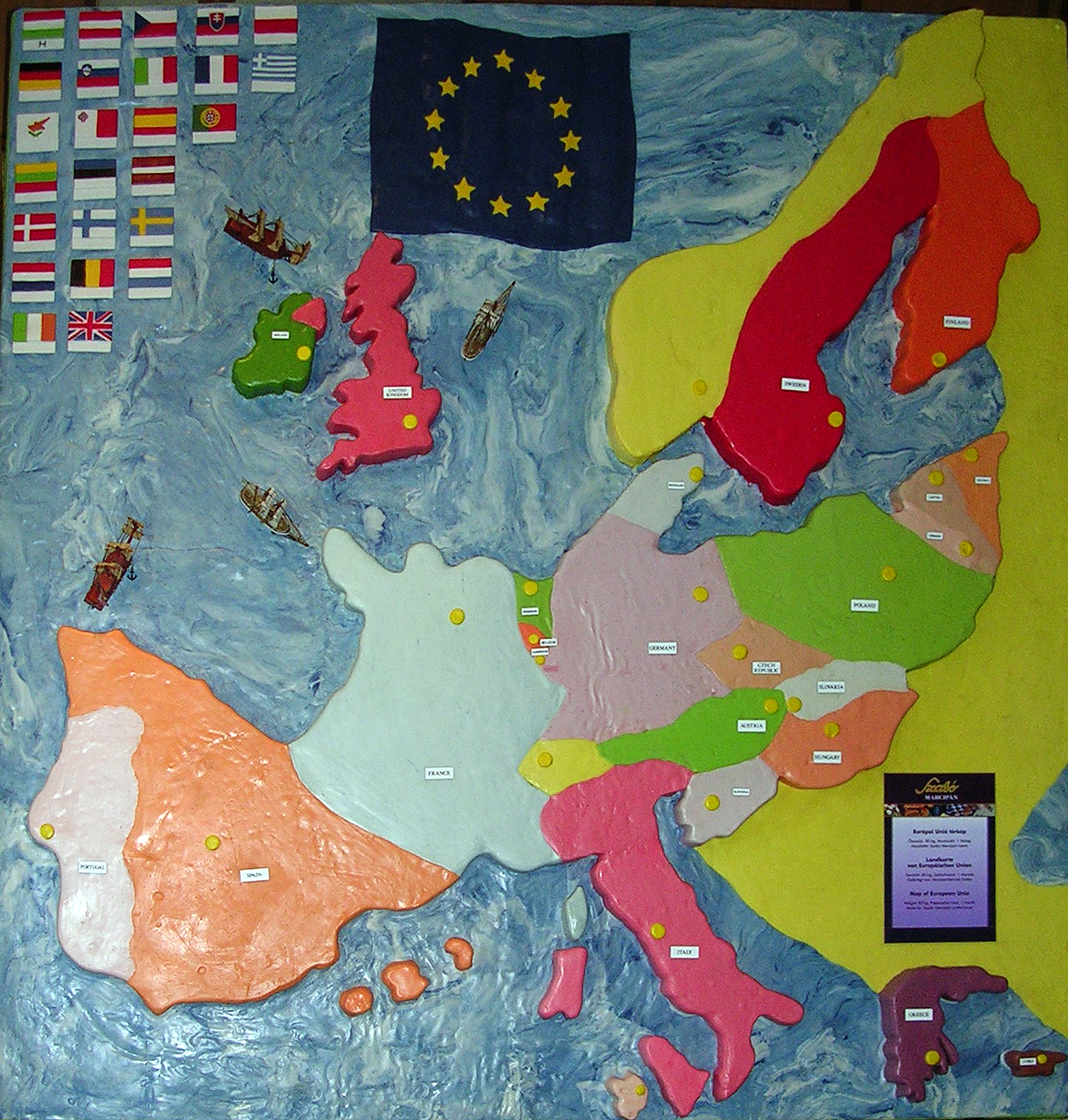
A map of the European Union made by the Budapest Marzipan Museum, commemorating the induction of Hungary into the union in 2004

=== Europe ===
The Geographical indications and traditional specialities in the European Union recognize two marzipans in Europe: one in Toledo (Spain) and one in Lübeck (Germany).

==== Southern Europe ====
In Spain, marzipan is a traditional Christmas dessert (mazapán), although in Toledo, where the first written reference to this product dates back to 1512, it is eaten all year round. In Italy, particularly in Palermo, marzipan (marzapane) is often shaped and painted with food colourings to resemble fruit—frutta martorana—especially during the Christmas season and on Il Giorno dei Morti (All Souls' Day) on November 2. May 9 and 10 are also special days for eating marzipan in Sicily. In Portugal, where the confection has been traditionally made by nuns, marzipan (maçapão) is used to make fruit-shaped sweets; in the Algarve region in particular it is a very common sweet, where it is shaped like fruits and filled with Fios de ovos. There are other regions, as Toledo in Spain, in which marzipan (mazapán) is shaped into simple animal shapes, and sometimes filled with egg yolk (yema) and sugar. In Greece and Cyprus, marzipan is made in a variety of shapes and sizes and is almost always left white. In the islands of the Aegean in particular, white marzipan is considered a wedding treat and is served to guests at wedding feasts. In Malta, marzipan is used as a filling in the traditional Maltese Easter treats called figolli (singular: figolla). It is also popular in Turkey, where it is called badem ezmesi. There are two regional variations registered in the Turkish Patent and Trademark Office.

==== Northern Europe ====
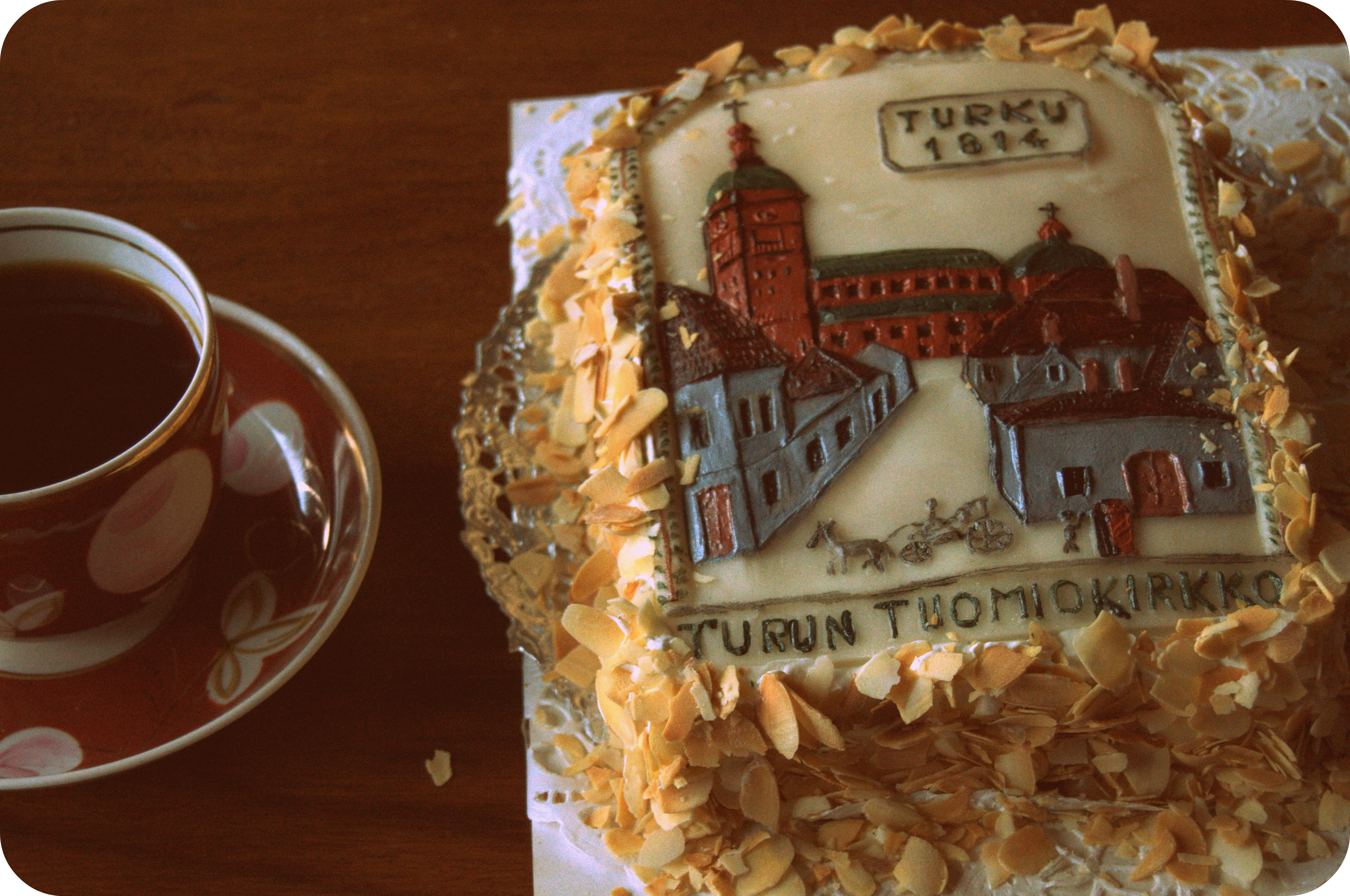
Turku cathedral cake made with marzipan

In Denmark, Sweden and Norway, it is customary to snack on marzipan pigs around Christmas, marzipan shaped as eggs around Easter, and kransekage on New Year's Eve. It is also used in a wide variety of cakes and confectioneries unrelated to the holidays, including træstammer, gåsebryst, and napoleonshatte, and as an ingredient in remonce-filling for Danish pastry.

In Tallinn, Estonia, there is a museum with a collection of items about the history and manufacture of marzipan.

Traditional Swedish princess cake is typically covered with a layer of marzipan that has been tinted pale green or pink.

Traditional Finnish Käpykakku is typically coated with a layer of marzipan, which is dark brown color and conifer cone-shaped and spiky.

==== Western and Central Europe ====
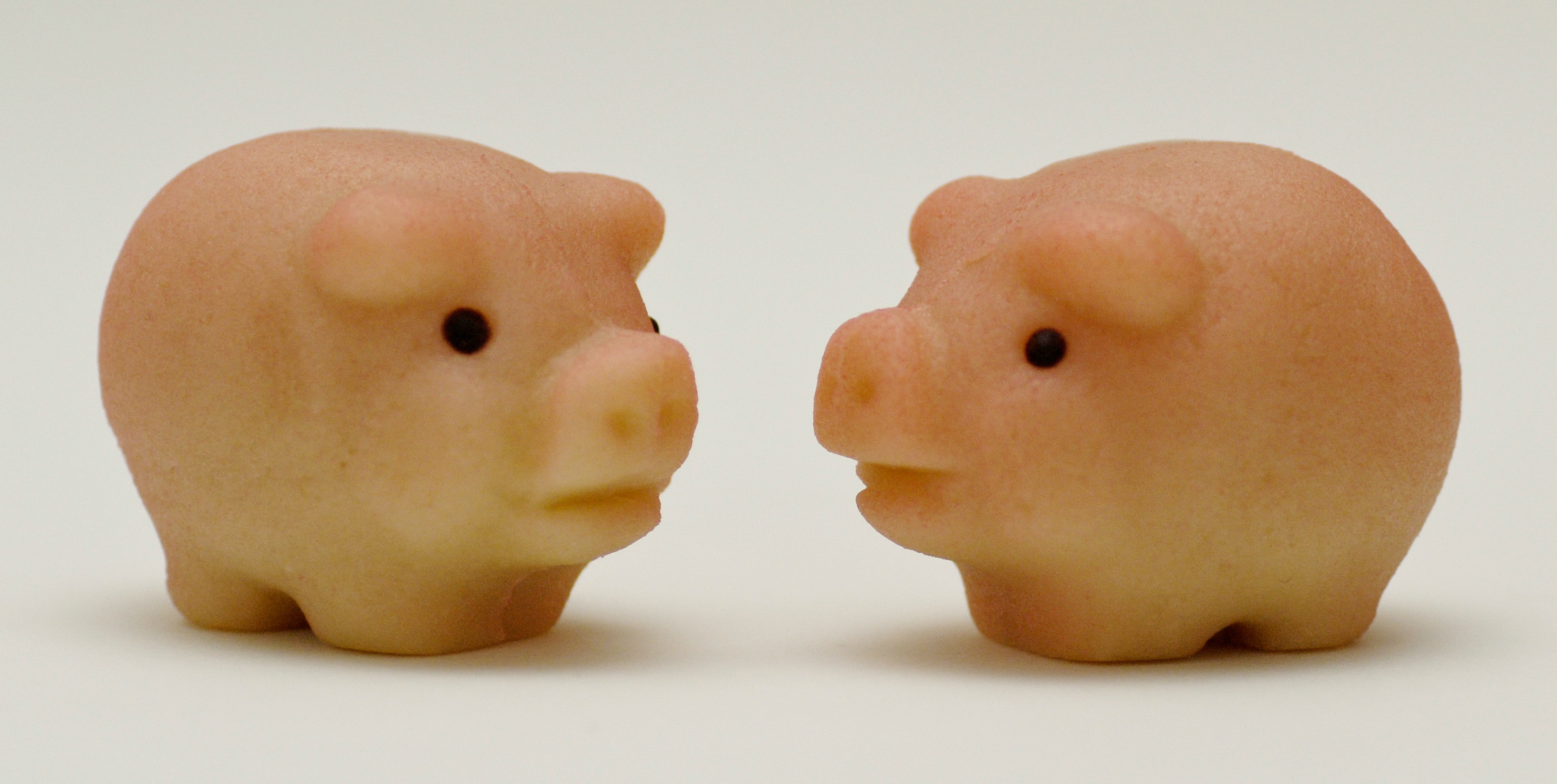
Moulded marzipan pigs

In Belgium and the Netherlands, marsepein ('marzipan') figures are given as Sinterklaas (Saint Nicholas) presents.

In France, massepain is the specialty of Saint-Léonard-de-Noblat, a town in Limousin. It comes in biscuit shape. It is also prepared in Gironde, it is named 'Girondin pudding' made from hard bread, brown sugar and flavored with raisins soaked in rum.

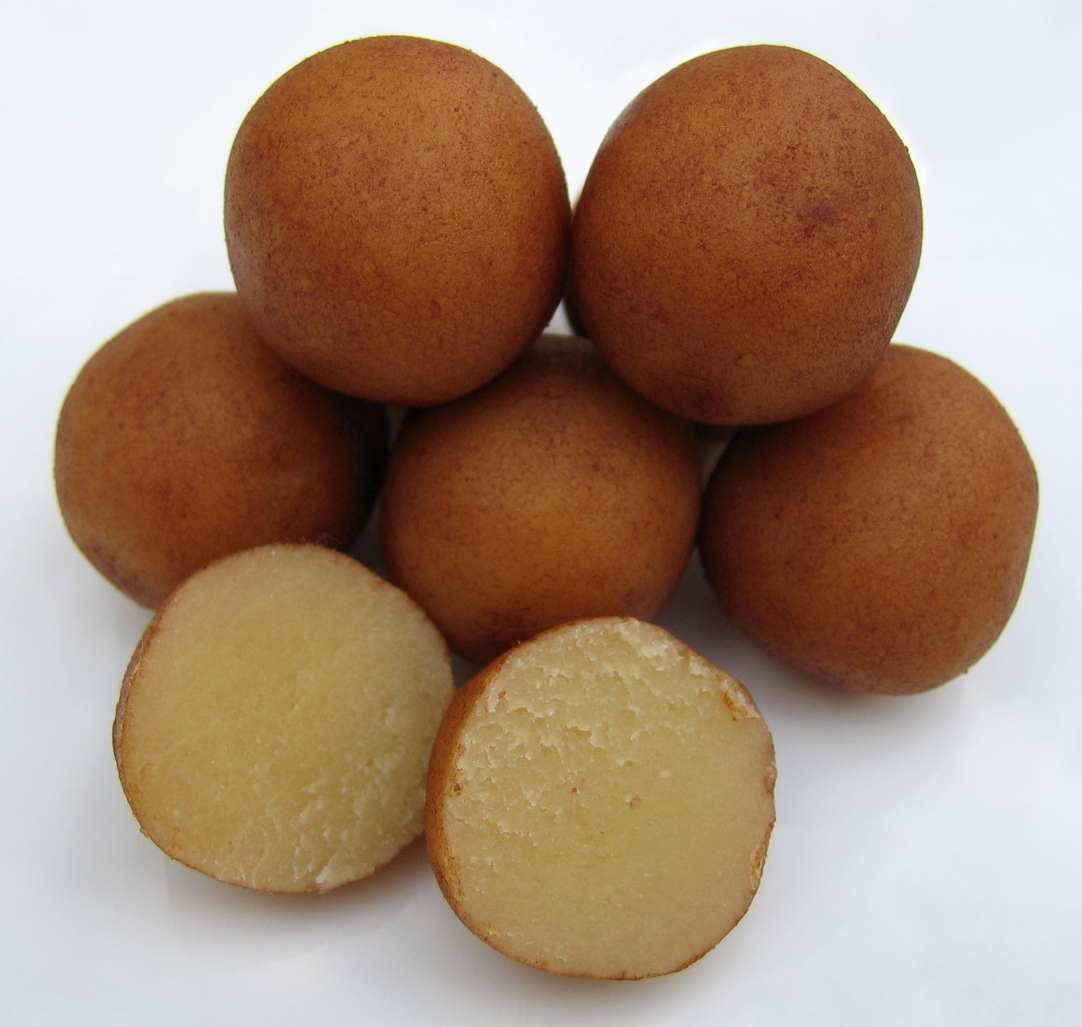
Marzipankartoffeln

In Germany, it is common to give marzipan in the shape of a loaf of bread (Marzipanbrot) or in the shape of small potatoes (Marzipankartoffeln) during Christmas time. Stollen can contain marzipan, and it is often featured as an ingredient in seasonal baked goods, such as Bethmännchen, Dominosteine and other Christmas cookies. One traditional new year present is known as a Glücksschwein ('lucky pig'). Mozartkugeln are an export of Austria made of marzipan balls dipped in dark chocolate.

In the United Kingdom, celebratory fruitcakes are decorated with a layer of marzipan – particularly Christmas cake which is covered with white sugar icing, and at Easter the Simnel cake contains a layer of marzipan, a further layer decorates the top and is lightly grilled or toasted to colour it. Battenberg cake, which originates in England, is covered in a layer of marzipan.

In Geneva, a traditional part of the celebration of L'Escalade is the ritual smashing of a chocolate cauldron filled with marzipan vegetables, a reference to a Savoyard siege of the city which was supposedly foiled by a housewife with a cauldron of boiling soup.

=== Middle East ===
In Syria, marzipan is known as lozina, lowzineh (Persian: لوزینه, derived from Arabic: لوز lawz, 'almond'), or marçabén (the Arabic: مرصبان). It is flavoured with orange-flower water and shaped into roses and other delicate flowers before being baked. Marzipan can also be made from oatmeal, farina, or semolina.

For Jews in Iran, marzipan fruit is a traditional Passover treat, replacing biscuits and cakes. According to Sephardic Jewish custom, friends of the woman giving birth would cook for her and prepare homemade marzipan. This was believed to enhance the mother’s milk and was considered a symbol of purity and good fortune for both mother and baby.

=== The Americas ===
In Hispanic American cuisine, marzipan is known by the Spanish: mazapán and is traditionally eaten at Christmas. In some Latin American countries, forms of mazapán are made from nuts or seeds other than almonds. In Guatemala, a specialty mazapán from Amatitlán is made with pumpkin seed (pepita), rice and sugar. Mexican mazapán is typically made from peanuts. This peanut paste preparation is used in a commercial Mexican candy called mazapán de la Rosa.

=== Asia ===
In the Indian state of Goa, marzipan (maçapão) was introduced from Portugal. However, the Goan version uses cashew nuts instead of almonds. Goan marzipan is used to make Easter eggs. It is also used to make Christmas sweets in various shapes like fruits, flowers, stars, etc. Similarly, in the city of Mumbai, the Indians mould their cashewnut-based or almond-based marzipan into different shapes for Christmas and into marzipan eggs, chickens and bonnets for Easter.

In the Philippines marzipan was brought from Spain, mazapán de pili (Spanish for 'pili marzipan') is made from pili nuts.

== History ==
There are two proposed lines of origin for marzipan; they are not necessarily contradictory and may be complementary, as there have always been Mediterranean trade and cooking influences. Other sources establish the origin of marzipan in China, from where the recipe moved on to the Middle East and then to Europe through Al-Andalus.

=== Northeast Mediterranean line ===
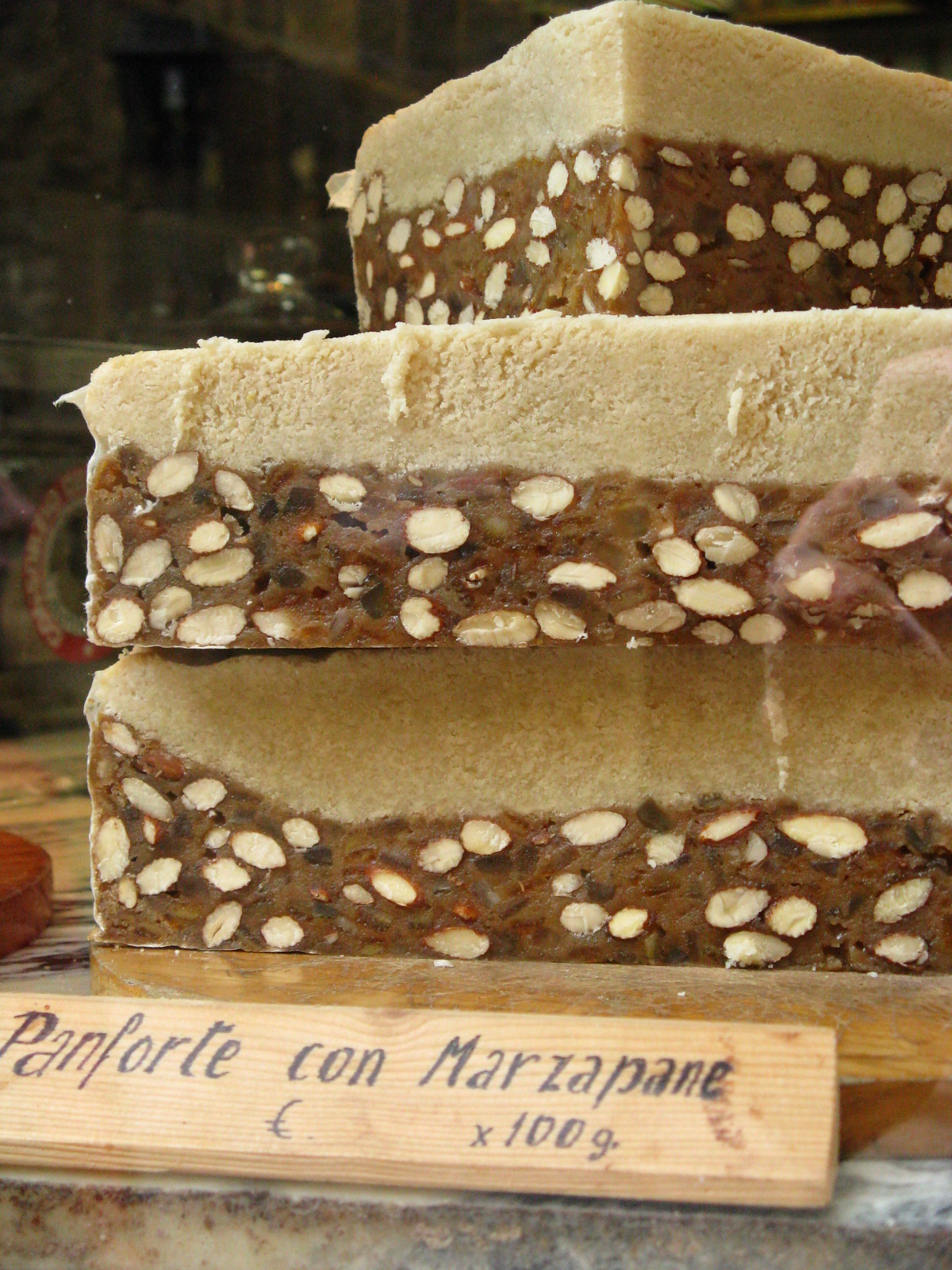
A variation of panforte with a topping of marzipan at a shop in San Gimignano

Although it is believed to have been introduced to Eastern Europe through the Turks (in badem ezmesi), and most notably produced in Edirne), there is some dispute between Hungary and Italy over its origin. Marzipan became a specialty of the Hanseatic League port towns. In particular, the cities of Lübeck and Tallinn have a proud tradition of marzipan manufacture. Examples include Lübeck Marzipan, which has Protected geographical indication (PGI) status. The city's manufacturers such as Niederegger still guarantee their marzipan to contain two-thirds almonds by weight, which results in a product of highest quality. Historically, the city of Königsberg in East Prussia was also renowned for its distinctive marzipan production. Königsberg marzipan remains a special type of marzipan in Germany that is golden brown on its surface and sometimes embedded with marmalade at its center. (Note: The main difference from the Lübeck style is that Königsberger Marzipan is browned on the surface and often has marmalade embedded in the centre. In Germany, the siblings of refugees from Königsberg still produce marzipan following traditional recipes. For example, the Gehlhaar confectioners in Wiesbaden (1912/45, seat Königsberg).)

=== Spain line ===
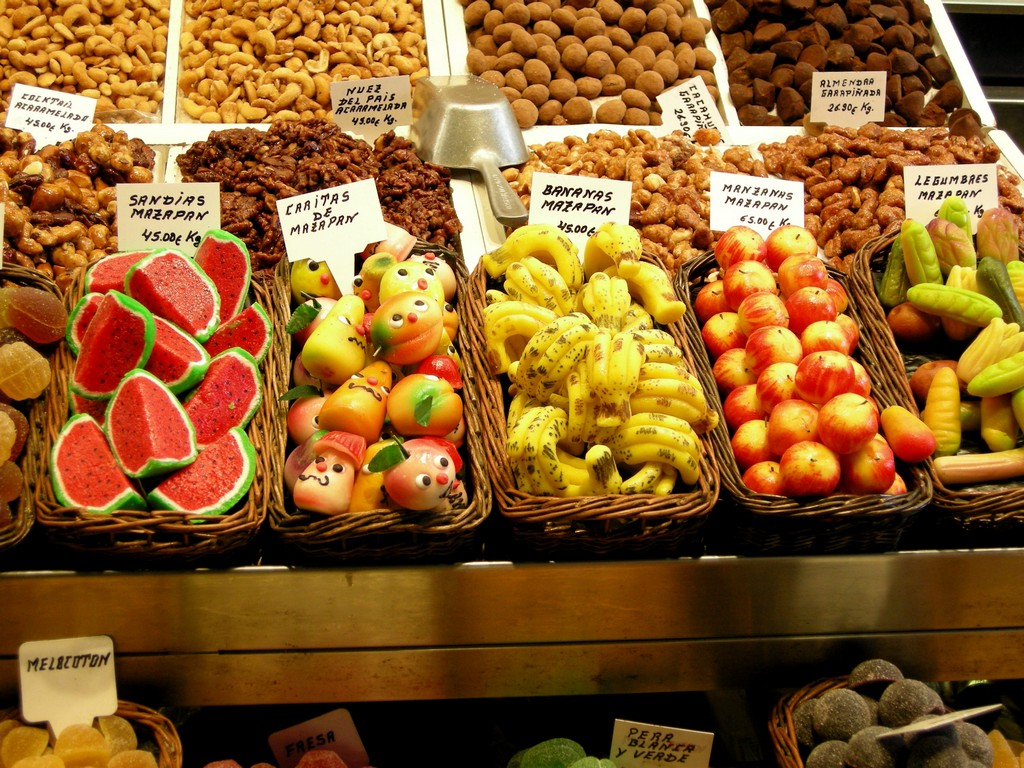
Fruit-shaped marzipan in baskets at a shop in Barcelona

Another possible geographic origin is the parts of Spain that were known as Al-Andalus. In Toledo (850–900, though more probably 1150 during the reign of Alfonso VII) this specialty was known as Postre Regio (instead of Mazapán). There are also mentions in the folktale collection, One Thousand and One Nights of an almond paste eaten during Ramadan and as an aphrodisiac. Mazapán is Toledo's most famous dessert, often created for Christmas, and has PGI status. For this, almonds have to be at least 50% of the total weight, following the directives of Mazapán de Toledo regulator council. Another idea to support this line is the important tradition of another Spanish almond-based Christmas confectionery, the turrón.

== Variations ==
Persipan is a similar, but less expensive product, in which the almonds are replaced by apricot or peach kernels. Many confectionery products sold as marzipan are made from less expensive materials, such as soy paste and almond essence. To control and detect the authenticity of marzipan, polymerase chain reaction methods can differentiate almonds from substitutes and adulterants at concentrations of less than one percent. German marzipan is made by grinding whole almonds with sugar and partially drying the paste, and French marzipan (called massepain) is made by combining ground almonds with sugar syrup. Some marzipan is flavoured with rosewater. Spanish marzipan is made without bitter almonds. In the United States, bitter almonds are not used in marzipan because the importation of bitter almonds into the country is prohibited by US law, owing to them containing a substance related to cyanide. Sugar-free marzipan can be made by replacing sugar with polyols, such as maltitol. Varieties made with other types of nuts are eaten in Latin America, and peanut-based marzipan is the most common variety in Mexico.

In the United States, marzipan is not officially defined, but it is generally made with a higher ratio of sugar to almonds than almond paste. One brand, for instance, has 28% almonds in its marzipan, and 45% almonds in its almond paste. However, in Sweden and Finland almond paste refers to a marzipan that contains 50% ground almonds, a much higher quality than regular marzipan. In Germany, Lübeck Marzipan is known for its quality. It contains 66% almonds. The original manually produced Mozartkugeln are made from green pistachio marzipan.

== Etymology ==
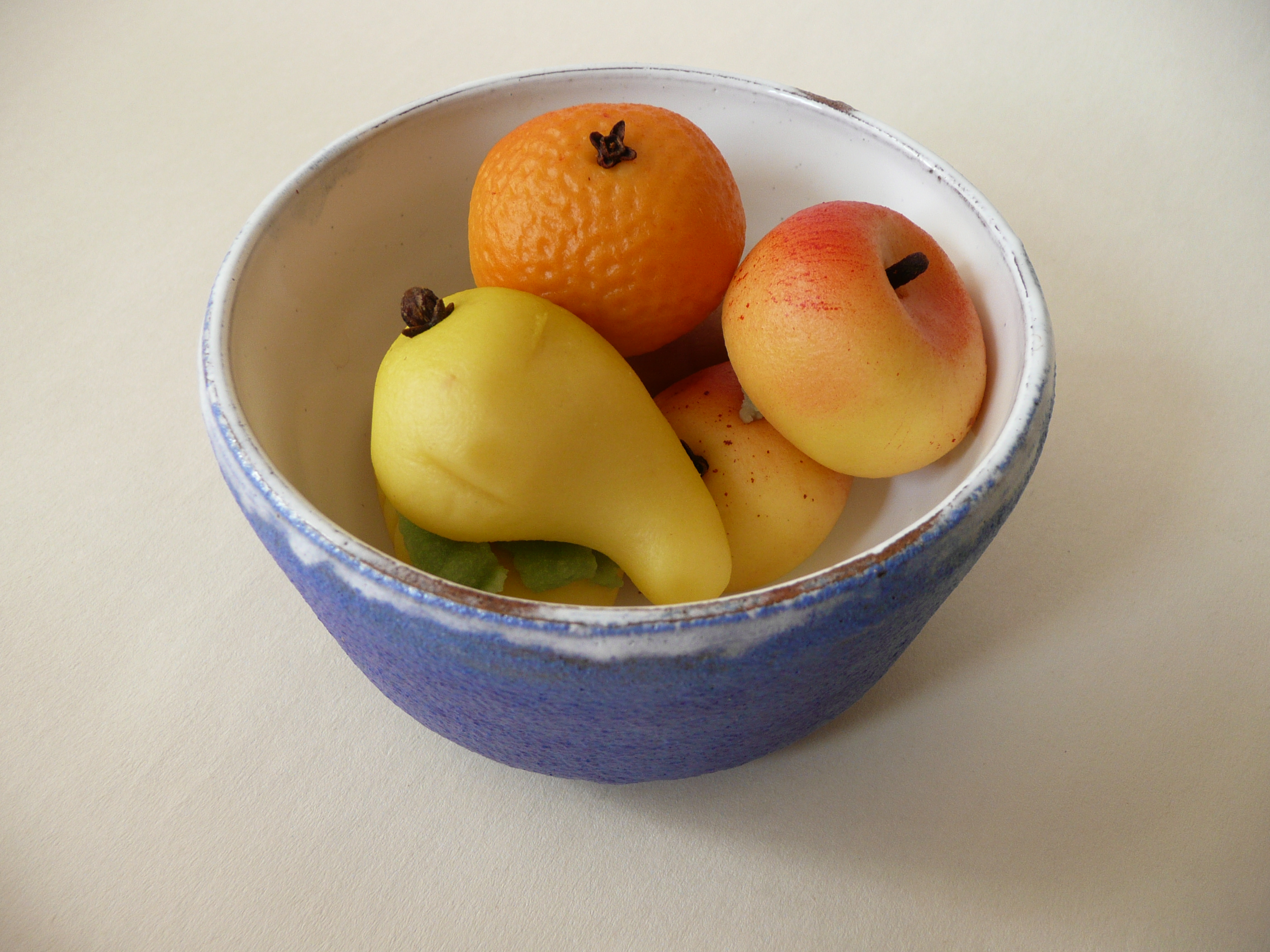
A bowl containing several fruit-shaped marzipan pieces

The German name has largely ousted the original English name marchpane with the same apparent derivation: 'March bread'. (The word marchpane occurs in Shakespeare's Romeo and Juliet, Act 1, Scene 5, Line 9.) Marzapane is documented earlier in Italian than in any other language, and the term pan meaning 'bread' originates in Romance languages. The origin could be from the Latin term martius panis, which means bread of March. In Johann Burchard’s Diarium curiae romanae (1483–1492) the Latin form appears as martiapanis.

The ultimate etymology is unclear; for example, the Italian word derives from the Latin words "Massa" (itself from Greek Μάζα "Maza") meaning pastry and "Pan" meaning bread, this can be particularly seen in the Provençal massapan, in Catalan massapà, the Portuguese maçapão (where 'ç' is an alternative letter for the phoneme usually expressed by 'ss') and old Spanish mazapán – the change from 'ss' to 'z' in Latin words was common in old Spanish and the 'r' appeared later. Among the other possible etymologies set forth in the Oxford English Dictionary, one theory proposes that the word "marzipan" may be a corruption of Martaban, a Burmese city famous for its jars.

The Real Academia Española suggests the Spanish mazapán is perhaps derived from the Hispanic Arabic, pičmáṭ, from the Greek παξαμάδιον, paxamádion ('little cake').

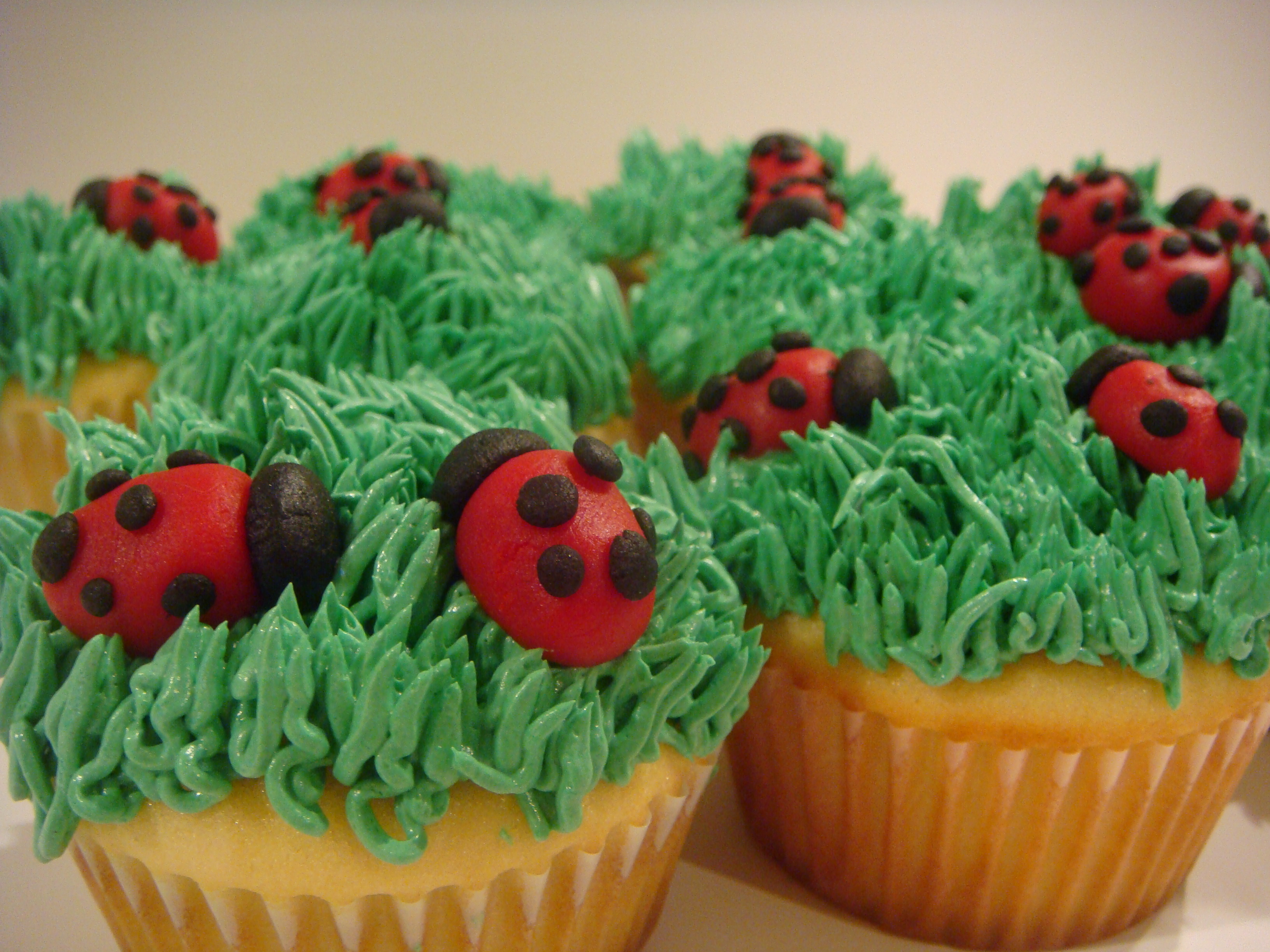
Cupcakes with green icing to appear as grass and marzipan shaped as ladybugs

Another possible source is from Arabic: موثابان mawthābān 'king who sits still'. The Arabic, Latinised as matapanus, was used to describe a Venetian coin depicting an enthroned Christ the King. These coins were stored in ornate boxes. From about the fifteenth century, when the coins were no longer in circulation, the boxes became decorative containers for storing and serving luxury sweetmeats. One such luxury that crept into the box in the sixteenth century is the now-famous almond-flavoured marzipan, named (at least proximately) after the box in which it was stored.

== Production ==
To produce marzipan, raw almonds are cleaned "by sieving, air elutriation, and other electronic or mechanical devices", then immersed in water with a temperature just below the boiling point for about five minutes, in a process known as blanching. This loosens the almonds' skin, which is removed by passing the almonds through rubber-covered rotating cylinders. They are then cooled, after which they are coarsely chopped and ground, with up to 35% sugar, into almond flour. In the traditional production of marzipan raw filler, a similar process is followed: Sweet almonds are scalded, peeled on rubber-covered rolls, coarsely chopped, and then ground with the addition of not more than 35% of sucrose.

The almond flour mixture is roasted and cooled, after which sucrose (table sugar) and possibly a binding agent such as starch syrup or sorbitol are added. It may then be moulded into any shape. Marzipan must be covered in an airtight container to prevent it from hardening and dehydrating. It should be protected from direct light to prevent rancidity of the almond oil, resulting from lipid oxidation.

== Science ==
=== Molecular composition ===
Benzaldehyde is a flavor compound found in almonds.

The aroma and flavor of marzipan can in part be attributed to benzaldehyde, which is formed from amygdalin.

=== Physical structure ===
Marzipan is a food emulsion that contains four phases: a solid phase of suspended particles including almonds and sugars, a suspended air pocket phase formed from incorporated air during mixing, a water phase, and a lipid phase from almond oil. The phases can separate when left alone for long periods of time. It is stabilized by the phospholipids and triglycerides found in the almond cells. The fatty acids found in almonds include saturated fats such as stearic acid and unsaturated fats such as linoleic acid. Emulsifiers can be added during production to increase shelf life.

Marzipan's softness is a balance between the solid and liquid components. It should have a moisture content of less than 10%.

== See also ==
- Aboukir almonds – marzipan-covered almonds originating in Abu Qir
- Cassata – a multi-layered Sicilian sponge cake covered in marzipan
- Frangipane – an almond-flavored pastry cream
- Hübner Haus – Site of a former famous marzipan factory and pastry shop in Hamburg, Germany
- List of almond dishes

== Works cited ==
- Barer-Stein, Thelma (1999). You Eat What You Are: People, Culture and Food Traditions. Firefly Books. ISBN 1-55209-365-4.
- Belitz, Hans-Dieter; Grosch, Werner; Schieberle, Peter (2009). Food Chemistry. Springer. ISBN 978-3-540-69933-0.
- Davidson, Jane L.; Davidson, Alan; Saberi, Helen; Jaine, Tom (2006). The Oxford companion to food. Oxford: Oxford University Press. ISBN 0-19-280681-5.
- Mendel, Janet (2008). Cooking from the Heart of Spain. Frances Lincoln Publishers. ISBN 978-0-7112-2873-3.
- Minifie, Bernard W. (1989). Chocolate, Cocoa, and Confectionery: Science and Technology. Berlin: Springer. ISBN 0-8342-1301-X.
- Patridge, E. (1958). "marchpane". Origins: A short etymological dictionary of the modern English. London: Routledge. p. 380.
