= Frutta martorana =

Italian marzipan sweet

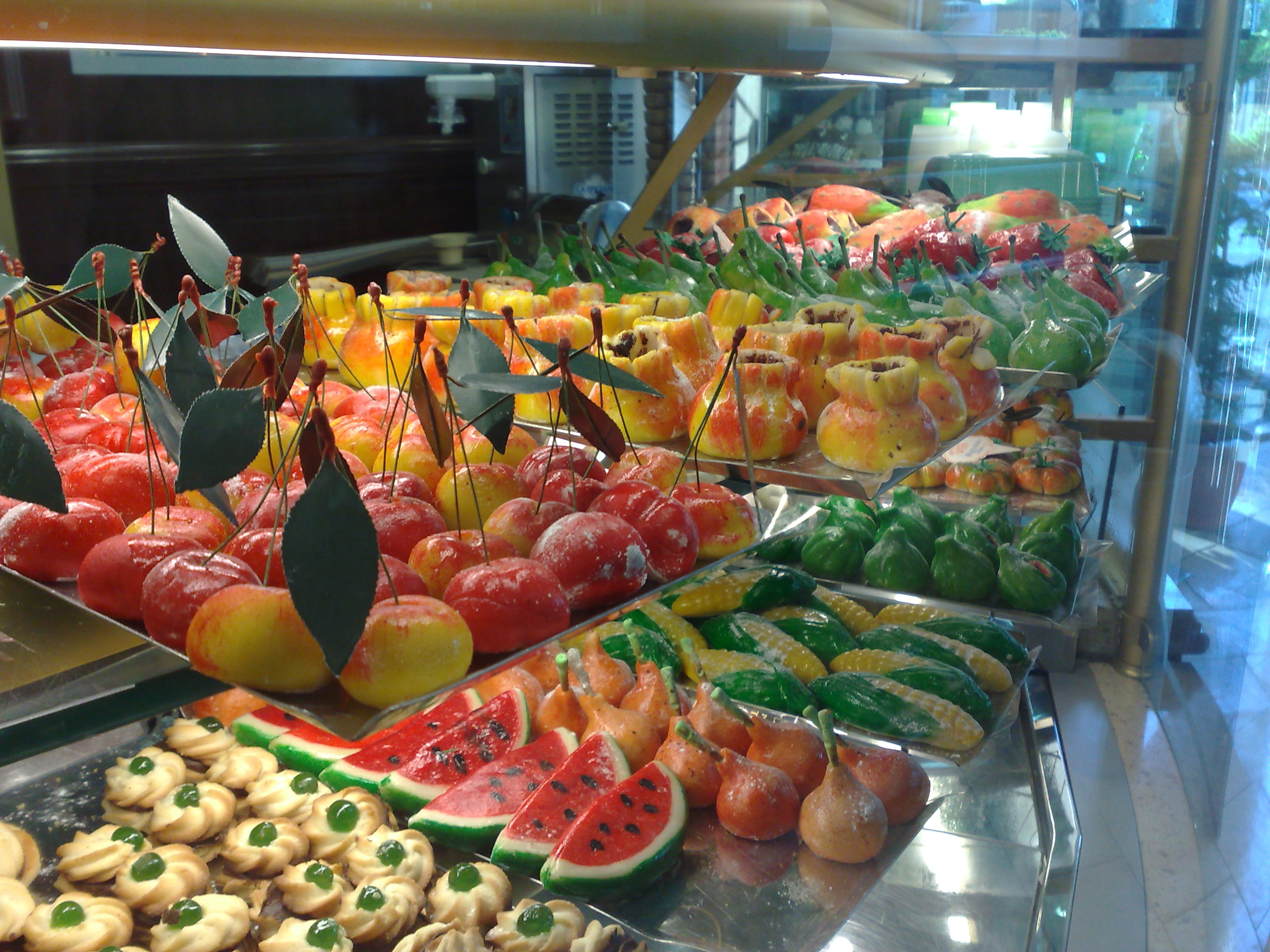
- Alternative names: Frutta di Martorana, frutta marturana
- Place of origin: Italy
- Region or state: Sicily (provinces of Palermo and Trapani)
- Main ingredients: Marzipan, vegetable dyes

Frutta martorana (also called frutta di Martorana or, in Sicilian, frutta marturana) is a Sicilian marzipan sweet in the form of fruits and vegetables from the provinces of Palermo and Trapani.

Realistically coloured with vegetable dyes, it is said to have originated at the Benedictine nunnery of Santa Maria dell'Ammiraglio, Palermo, known as La Martorana after its foundress, when nuns decorated empty fruit trees with marzipan fruit to impress an archbishop visiting at a season when the trees were not fruiting. It is traditionally put by children's bedsides on All Souls' Day.

== See also ==
- Sicilian cuisine
- List of Italian desserts and pastries
