= Mazapán de la Rosa =

Mexican peanut candy

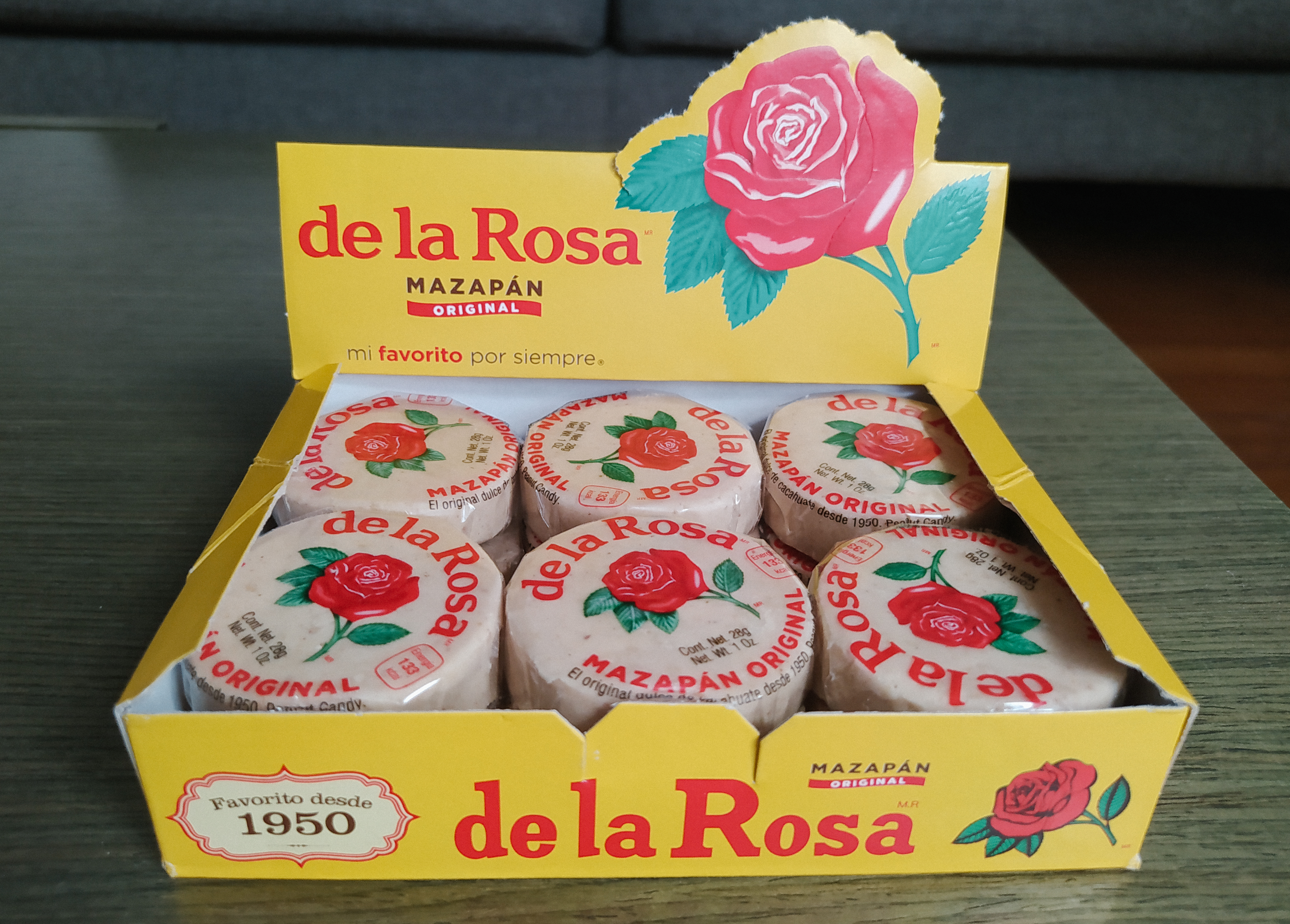
- Box of mazapán de la Rosa
- Type: Confectionery
- Place of origin: Guadalajara, Jalisco, Mexico
- Main ingredients: peanut, powdered sugar

Nutritional info
Nutritional value per 28g
- Energy: 130 kcal (540 kJ)
- Carbohydrates: 18g
- Sugars: 16g
- Dietary fiber: 1g
- Fat: 100g
- Saturated: 1g
- Trans: 0g
- Protein: 5g
Vitamins and minerals
Minerals	Quantity %DV^{†}
Sodium	0% 5 mg
- Other constituents: Quantity
- Cholesterol: 0mg
- ^{†}Percentages estimated using US recommendations for adults. Source: https://www.eatthismuch.com/calories/mazapan-2300804

Mazapán de la Rosa is a Mexican confection made with sugar, peanuts and artificial flavors, and is the main product of the Mexican food company Dulces de la Rosa, based in Tlajomulco, Jalisco, Mexico. It is one of the country's most popular snacks, with origins dating back to the 1950s. The recipe originated from marzipan, a traditional Spanish sweet originally made with almonds.

== History ==
Between 1948 and 1950, Jesús Michel González and Elvira Velasco Rolón opened a confectionery business in Guadalajara, Jalisco, to support their large family of thirteen children. During the first years, their shop, Conitas, sold various sweets, including galletas grageas (Mexican sprinkle cookies), paletas, and caramels. In 1950 they created the recipe for Mazapán de la Rosa, inspired by the original Spanish recipe for marzipan, except using peanuts instead of almonds since they were cheaper. It also does not contain eggs, unlike the original recipe.

Initially, the emblem of the Conitas mazapán was not a rose, but rather three strawberries. However, as their product grew in popularity, another company that also sold mazapán threatened to sue due to the Conitas emblem's similarity to their emblem, which had three cherries. Michel decided to replace the strawberries with a rose, since at that time Guadalajara was promoting itself as "the city of roses".

In 2018, to celebrate International Marzipan Day (12 January), Dulces de la Rosa made the largest mazapán in the world, breaking a Guinness World Record.

== Consumption ==
Mazapán de la Rosa is sold in small shops and various markets and supermarkets in Mexico and the United States, and is usually eaten as a snack. It's also used as an ingredient in other desserts, such as ice cream, agua fresca, natillas, and conchas.

== Variations ==
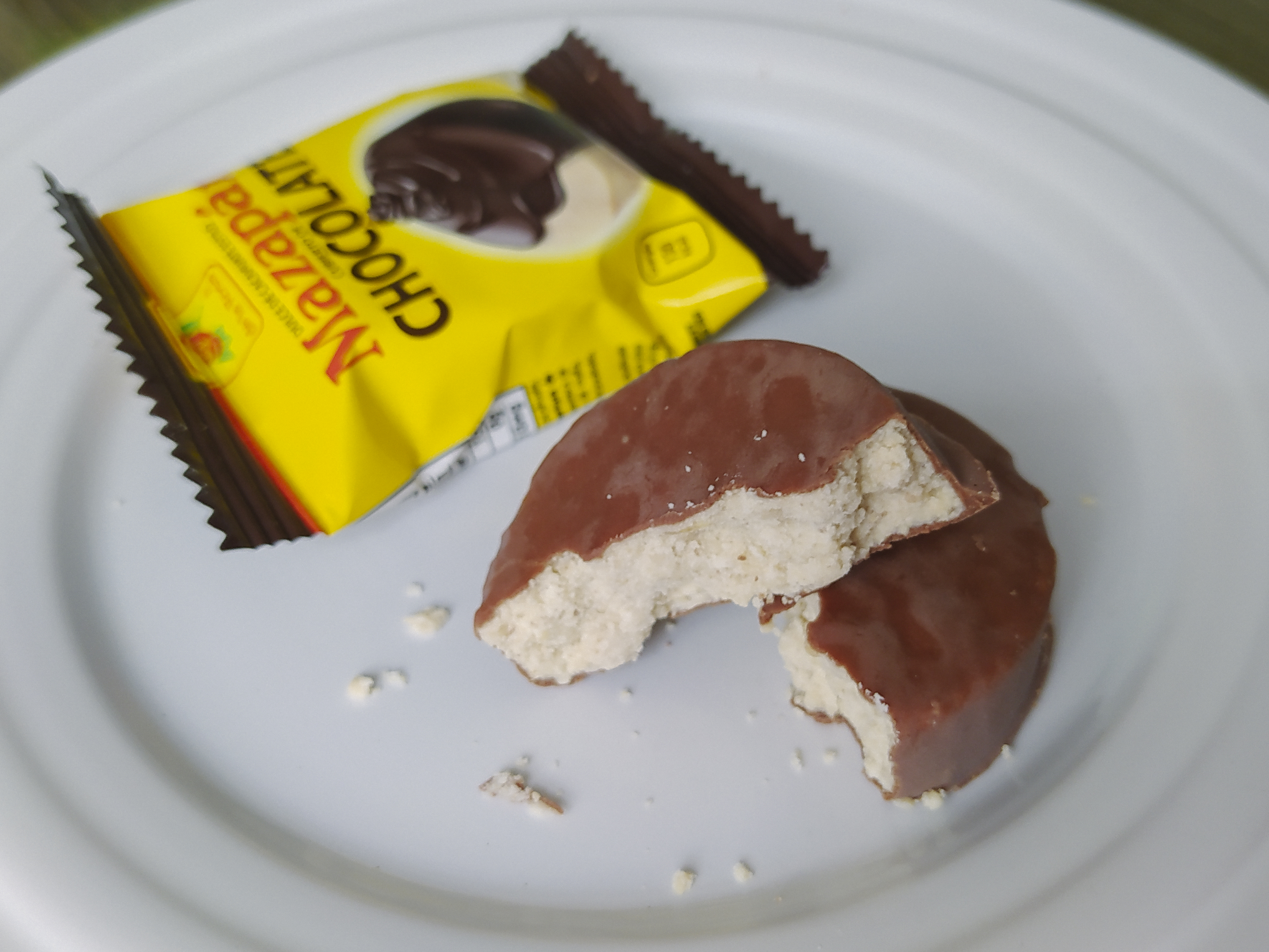
Chocolate-covered mazapán de la Rosa

In addition to the original, Dulces de la Rosa also offers chocolate-covered mazapán de la Rosa, as well as sugar-free options for both the original and chocolate-covered varieties using Splenda as a sweetener. They also sell a gigante version, with each piece weighing 50 grams as opposed to the standard 28 grams.

== Gallery ==
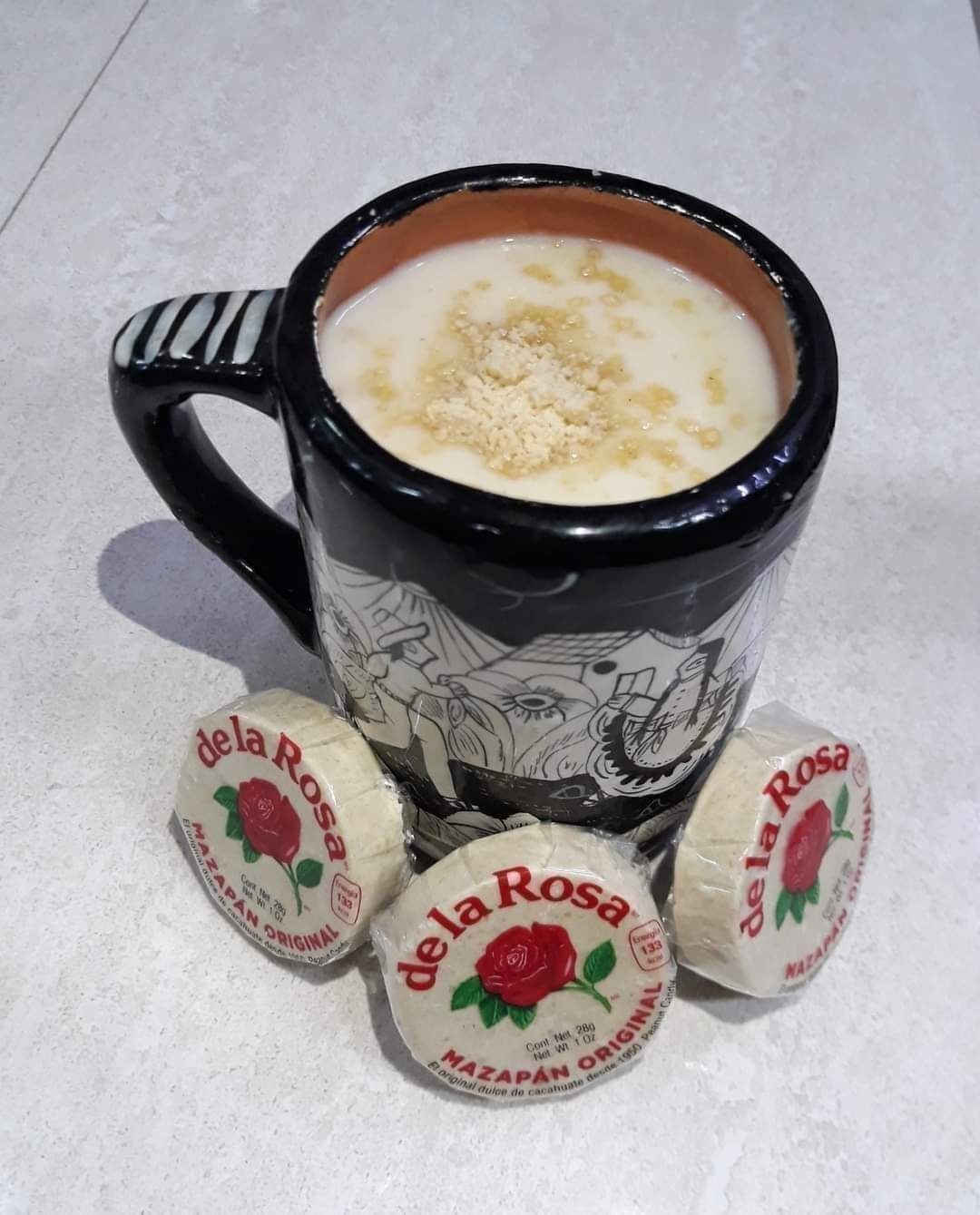
Agua fresca made from mazapán de la Rosa.
