= Lübeck Marzipan =

German marzipan brand

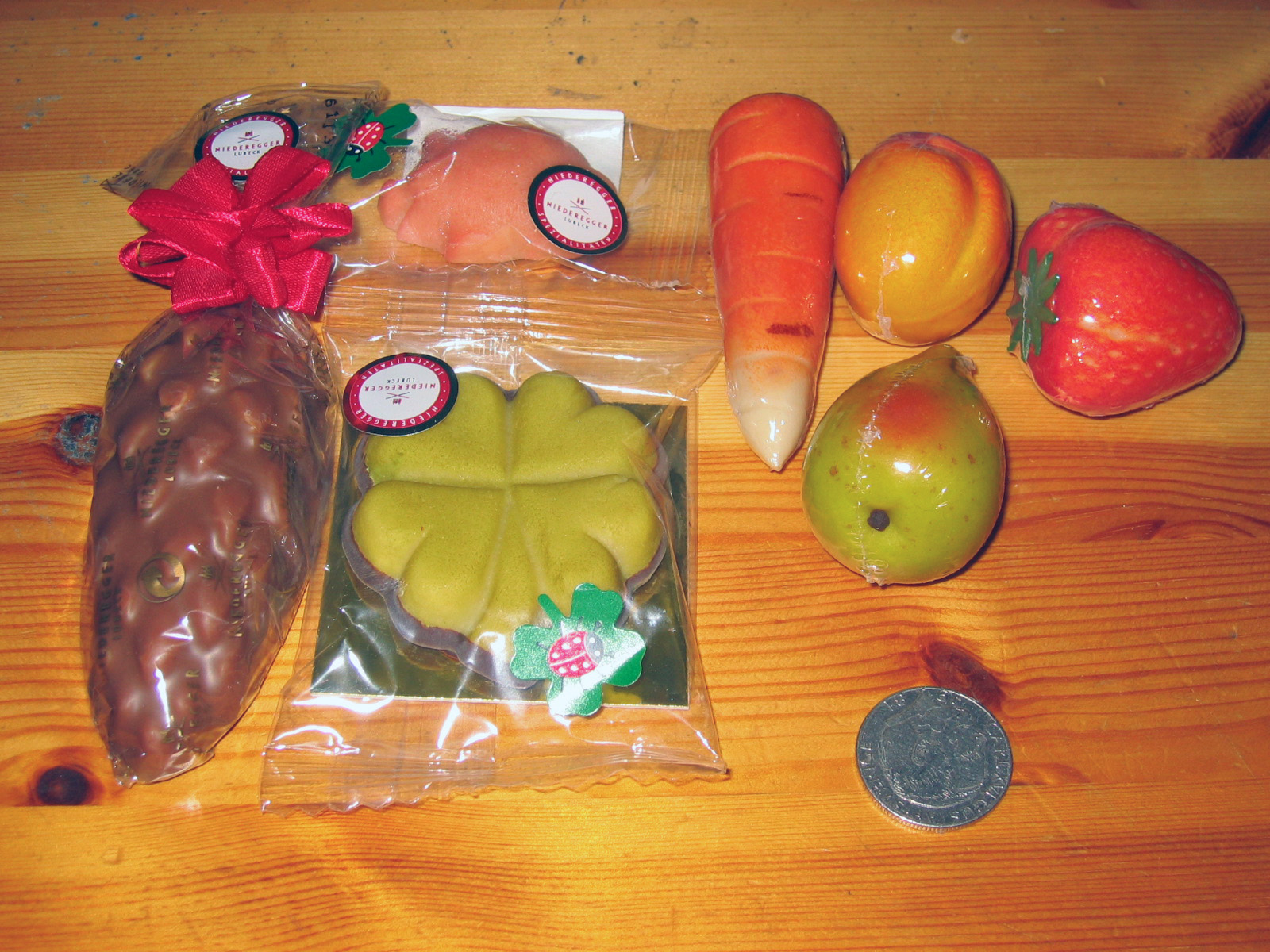
A selection of different marzipan products produced by Niederegger

Lübeck Marzipan (German: Lübecker Marzipan) refers to marzipan originating from the city of Lübeck in northern Germany and has been protected by an EU Council Directive as a “Protected Geographical Indication” (PGI) since 1996.

The quality requirements of Lübeck Marzipan are set higher than those of conventional marzipan and are regulated by the RAL German Institute for Quality Assurance and Classification. For a product to qualify as Lübeck Marzipan, a product must contain no more than 30% sugar, while the Lübeck Fine Marzipan must contain up to 10% sugar.

The marzipan manufacturers of Lübeck such as Niederegger, Carstens, Lubeca or Marzipan-Land, however, follow some principles of quality by voluntary commitments, not required by the directive. Niederegger, for example, uses 100% almond paste and no sugar.

== History ==
While marzipan has been produced in Central Europe since the Middle Ages, the product typically contained a large amount of sugar, with only a small amount of almond mixed in. This was largely due to there being only a limited supply of almonds, as they are not grown in the area and had to be imported.

Lübeck, as the capital of the Hanseatic League, was an important trading hub, which ensured a steady supply of ingredients. Consequently, in the 18th century, the marzipan produced in Lübeck started becoming well known for its high quality, due to its high almond content.

Today, Lübeck is host to several attractions that reference the city's association with marzipan. The most notable of these is the Niederegger Marzipan Museum, which includes amongst its exhibits: historical accounts of the production of marzipan, the original 1806 Niederegger recipe and various historical figures sculpted in marzipan.

== See also ==
- List of almond dishes
