= Niederegger =

German food company

Coordinates: 53.86653°N 10.685698°E

- Type: GmbH & Co. KG
- Industry: Confectionery
- Founded: 1806; 220 years ago
- Founder: Johann Georg Niederegger
- Headquarters: Lübeck, Germany
- Key people: Holger Strait
- Website: niederegger.de

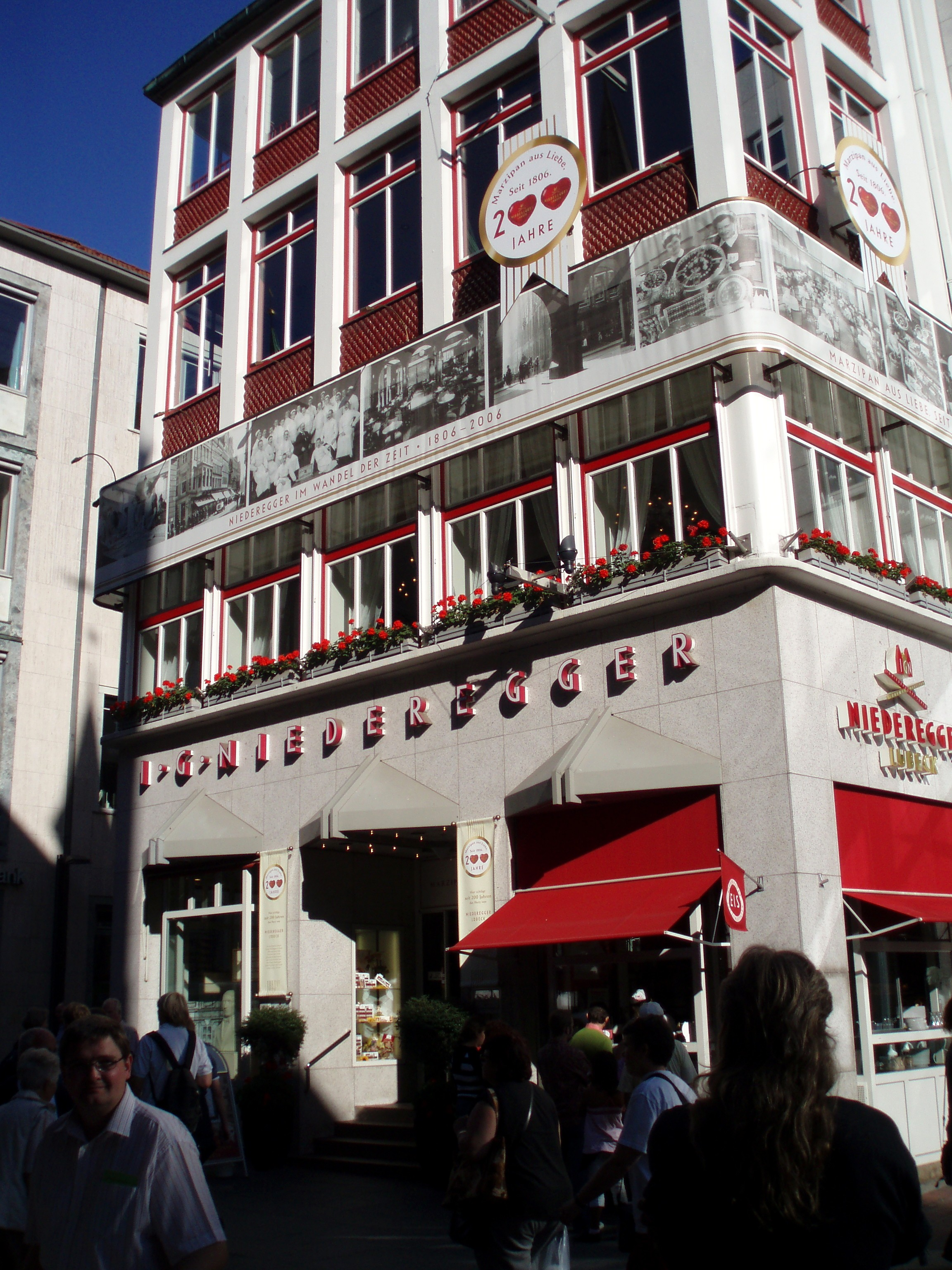
Café Niederegger in central Lübeck with 200th anniversary decoration

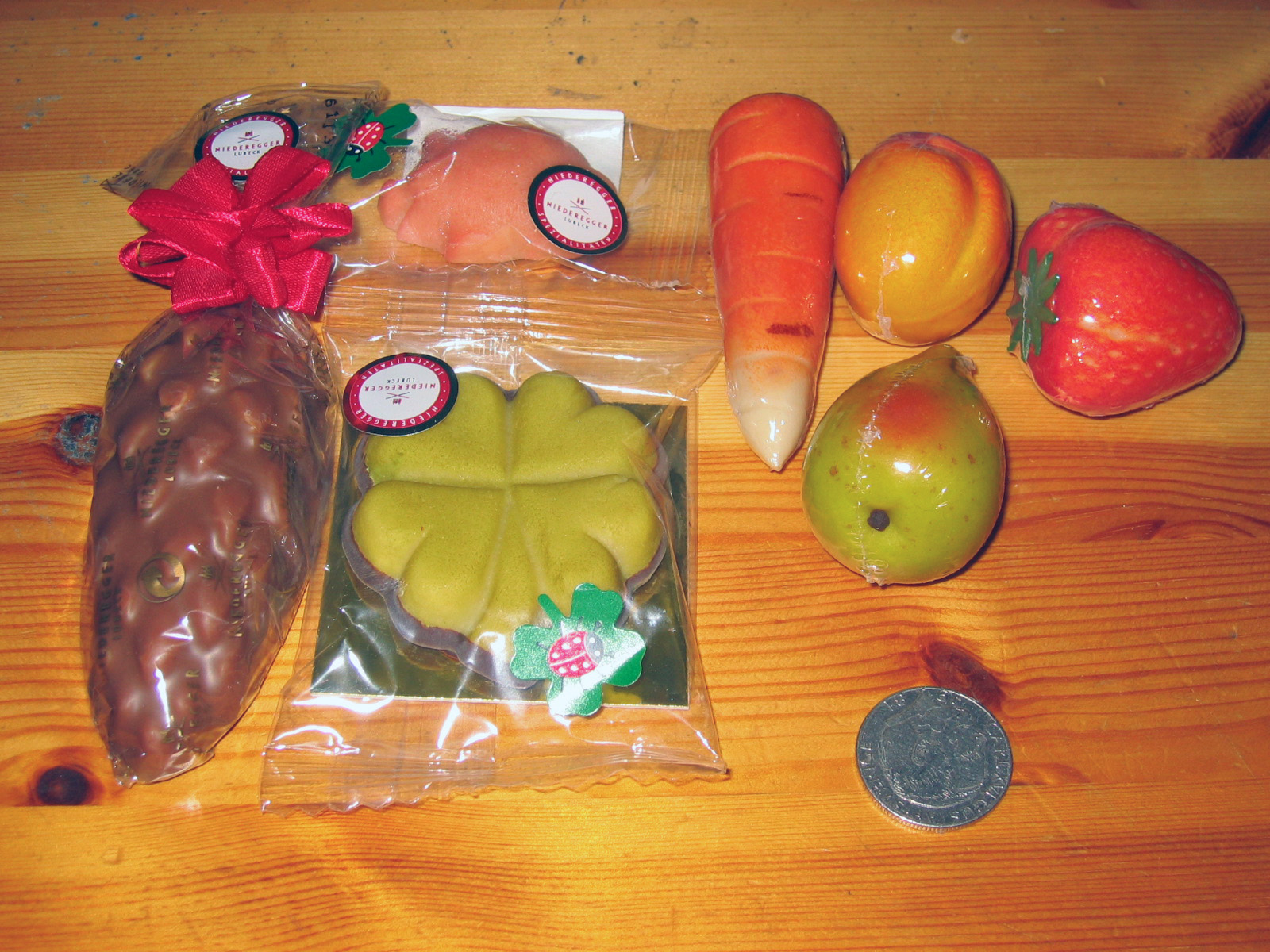
A selection of different marzipan products produced by Niederegger

J. G. Niederegger GmbH & Co. KG is a producer of marzipan and sweets which is based in Lübeck, Germany.

Niederegger was founded in Lübeck on 1 March 1806 by Johann Georg Niederegger (1777–1856). The company is a family-owned limited private partnership.

Niederegger marzipan made by "canditors" since the days of the Hanseatic League is classed as 100% marzipan. By the 19th century, marzipan, traditionally the choice of kings and queens, was becoming popular with the ordinary people of Lübeck. The tradition that Niederegger marzipan contains much less sugar than that produced by other marzipan makers began with Johann Georg, who was apprentice to Maret, another confectioner. Johann Georg left in 1806 to set up his own shop, and the products he produced were of such high quality that they were sought out by kings and emperors.

In the town center of Lübeck, opposite the Town Hall, the always-crowded Café Niederegger, known as the "harem confectionery", offers a café, a shop for Niederegger sweets, and a marzipan museum on its upper floors. It is possible to trace the sale of the almond product on the premises back to the 12th century.

Niederegger's many customers have included the writer, and son of Lübeck, Thomas Mann.
